= Pennsylvania Route 210 =

State highway in Pennsylvania, US

Pennsylvania Route 210

Route information
- Maintained by PennDOT
- Length: 29.859 mi (48.053 km)

Major junctions
- South end: PA 56 / PA 156 in South Bend Township
- US 422 in Elderton; PA 85 / PA 954 from Beyer to Plumville; PA 954 in North Mahoning Township
- North end: US 119 near Covode

Location
- Country: United States
- State: Pennsylvania
- Counties: Armstrong, Indiana

Highway system
- Pennsylvania State Route System; Interstate; US; State; Scenic; Legislative
← US 209	→ PA 212

Pennsylvania Route 210 (PA 210) is a 30-mile-long (48 km) state highway located in Armstrong and Indiana counties in Western Pennsylvania. The southern terminus is at PA 56/PA 156 in South Bend Township. The northern terminus is at U.S. Route 119 (US 119) near Covode.

== Route description ==
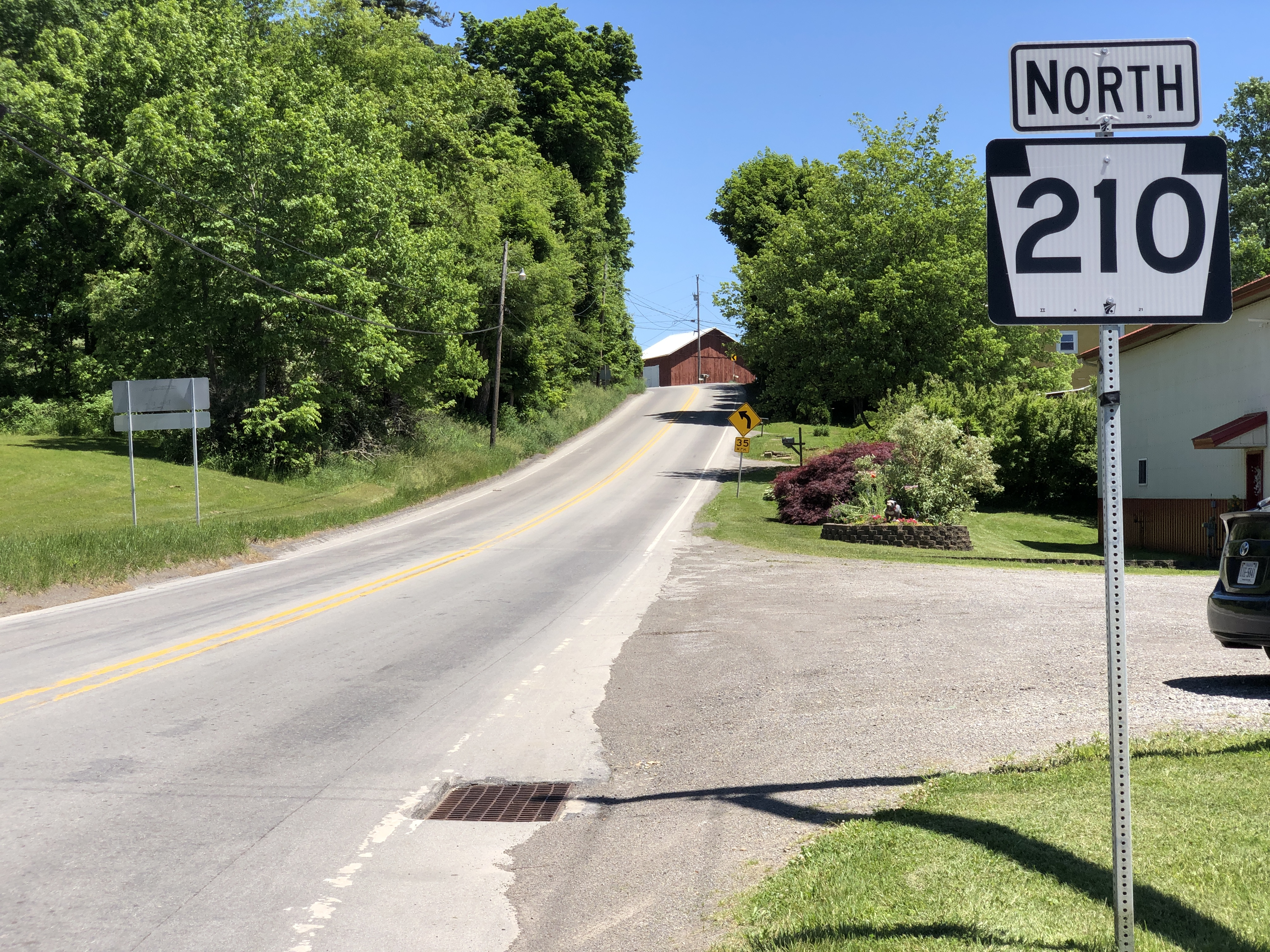
PA 210 northbound past PA 954 in Trade City

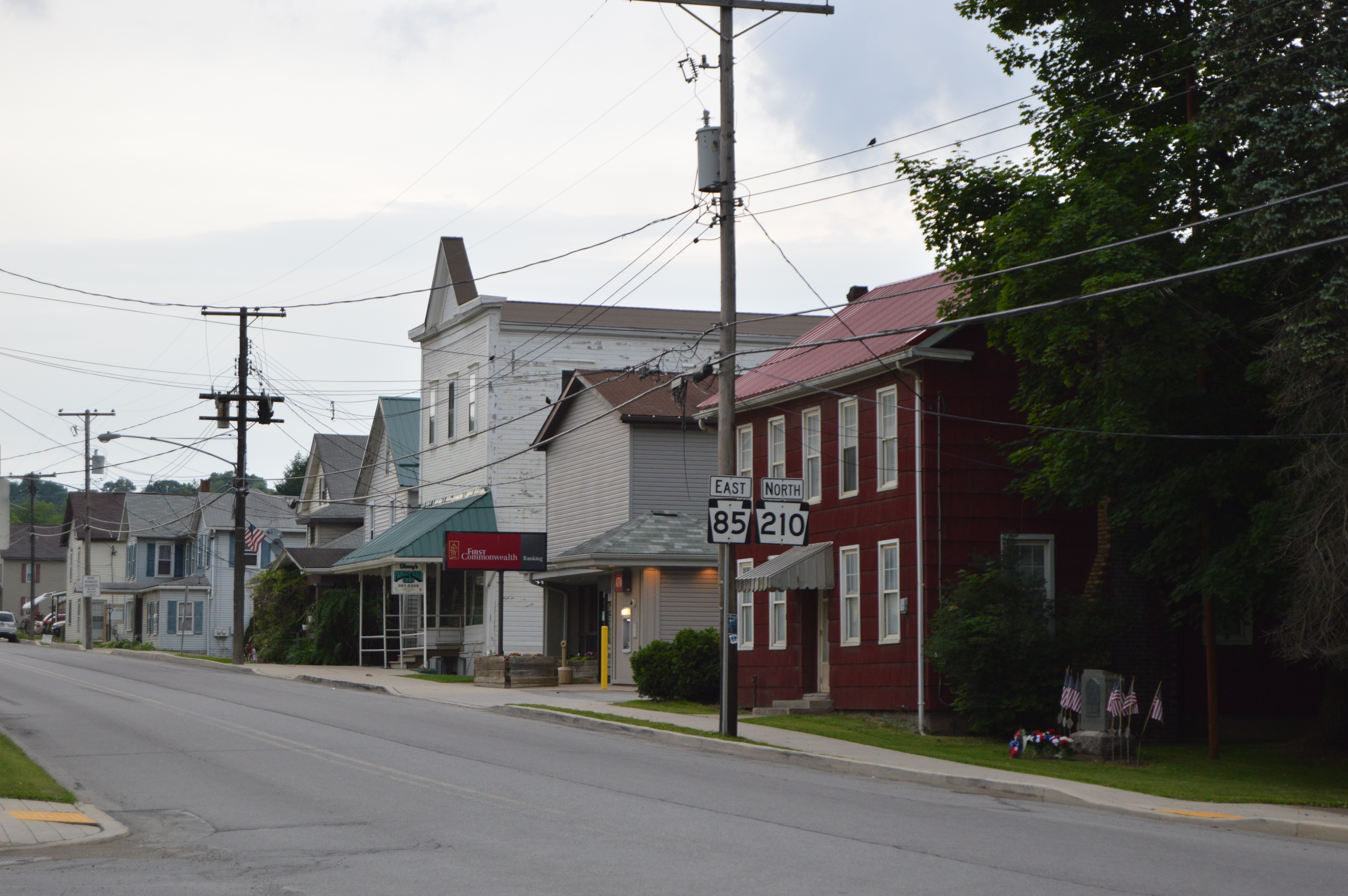
PA 85/PA 210 in Plumville

PA 210 begins at an intersection with PA 56/PA 156 in South Bend Township, Armstrong County, heading northwest on a two-lane undivided road. The route crosses Crooked Creek and continues into a mix of farmland and woodland with occasional homes, curving to the north. The road crosses into Plumcreek Township and passes through more rural areas, turning to the north-northeast as it heads west of the Keystone Generating Station. PA 210 comes to an intersection with US 422 southeast of the borough of Elderton and continues through more agricultural areas with some woods and residences, running a short distance to the northwest of Plum Creek. Farther northeast, the road crosses the North Branch Plum Creek and heads into more forested areas with a few fields and development, running near the southeastern shore of Keystone Lake. The route continues into Cowanshannock Township before heading into the borough of Atwood, turning east. PA 210 heads back into Cowanshannock Township and runs through more forests south of the lake. Past the lake, the road turns northeast through more farmland and woodland with some homes, passing through the residential community of Sagamore on Main Street before running through more rural areas.

PA 210 enters South Mahoning Township in Indiana County and becomes an unnamed road as it passes through more farms and woods, coming to an intersection with PA 85. At this point, the route turns east for a concurrency with PA 85, coming to a junction with PA 954. Here, PA 954 turns east to join PA 85/PA 210. The three routes run through the residential community of Beyer before passing through more rural areas prior to entering the borough of Plumville. Here, the road becomes Main Street and passes homes and businesses. PA 954 splits from PA 85/PA 210 by turning north Smicksburg Street and PA 85/PA 210 continue northeast through more of the town. The road turns to the southeast and heads back into South Mahoning Township, becoming unnamed again. PA 210 splits from PA 85 by heading northeast into a mix of farmland and woodland with occasional homes. The road runs through rural areas for several miles, passing through the northwestern portion of East Mahoning Township before heading into North Mahoning Township. The route turns north as it comes to Trade City and intersects the northern terminus of PA 954 and turns to the east. PA 210 winds northeast through more farmland with some woods and residences, curving north again. The route makes another turn to the east and passes through more farms and woods before ending at US 119.

== Major intersections ==
County	Location	mi	km	Destinations	Notes
Armstrong	South Bend Township	0.000	0.000	PA 56 / PA 156 – Shelocta, Apollo	Southern terminus
Armstrong	Plumcreek Township	3.782	6.087	US 422 (Benjamin Franklin Highway) – Indiana, Elderton, Kittanning	
Indiana	South Mahoning Township	14.292	23.001	PA 85 west	South end of PA 85 overlap
Indiana	South Mahoning Township	14.485	23.311	PA 954 south (Five Points Road)	South end of PA 954 overlap
Indiana	Plumville	15.821	25.461	PA 954 north (Smicksburg Street) / Indiana Street	North end of PA 954 overlap
Indiana	South Mahoning Township	16.692	26.863	PA 85 east – Home	North end of PA 85 overlap
Indiana	North Mahoning Township	25.054	40.321	PA 954 south / Miller Road – Smicksburg	Northern terminus of PA 954
Indiana	North Mahoning Township	29.859	48.053	US 119 – Punxsutawney, Indiana	Northern terminus
1.000 mi = 1.609 km; 1.000 km = 0.621 mi: Concurrency terminus
