= Pennsylvania Route 954 =

State highway in Indiana County, Pennsylvania, US

Pennsylvania Route 954

Route information
- Maintained by PennDOT
- Length: 35.321 mi (56.844 km)

Major junctions
- South end: PA 56 in Center Township
- North end: PA 210 in North Mahoning Township

Location
- Country: United States
- State: Pennsylvania
- Counties: Indiana

Highway system
- Pennsylvania State Route System; Interstate; US; State; Scenic; Legislative
← PA 953	→ PA 955

Pennsylvania Route 954 (PA 954) is a 35-mile-long (56 km) state highway located in Indiana County, Pennsylvania. The southern terminus is at PA 56 in Center Township. The northern terminus is at PA 210 in North Mahoning Township. PA 954 is a two-lane undivided road that serves Indiana, Creekside, Plumville, and Smicksburg. The route intersects U.S. Route 422 (US 422) and PA 286 in Indiana, PA 110 in Creekside, and PA 85/PA 210 in Plumville. PA 954 was designated in 1928 between Smicksburg and PA 210 in Trade City. The route was extended south to Denton by 1930 and US 422 and PA 80 (now PA 286) in Indiana during the 1930s. PA 954 was lengthened to its current terminus in 1971.

== Route description ==
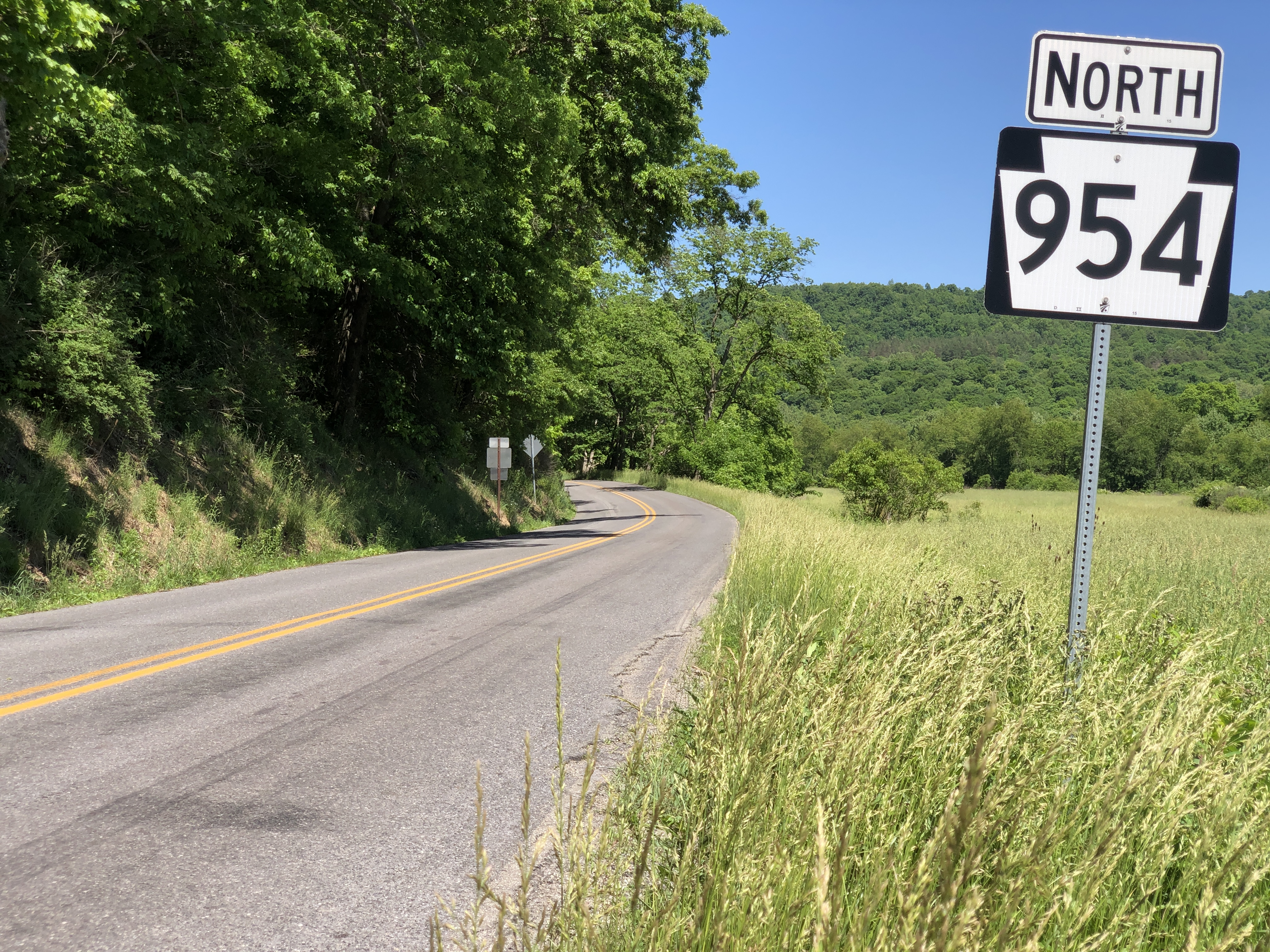
PA 954 northbound in Washington Township

PA 954 begins at an intersection with PA 56 in Center Township, heading north on a two-lane undivided road. The route heads through forested areas, turning northwest and becoming the border between Center Township to the west and Brush Valley Township to the east. The road crosses the Yellow Creek into White Township and becomes South 6th Street Extended, passing near residential areas. PA 954 becomes South 6th Street and runs through agricultural areas before reaching a diamond interchange with the US 422 freeway. Following this interchange, the route runs through a mix of farmland and woodland with some homes, crossing the Two Lick Creek and passing under a freeway carrying US 119 and PA 286 Truck. The road passes through more rural areas before entering residential areas, where it becomes the border between the borough of Indiana to the west and White Township to the east. PA 954 fully enters Indiana and runs past more homes, heading into the downtown area. Here, the route turns west to form a concurrency with PA 286 on Philadelphia Street, a three-lane road with a center left-turn lane, passing downtown businesses. PA 954 splits from PA 286 by heading north on two-lane undivided North 9th Street, while PA 286 turns south onto South 9th Street. The route heads through residential areas, crossing back into White Township.

PA 954 turns northwest onto Fulton Run Road and winds through forested areas, crossing a Buffalo and Pittsburgh Railroad line. The road continues through more wooded areas with some farm fields and homes, passing through the community of Fulton Run. The route turns to the north and crosses Crooked Creek and Norfolk Southern's Shelocta Running Track railroad line. PA 954 enters Washington Township and turns northeast onto Shelcota Street, passing through more rural areas and running a short distance northwest of the railroad line and the creek. The road heads into the borough of Creekside and intersects the western terminus of PA 110, becoming Chambersville Road at this point. The route crosses back into Washington Township and runs through a mix of farms and woods with some homes, splitting from Chambersville Road by turning north onto an unnamed road. PA 954 runs north-northwest through forests with some farm fields and residences, entering open agricultural areas as it turns west, reaching Willet. Here, the route becomes Five Points Road and comes to Five Points, turning north. The road runs through areas of farmland and woodland, crossing into South Mahoning Township.

In this area, PA 954 comes to a junction with PA 85/PA 210, turning east to form a concurrency with the two routes on an unnamed road. The three routes run through the residential community of Beyer before passing through more rural areas prior to entering the borough of Plumville. Here, the road becomes Main Street and passes homes and businesses. PA 954 splits from PA 85/PA 210 by turning north Smicksburg Street. The route heads back into South Mahoning Township and passes through a mix of agriculture and woods, becoming an unnamed road. At this point, PA 954 enters a section of northern Indiana County that is home to an Amish community. The road heads into open farmland and runs through Denton before crossing into West Mahoning Township. PA 954 runs through woodland before crossing into the borough of Smicksburg and becoming Kittanning Street. The route heads northeast through residential areas of the town, heading back into West Mahoning Township and turning southeast and crossing the Little Mahoning Creek in wooded areas. The road becomes unnamed and continues through farmland and woodland, curving to the east. PA 954 heads northeast and crosses into North Mahoning Township, passing through more rural areas with some homes as it heads east to its terminus at PA 210 in Trade City.

== History ==
When Pennsylvania first legislated routes in 1911, what is now PA 954 was not given a route number. PA 954 was designated in 1928 along an unpaved road between Smicksburg and PA 210 in Trade City. By 1930, the route was extended south from Smicksburg to Denton along a paved road, with an unnumbered paved road continuing south to PA 85 in Barnards. In the 1930s, PA 954 was lengthened to continue south to US 422 and PA 80 (now PA 286) at the intersection of 9th and Philadelphia streets in Indiana. At this time, the entire length of the route was paved. On August 30, 1971, PA 954 was extended south to its current terminus at PA 56 concurrent with the rerouting of US 422 onto a bypass of Indiana.

== Major intersections ==
The entire route is in Indiana County.

Location	mi	km	Destinations	Notes
Center Township	0.000	0.000	PA 56 – Armagh, Johnstown, Homer City	Southern terminus
White Township	3.336– 3.349	5.369– 5.390	US 422 (Benjamin Franklin Highway) – Kittanning, Ebensburg	Interchange
Indiana	6.325	10.179	PA 286 east (Philadelphia Street) to US 119	South end of PA 286 overlap
Indiana	6.591	10.607	PA 286 west (South 9th Street)	North end of PA 286 overlap
Creekside	13.250	21.324	PA 110 east (Indiana Road) – Ernest, Indiana	Western terminus of PA 110
South Mahoning Township	22.493	36.199	PA 85 west / PA 210 south – Rural Valley	South end of PA 85/PA 210 overlap
Plumville	23.829	38.349	PA 85 east / PA 210 north (Main Street) – Home	North end of PA 85/PA 210 overlap
North Mahoning Township	35.321	56.844	PA 210 – Plumville	Northern terminus
1.000 mi = 1.609 km; 1.000 km = 0.621 mi: Concurrency terminus
