= Pennsylvania Route 85 =

State highway in Pennsylvania, US

Pennsylvania Route 85

Route information
- Maintained by PennDOT
- Length: 24.563 mi (39.530 km)

Major junctions
- West end: PA 28 / PA 66 near Kittanning
- East end: US 119 in Home

Location
- Country: United States
- State: Pennsylvania
- Counties: Armstrong, Indiana

Highway system
- Pennsylvania State Route System; Interstate; US; State; Scenic; Legislative
← PA 84	→ I-86

Pennsylvania Route 85 (PA 85) is a 24-mile-long (39 km) east–west state highway located in western Pennsylvania. The western terminus of the route is at Pennsylvania Route 28 and Pennsylvania Route 66 east of Kittanning. The eastern terminus is at U.S. Route 119 in Home.

== Route description ==
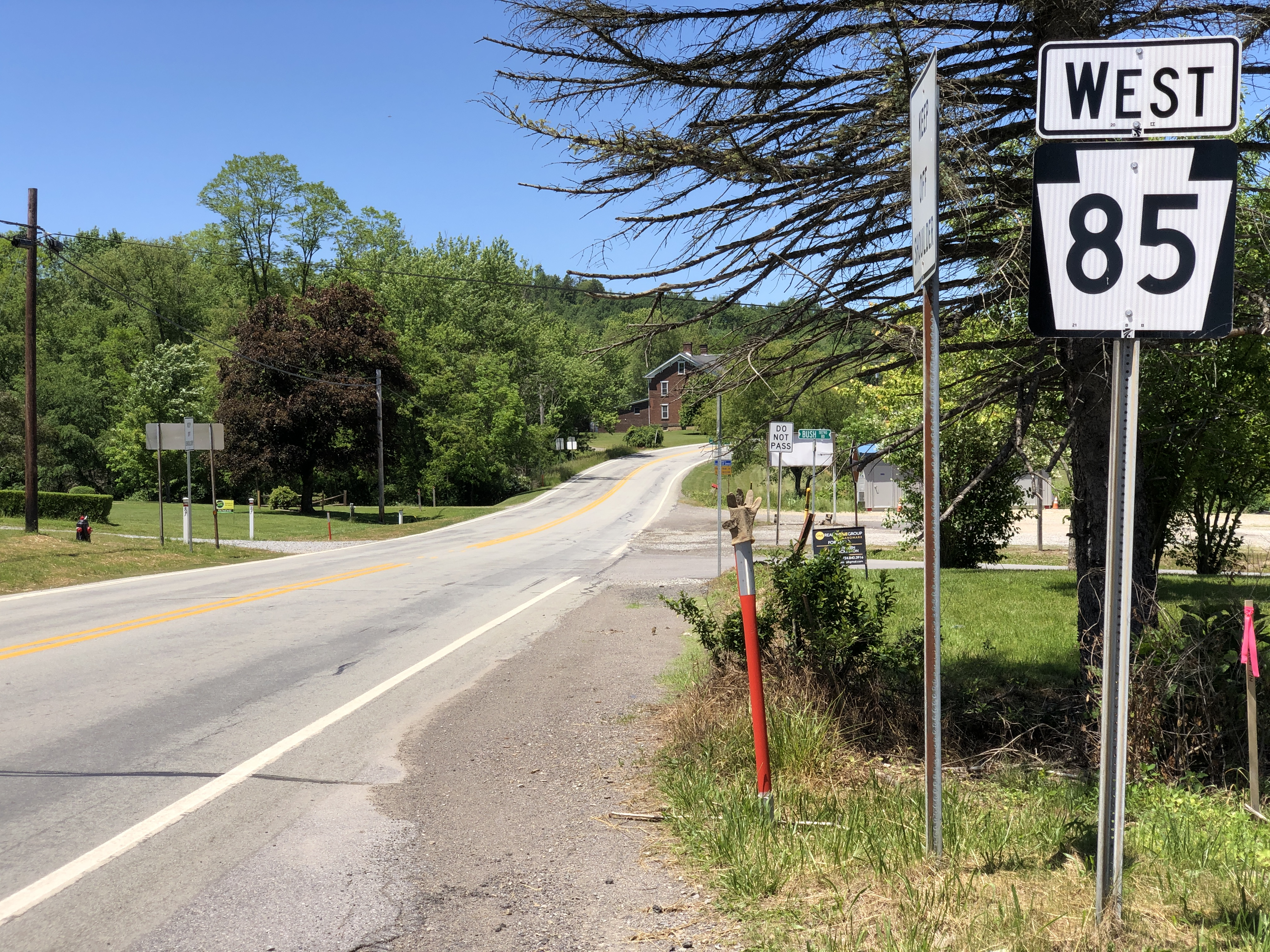
PA 85 westbound past US 119 in Home

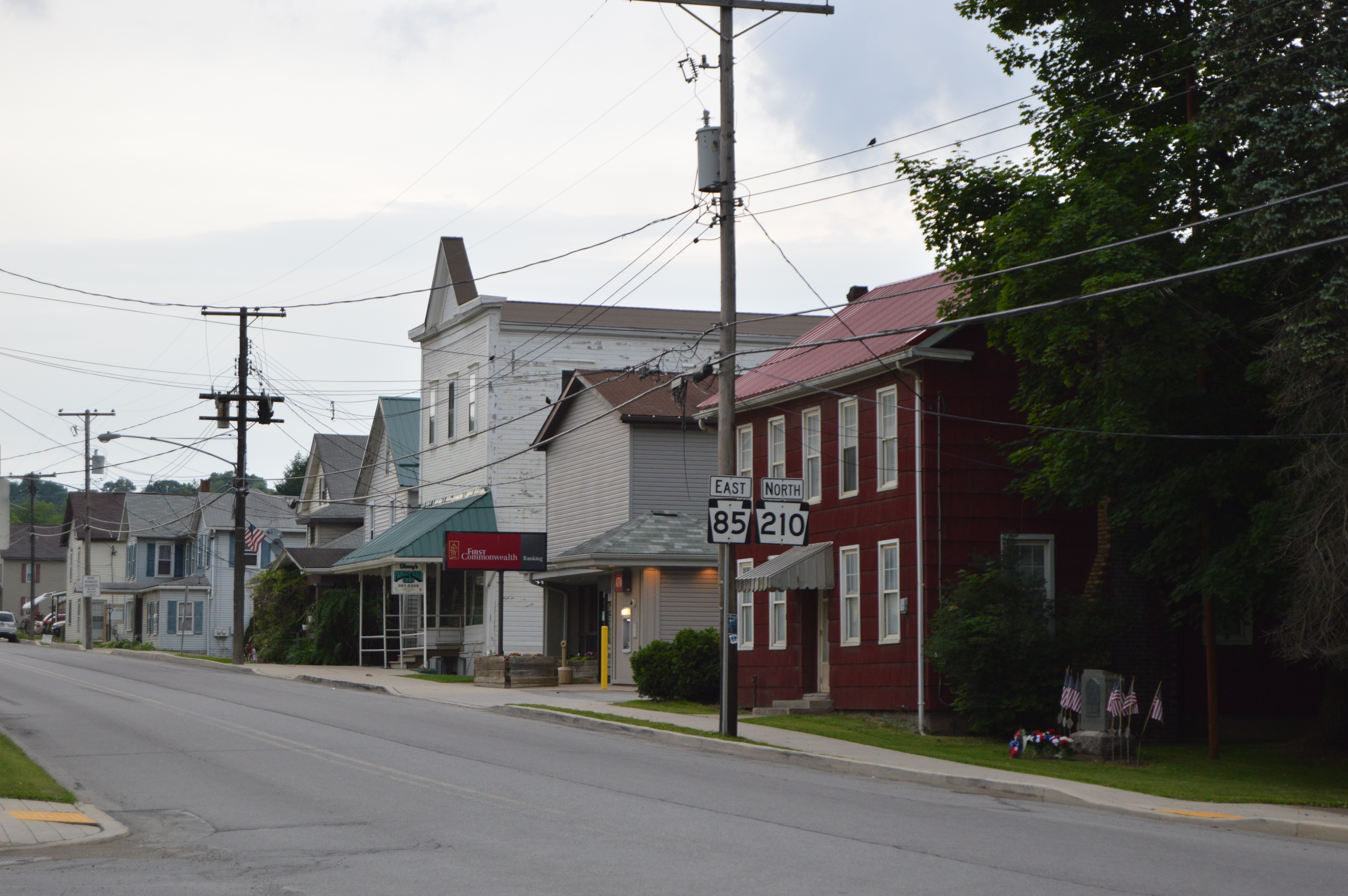
PA 85/PA 210 in Plumville

PA 85 begins at an intersection with PA 28/PA 66 in Rayburn Township, Armstrong County, heading east on a two-lane undivided road. The route passes through agricultural areas with some homes, running through the community of Green Acres. The road crosses the Cowanshannock Creek and heads through the community of Sunnyside, continuing northeast through woods and farms with some homes to the north of the creek and crossing into Valley Township. PA 85 curves southeast and winds east through wooded areas with occasional residences, passing through Greendale. The route heads through a mix of agriculture and woodland with some homes, continuing into Cowanshannock Township. The road runs through rural residential areas, passing through Rose Valley and Yatesboro. PA 85 crosses into the borough of Rural Valley and passes between housing areas to the north and woods to the south. The route crosses back into Cowanshannock Township and continues through a mix of farmland and woodland, passing to the south of the residential communities of Meredith and Nu Mine. The road intersects PA 839 and runs northeast and east through more rural areas. The route runs through farmland and turns southeast at Hoosicks Mill.

PA 85 enters South Mahoning Township in Indiana County and runs southeast through more farms and woods with a few homes, coming to an intersection with PA 210. At this point, the route turns east for a concurrency with PA 85, coming to a junction with PA 954. Here, PA 954 turns east to join PA 85/PA 210. The three routes run through the residential community of Beyer before passing through more rural areas prior to entering the borough of Plumville. Here, the road becomes Main Street and passes homes and businesses. PA 954 splits from PA 85/PA 210 by turning north Smicksburg Street and PA 85/PA 210 continue northeast through more of the town. The road turns to the southeast and heads back into South Mahoning Township, becoming unnamed again. PA 210 splits from PA 85 by heading northeast, and PA 85 continues southeast through more farmland and woodland with a few residences, curving south. The road heads southeast into Washington Township, turning more to the east-southeast. The route continues into Rayne Township and runs through more wooded areas with some fields and homes. PA 85 comes to its eastern terminus at an intersection with US 119 in Home.

== Major intersections ==
County	Location	mi	km	Destinations	Notes
Armstrong	Rayburn Township	0.0	0.0	PA 28 / PA 66 – Kittanning, New Bethlehem	Western terminus
Armstrong	Cowanshannock Township	12.7	20.4	PA 839 north (Dayton Road) – Dayton	Southern terminus of PA 839
Indiana	South Mahoning Township	16.6	26.7	PA 210 south (Sagamore Road) – Sagamore, Elderton	West end of PA 210 concurrency
Indiana	South Mahoning Township	16.8	27.0	PA 954 south (Beyer Road)	West end of PA 954 concurrency
Indiana	Plumville	18.1	29.1	PA 954 north (Smicksburg Road) – Smicksburg	East end of PA 954 concurrency
Indiana	South Mahoning Township	19.0	30.6	PA 210 north – Trade City	East end of PA 210 concurrency
Indiana	Rayne Township	24.5	39.4	US 119 – Punxsutawney, Indiana	Eastern terminus
1.000 mi = 1.609 km; 1.000 km = 0.621 mi: Concurrency terminus
