= Pennsylvania Route 156 =

State highway in Pennsylvania, US

Pennsylvania Route 156

Route information
- Maintained by PennDOT
- Length: 16.386 mi (26.371 km)

Major junctions
- South end: PA 981 near Avonmore
- PA 56 from Kiskiminetas Township to terminus PA 210 near Shelocta
- North end: US 422 / PA 56 in Shelocta

Location
- Country: United States
- State: Pennsylvania
- Counties: Westmoreland, Armstrong, Indiana

Highway system
- Pennsylvania State Route System; Interstate; US; State; Scenic; Legislative
← PA 155	→ PA 157

Pennsylvania Route 156 (PA 156) is a 16.4-mile-long (26.4 km) state highway located in Westmoreland, Armstrong and Indiana counties in Pennsylvania. The southern terminus is at PA 981 in Avonmore. The northern terminus is at U.S. Route 422 (US 422)/PA 56 in Shelocta.

== Route description ==
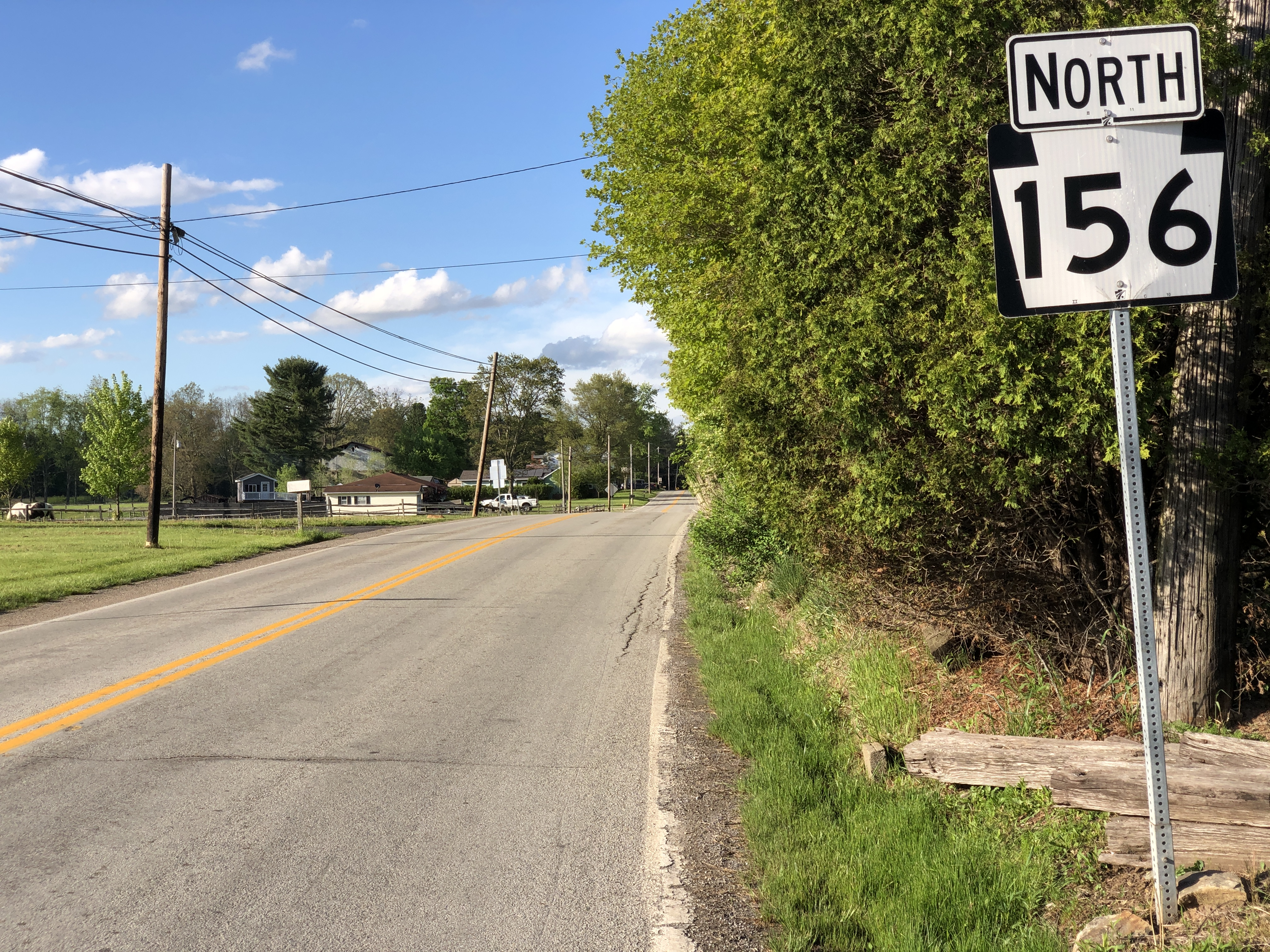
PA 156 northbound past PA 981 in Bell Township

PA 156 begins at an intersection with PA 981 in Bell Township, Westmoreland County, heading north-northeast on a two-lane undivided road. The route becomes the border between the borough of Avonmore to the west and Bell Township to the east as it heads through a mix of farms and woods with some homes. PA 156 fully enters Avonmore and heads into residential areas with a few businesses, merging north onto 2nd Street before turning east onto Westmoreland Avenue. The route turns north onto 6th Street and passes between industrial areas to the west and woods to the east.

PA 156 crosses the Kiskiminetas River into Kiskiminetas Township in Armstrong County and becomes an unnamed road, heading into wooded areas and turning west. The road turns north to pass over Norfolk Southern's Conemaugh Line before curving northeast through more forests. The route heads to the north and runs through more woodland with some fields and homes, passing through Maysville. PA 156 continues north through more rural areas, coming to an intersection with PA 56. At this point, the route turns northeast to form a concurrency with PA 56, passing to the southeast of Shady Plain. The road heads into South Bend Township and continues east through more farmland and woodland with some residences. PA 56/PA 156 crosses the Crooked Creek and passes through South Bend, crossing the creek again and turning to the northeast, coming to an intersection with PA 210. The road enters Armstrong Township in Indiana County and heads through more rural areas. PA 56/PA 156 crosses Norfolk Southern's Keystone Power Plant Lead railroad line before heading across the Crooked Creek into the borough of Shelocta and passing homes and businesses as it comes to an intersection with US 422. At this point, PA 156 ends and PA 56 turns east to form a concurrency with US 422.

== Major intersections ==
County	Location	mi	km	Destinations	Notes
Westmoreland	Bell Township	0.000	0.000	PA 981 (Tintown Road)	
Armstrong	Kiskiminetas Township	7.288	11.729	PA 56 west – Apollo	South end of PA 56 overlap
Armstrong	South Bend Township	13.419	21.596	PA 210 north – Elderton	Southern terminus of PA 210
Indiana	Shelocta	16.386	26.371	US 422 / PA 56 east (Benjamin Franklin Highway) – Kittanning, Indiana	North end of PA 56 overlap
1.000 mi = 1.609 km; 1.000 km = 0.621 mi: Concurrency terminus
