= Pennsylvania Route 56 =

State highway in Pennsylvania, US

Pennsylvania Route 56
- PA 56 highlighted in red and PA 56 Truck in blue

Route information
- Maintained by PennDOT and City of New Kensington
- Length: 108.055 mi (173.898 km)

Major junctions
- West end: C.L. Schmitt Bridge in New Kensington
- US 422 near Indiana; US 119 in Homer City; US 22 in Armagh; US 219 near Johnstown; I-99 / US 220 near Bedford
- East end: US 30 near Bedford

Location
- Country: United States
- State: Pennsylvania
- Counties: Westmoreland, Armstrong, Indiana, Cambria, Somerset, Bedford

Highway system
- Pennsylvania State Route System; Interstate; US; State; Scenic; Legislative
← PA 55	→ PA 57

Pennsylvania Route 56 (PA 56) is a 108-mile-long (174 km) state highway that is located in west central Pennsylvania in the United States.

Its western terminus is situated at the eastern end of the C.L. Schmitt Bridge in New Kensington. Its eastern terminus is located on U.S. Route 30 (US 30) west of Bedford.

== Route description ==
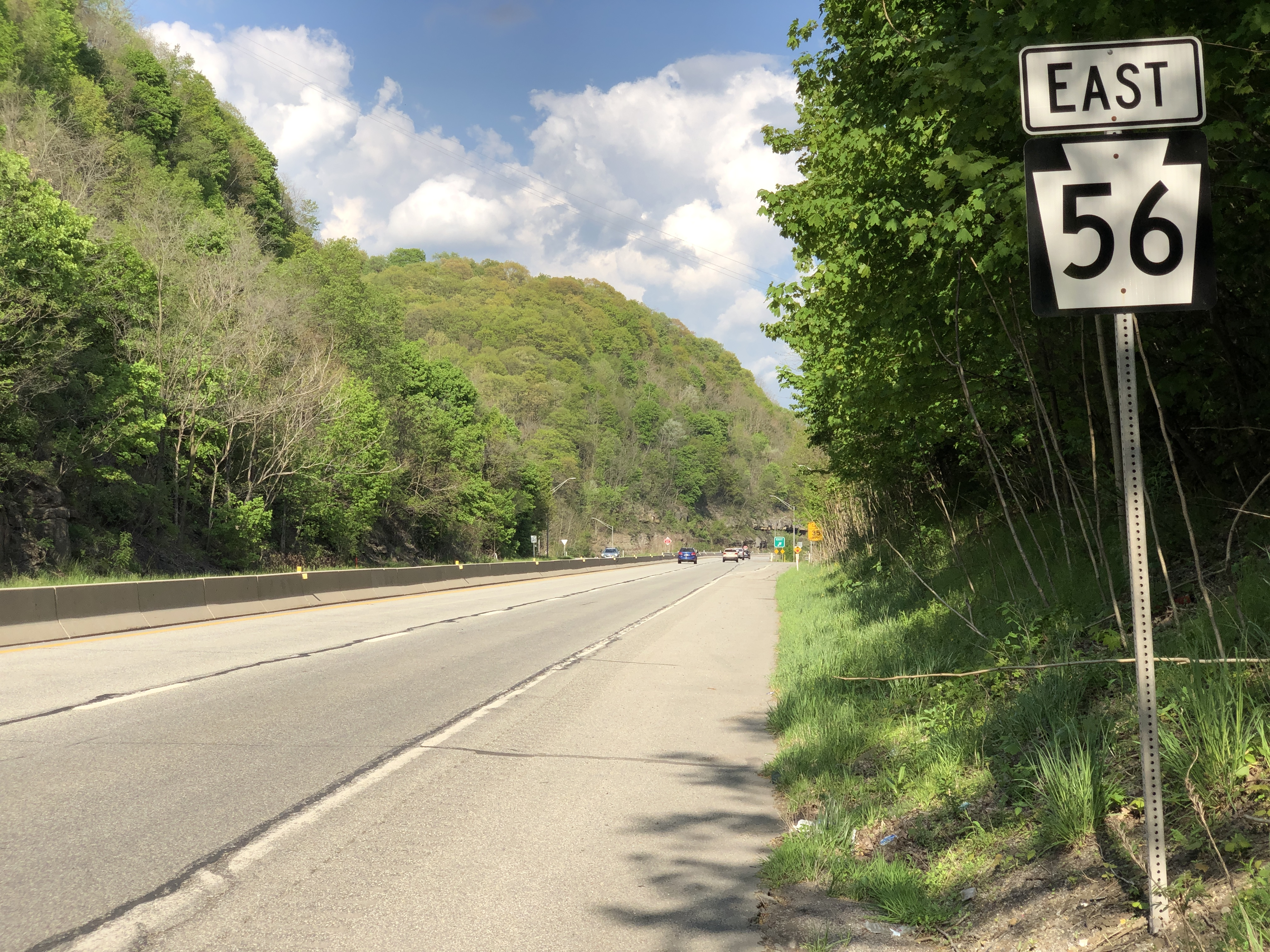
PA 56 eastbound past the Bedford Street interchange in Johnstown

PA 56 starts at the intersection of Industrial Boulevard and 9th Street in New Kensington, Westmoreland County; this is also the eastern end of the C.L. Schmitt Bridge, across the Allegheny River from the PA 28 freeway. In New Kensington, PA 56 first heads south along Industrial Boulevard before turning east onto 7th Street where it first encounters a short city-maintained section of road before transitioning back to state maintenance. In the east part of New Kensington, it has a concurrency with PA 366 before entering the city of Lower Burrell. Also in Westmoreland County, it has concurrencies with PA 356 and PA 66 Alternate.

After crossing the Kiskiminetas River, PA 56 merges with PA 66 for a short distance in Armstrong County. It then travels east and eventually merges with PA 156, crossing into Indiana County. At this point, it merges with US 422 and heads toward Indiana. In Indiana, US 422 and PA 56 become a short freeway. At the U.S. 119 exit, PA 56 merges with US 119, heading south.

PA 56 ends its concurrency with US 119 in Homer City and continues east on a two-lane road. Approaching Armagh, it crosses US 22 at an interchange. The route then enters Westmoreland County again briefly, passing through its extreme northeastern corner. It is at this point, that PA 56 crosses through Seward. A short time after passing through Seward, it crosses into Cambria County. Continuing east, it travels along the southern side of the Conemaugh River through the Conemaugh Gap. It then emerges into the city of Johnstown.

PA 56 travels through the heart of the West End section of Johnstown on two-lane city streets. It then merges with PA 403 on Broad Street, a four-lane road containing many traffic signals. At the final signal, it breaks away from PA 403 and becomes a freeway entitled Johnstown Expressway. PA 56 enters the four-lane expressway and meets US 219. It eventually exits US 219 at Scalp Avenue, the original interchange, and continues east toward Windber.

The route enters Somerset County at Windber. Once past Windber, 56 returns to two lanes. It enters Bedford County at the top of Laurel Ridge at 2,700 feet (820 m) above sea level. The descent down the eastern slope contains a dangerous hairpin curve that has been the site of many accidents over the years.

It then crosses Interstate 99 (I-99) US 220 at an interchange near Cessna. After a short distance, PA 56 crosses over I-99 and US 220, then later passes under the Pennsylvania Turnpike (I-76 and I-70). The route ends at a T intersection with US 30 in Wolfsburg, west of Bedford.

== Major intersections ==
County	Location	mi	km	Destinations	Notes
Westmoreland	New Kensington	0.000	0.000	Orange Belt west (C.L. Schmitt Bridge) / Industrial Boulevard / 9th Street	Western terminus; west end of Orange Belt concurrency
Westmoreland	New Kensington	0.223	0.359	PA 56 Truck east / Orange Belt (Industrial Boulevard)	Western terminus of PA 56 Truck; east end of Orange Belt concurrency
Westmoreland	New Kensington	0.864	1.390	PA 366 south / PA 56 Truck west (Stevenson Boulevard) / 7th Street	West end of PA 366 concurrency; eastern terminus of PA 56 Truck
Westmoreland	New Kensington	0.999	1.608	PA 780 east (Powers Drive) – Penn State New Kensington	Western terminus of PA 780
Westmoreland	New Kensington	1.552– 1.839	2.498– 2.960	PA 366 north (Tarentum Bridge Road) – Tarentum	Trumpet interchange; east end of PA 366 concurrency
Westmoreland	Allegheny Township	9.081	14.614	PA 356 north – Freeport	West end of PA 356 concurrency
Westmoreland	Allegheny Township	9.612	15.469	PA 356 south – North Washington	East end of PA 356 concurrency
Westmoreland	Vandergrift	13.277	21.367	PA 66 Alt. south (Washington Avenue)	West end of PA 66 Alt. concurrency; eastbound PA 56 only
Armstrong	North Vandergrift	13.831	22.259	PA 66 north – Lincoln Street, Leechburg PA 66 Alt. north (First Street) – Kittanning	West end of PA 66 concurrency; east end of PA 66 Alt. concurrency
Armstrong	Apollo	16.403	26.398	PA 66 south (1st Street) – Greensburg	East end of PA 66 concurrency
Armstrong	Kiskiminetas Township	23.693	38.130	PA 156 south – Avonmore, Maysville	West end of PA 156 concurrency
Armstrong	South Bend Township	29.823	47.995	PA 210 north – Elderton	Southern terminus of PA 210
Indiana	Shelocta	32.801	52.788	US 422 west – Kittanning PA 156 ends	West end of US 422 concurrency; east end of PA 156 concurrency; Northern terminus of PA 156
Indiana	Armstrong Township	37.694	60.663	West end of freeway	
Indiana	Armstrong Township	37.694– 38.048	60.663– 61.232	US 422 Bus. east (Philadelphia Street)	Western terminus of US 422 Bus.; interchange
Indiana	White Township	39.879– 40.360	64.179– 64.953	PA 286 (Oakland Avenue) / PA 286 Truck begins	Western terminus of PA 286 Truck; to Indiana University of Pennsylvania; diamond interchange
Indiana	White Township	42.295– 42.729	68.067– 68.766	US 119 north / PA 286 Truck north / US 422 east – Punxsutawney, Ebensburg	West end of US 119 concurrency; east end of US 422 / PA 286 Truck concurrencies; cloverleaf interchange
Indiana	White Township	43.064– 43.402	69.305– 69.849	US 422 Bus. west (Wayne Avenue) – Indiana University of Pennsylvania	Eastern terminus of US 422 Bus.; trumpet interchange
Indiana	White Township	44.004	70.818	East end of freeway	
Indiana	Homer City	45.872	73.824	US 119 south / SR 3056 (Ridge Avenue)	East end of US 119 concurrency
Indiana	Center Township	48.690	78.359	PA 954 north	Southern terminus of PA 954
Indiana	Brush Valley Township	51.397	82.715	PA 259 north (Yellow Creek Park Road) / Valley View Road – Nolo	West end of PA 259 concurrency
Indiana	Brush Valley Township	51.453	82.806	PA 259 south	East end of PA 259 concurrency
Indiana	Armagh	57.571– 57.704	92.652– 92.866	US 22 (William Penn Highway) – Blairsville, Ebensburg	Partial cloverleaf interchange
Indiana	East Wheatfield Township	60.058	96.654	PA 711 north (Charles Road) / SR 2008 (Power Plant Road)	West end of PA 711 concurrency
Westmoreland	Seward	60.695	97.679	PA 711 south – New Florence	East end of PA 711 concurrency
Cambria	Johnstown	68.104	109.603	PA 403 north (Cooper Avenue)	West end of PA 403 concurrency
Cambria	Johnstown	69.942	112.561	PA 403 south (Napoleon Street)	East end of PA 403 concurrency
Cambria	Johnstown	69.942	112.561	West end of freeway	
Cambria	Johnstown	70.826	113.983	To PA 271 / PA 403 south (Bedford Street)	Westbound exit and eastbound entrance; partial diamond interchange
Cambria	Johnstown	71.854– 71.931	115.638– 115.762	Geistown, Dale	Eastbound entrance and exit; access via Bedford Street
Cambria	Johnstown	72.156– 72.437	116.124– 116.576	Widman Street	Diamond interchange
Cambria	Richland Township	74.215– 74.595	119.437– 120.049	Walters Avenue	Partial cloverleaf interchange
Cambria	Richland Township	75.285– 75.558	121.159– 121.599	US 219 north – Ebensburg	West end of US 219 concurrency; trumpet interchange
Cambria	Richland Township	76.289– 76.601	122.775– 123.277	PA 756 – Elton, Geistown	Diamond interchange
Cambria	Richland Township	77.021– 77.296	123.953– 124.396	US 219 south (Scalp Avenue West) / SR 3016 – Somerset	East end of US 219 concurrency; partial cloverleaf interchange
Cambria	Richland Township	77.231	124.291	East end of freeway	
Somerset	Paint	79.425– 79.629	127.822– 128.150	PA 601 / SR 4051 (Main Street) – Scalp Level, Paint	Northern terminus of PA 601; partial cloverleaf interchange
Somerset	Windber	81.106	130.527	PA 160 (Pomroy Drive / 21st Street) – Windber, Central City	
Bedford	Pleasantville	96.147	154.734	PA 96 (Cortland Road / King St. Clair Road) – Schellsburg, Weyant, Blue Knob State Park	
Bedford	Bedford Township	104.007– 104.198	167.383– 167.690	I-99 / US 220 to Penna Turnpike – Bedford, Altoona	Interstate 99 exit 3; diamond interchange
Bedford	Bedford Township	104.743	168.568	US 220 Bus. to I-76 / Penna Turnpike – Bedford, Bedford County Airport	Northern terminus of US 220 Bus.
Bedford	Bedford Township	108.055	173.898	US 30 (Lincoln Highway) – Bedford, Schellsburg	Eastern terminus
1.000 mi = 1.609 km; 1.000 km = 0.621 mi: Concurrency terminus; Incomplete access

== PA 56 Truck ==
=== Current ===
Pennsylvania Route 56 Truck
- Location: New Kensington, Pennsylvania
- Existed: 1980–present

Pennsylvania Route 56 Truck is a 2-mile-long (3.2 km) truck route in the Pittsburgh industrial suburb of New Kensington, Pennsylvania. The route's western terminus also marks the end of its parent, as each formulate a different way of travel for those who have crossed the C.L. Schmitt Bridge. While Route 56 makes several turns as it passes through the stop light-filled center of the community, the truck route runs as the four-lane Industrial Boulevard along the Allegheny River, before turning back north as it is multiplexed with Pennsylvania Route 366.

=== Former ===
Pennsylvania Route 56 Truck
- Location: Indiana County, Pennsylvania
- Existed: 2013–2015

Pennsylvania Route 56 Truck was an east-west truck route bypassing a weight-restricted bridge over Little Brush Creek in Brush Valley, on which trucks over 29 tons and combination loads over 40 tons were prohibited. It was formed and established in 2013 and it used to follow US 119 and US 22. As of October 2015, the "Truck PA 56" signs were removed off of US 22 and US 119.
