= Pennsylvania Route 110 =

State highway in Indiana County, Pennsylvania, US

Pennsylvania Route 110

Route information
- Maintained by PennDOT
- Length: 5.71 mi (9.19 km)
- Existed: 1928–present

Major junctions
- West end: PA 954 in Creekside
- East end: US 119 near Ernest

Location
- Country: United States
- State: Pennsylvania
- Counties: Indiana

Highway system
- Pennsylvania State Route System; Interstate; US; State; Scenic; Legislative
← PA 108	→ US 111

Pennsylvania Route 110 (PA 110) is a 5.71-mile (9.19 km) state highway located in Indiana County, Pennsylvania. The western terminus is at PA 954 in Creekside. The eastern terminus is at U.S. Route 119 (US 119) near Ernest.

== Route description ==
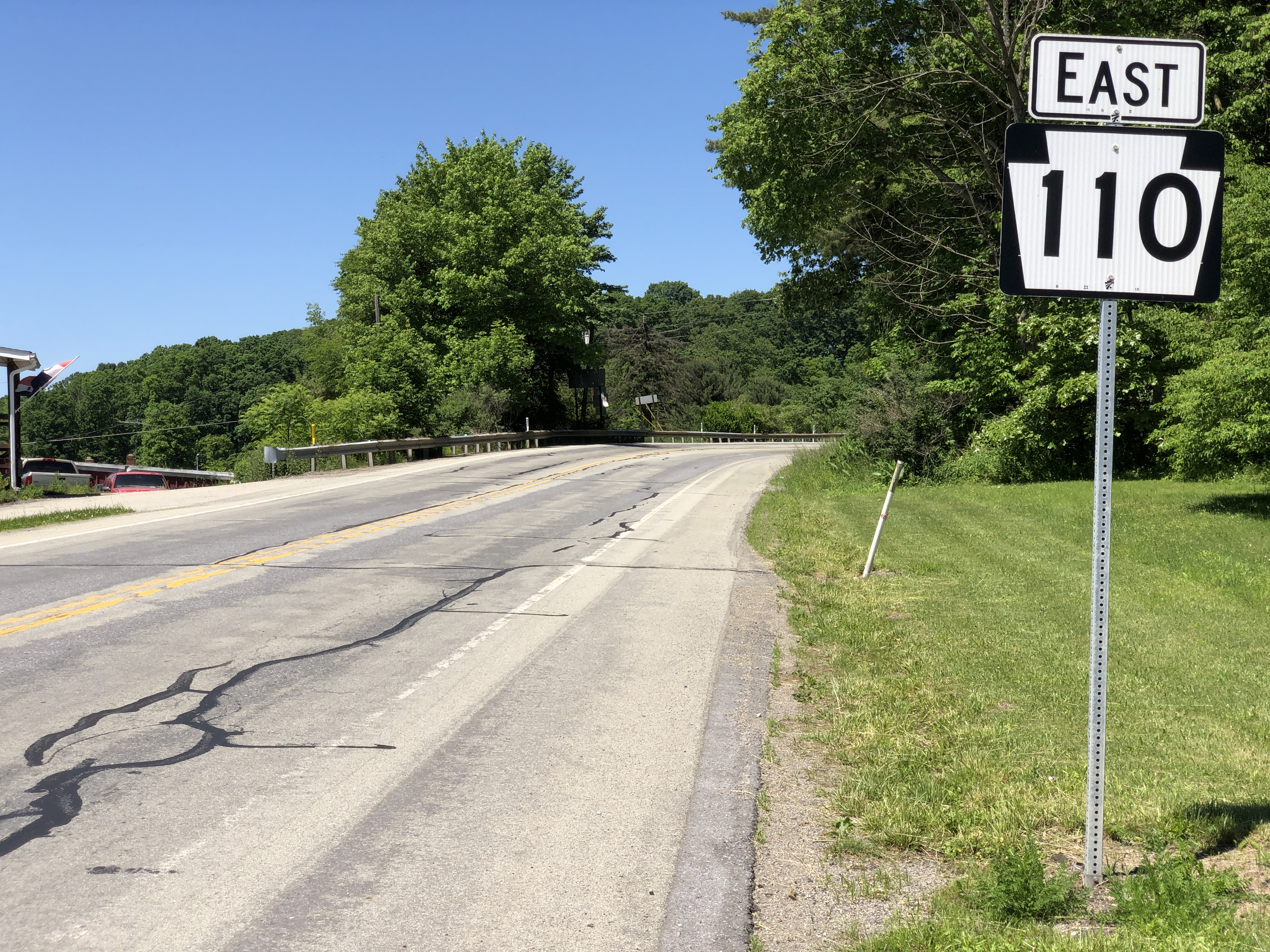
PA 110 eastbound in White Township

PA 110 begins at an intersection with PA 954 in the borough of Creekside, heading southeast on two-lane undivided Indiana Road past homes. The road passes under Norfolk Southern's Shelocta Running Track railroad line before continuing into Washington Township, where it crosses a Buffalo and Pittsburgh Railroad line at-grade. The route continues east through hilly woodland, running to the north of the railroad line and McKee Run. PA 110 continues into Rayne Township before entering the borough of Ernest, where the road becomes Main Street and passes residences. After leaving Ernest for Rayne Township again, the route heads east away from the creek and railroad and runs through forested areas with a few homes and small farms as an unnamed road. PA 110 curves south into White Township and reaches an intersection with Old Route 119 and turns sharply to the northeast, following Old Route 119. The route heads through rural areas of residences before reaching its terminus at a trumpet interchange with US 119.

== Major intersections ==
The entire route is in Indiana County.

Location	mi	km	Destinations	Notes
Creekside	0.00	0.00	PA 954 (Shelocta Street / Chambersville Road) – Indiana, Plumville	Western terminus
White Township	5.71	9.19	US 119 (Buffalo-Pittsburgh Highway) – Punxsutawney, Blairsville	Interchange; eastern terminus
1.000 mi = 1.609 km; 1.000 km = 0.621 mi
