= Atwood, Pennsylvania =

Borough in Pennsylvania, US

- Borough
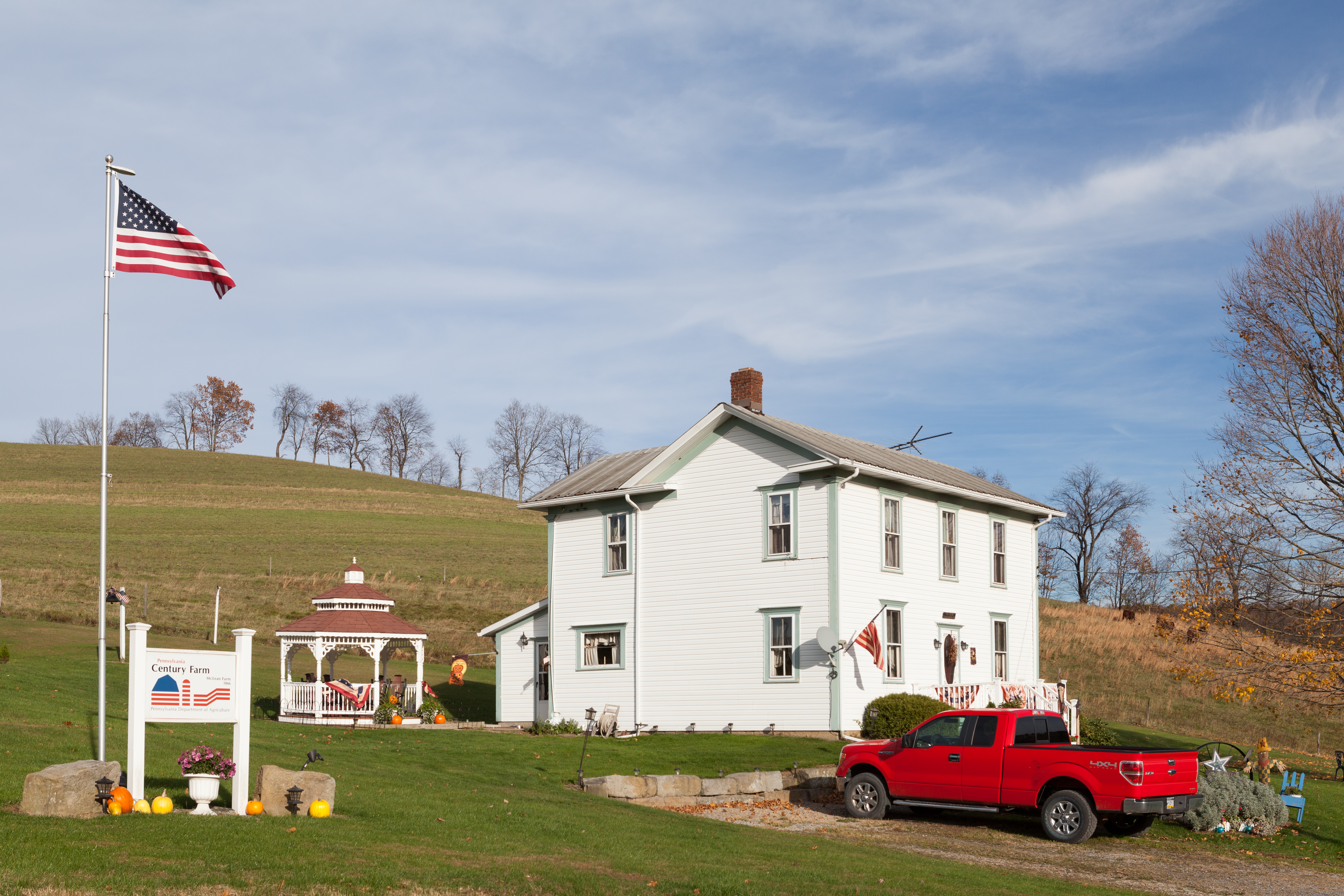
- McLean Farm, a Pennsylvania Century Farm in Atwood

- Location of Atwood in Armstrong County, Pennsylvania.

- Location within Pennsylvania
- Coordinates: 40°44′58″N 79°15′51″W
- Country: United States
- State: Pennsylvania
- County: Armstrong
- Settled: 1860
- Incorporated: 1884

Government
  - Type: Council-Mayor
  - Mayor: Dean Gress

Area
  - Total: 2.11 sq mi (5.47 km^{2})
  - Land: 2.09 sq mi (5.42 km^{2})
  - Water: 0.019 sq mi (0.05 km^{2})

Population (2020)
  - Total: 112
  - Density: 53.5/sq mi (20.67/km^{2})
- Time zone: UTC-5 (Eastern (EST))
  - Summer (DST): UTC-4 (EDT)
- FIPS code: 42-03480

Atwood is a borough in Armstrong County, Pennsylvania, United States. The population was 112 at the 2020 census.

== Geography ==
Atwood is located at 40°44′58″N 79°15′51″W (40.749400, −79.264057) in eastern Armstrong County. Pennsylvania Route 210 runs through the borough, leading 6 miles (10 km) southwest to U.S. Route 422 at Elderton and 6 miles (10 km) northeast to Plumville. Keystone Lake, a reservoir on the North Branch Plum Creek, runs near the northwestern border of the borough.

According to the United States Census Bureau, the borough has a total area of 2.1 square miles (5.5 km^{2}), of which 2.1 square miles (5.4 km^{2}) is land and 0.039 square miles (0.1 km^{2}), or 1.00%, is water.

== Demographics ==
Historical population
Census	Pop.	Note	%±
1880	149		—
1890	185		24.2%
1900	153		−17.3%
1910	191		24.8%
1920	168		−12.0%
1930	135		−19.6%
1940	129		−4.4%
1950	110		−14.7%
1960	131		19.1%
1970	123		−6.1%
1980	107		−13.0%
1990	128		19.6%
2000	112		−12.5%
2010	107		−4.5%
2020	112		4.7%

As of the 2000 census, there were 112 people, 42 households, and 34 families residing in the borough. The population density was 53.4 inhabitants per square mile (20.6/km^{2}). There were 43 housing units at an average density of 20.5 per square mile (7.9/km^{2}). The racial makeup of the borough was 96.43% White, 3.57% from other races. Hispanic or Latino of any race were 3.57% of the population.

There were 42 households, out of which 38.1% had children under the age of 18 living with them, 69.0% were married couples living together, 9.5% had a female householder with no husband present, and 19.0% were non-families. 19.0% of all households were made up of individuals, and 7.1% had someone living alone who was 65 years of age or older. The average household size was 2.67 and the average family size was 3.06.

The borough median age of 39 years was slightly less than the county median age of 40 years. The distribution by age group was 25.0% under the age of 18, 7.1% from 18 to 24, 34.8% from 25 to 44, 20.5% from 45 to 64, and 12.5% who were 65 years of age or older. The median age was 39 years. For every 100 females, there were 89.8 males. For every 100 females age 18 and over, there were 90.9 males.

The median income for a household in the borough was $28,750, and the median income for a family was $29,750. Males had a median income of $35,625 versus $12,188 for females. The per capita income for the borough was $12,026. There were 18.2% of families and 10.6% of the population living below the poverty line, including 8.3% of under eighteens and none of those over 64.

== Cemetery ==
- Atwood Cemetery
