= Pennsylvania Route 839 =

State highway in Armstrong County, Pennsylvania, US

Pennsylvania Route 839

Route information
- Maintained by PennDOT
- Length: 21.29 mi (34.26 km)

Major junctions
- South end: PA 85 in Cowanshannock Township
- North end: PA 28 / PA 66 in South Bethlehem

Location
- Country: United States
- State: Pennsylvania
- Counties: Armstrong

Highway system
- Pennsylvania State Route System; Interstate; US; State; Scenic; Legislative
← PA 838	→ PA 840

Pennsylvania Route 839 (PA 839) is a 21.29-mile-long (34.26 km) state highway located in Armstrong County, Pennsylvania. The southern terminus is at PA 85 in Cowanshannock Township. The northern terminus is at PA 28/PA 66 in South Bethlehem.

== Route description ==
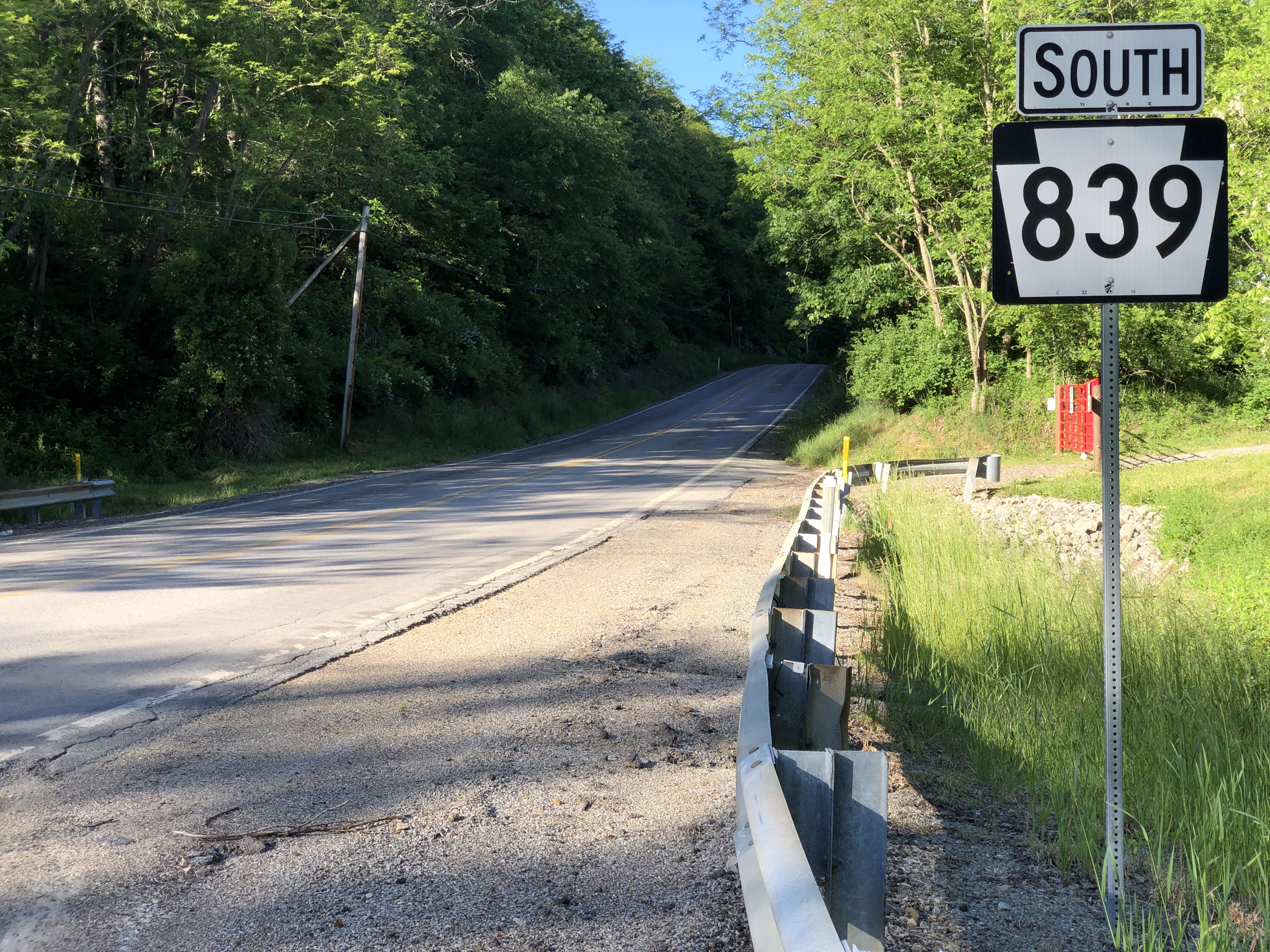
PA 839 southbound in Redbank Township

PA 839 begins at an intersection with PA 85 in Cowanshannock Township, heading to the northeast through agricultural areas. The road curves to the north and continues into Wayne Township. After passing through more farmland, the route enters the borough of Dayton and becomes South State Street, passing homes. PA 839 turns east onto East Main Street and passes more development before turning north onto Milton Street. The road heads back into Wayne Township and enters farmland, crossing the Buffalo and Pittsburgh Railroad's B&P Main Line Subdivision line. From here, the route becomes an unnamed road and winds northeast through a mix of fields and woods, crossing over Mahoning Creek. PA 839 passes through Milton before entering Redbank Township and continuing north through a mix of hilly farms and woods, passing through McGregor. The road makes a turn to the west and heads through more rural areas, running through McWilliams. The route heads northwest before turning west into Mahoning Township and passing through areas of agriculture. PA 839 heads north into forested areas, where it makes a sharp turn to the west. The route enters the borough of South Bethlehem and continues north along Putneyville Road, passing homes before reaching its terminus at PA 28/PA 66.

== Major intersections ==
The entire route is in Armstrong County.

Location	mi	km	Destinations	Notes
Cowanshannock Township	0.00	0.00	PA 85	Southern terminus
South Bethlehem	21.29	34.26	PA 28 / PA 66 (West Broad Street) – Kittanning, New Bethlehem	Northern terminus
1.000 mi = 1.609 km; 1.000 km = 0.621 mi

== PA 839 Truck ==
Pennsylvania Route 839 Truck
- Location: Armstrong County, Pennsylvania
- Existed: 2013–2015

Pennsylvania Route 839 Truck was a truck route bypassing a weight-restricted bridge over Glade Run on which trucks over 35 tons and combination loads over 40 tons were prohibited. It was signed in 2013. The bridge was reconstructed in 2015, effectively deleting the route.
