= Marchand, Pennsylvania =

Unincorporated community in Pennsylvania, US

- Unincorporated community
- Location within Pennsylvania Location within the United States
- Coordinates: 40°51′27″N 79°01′22″W
- Country: United States
- State: Pennsylvania
- County: Indiana
- Township: North Mahoning
- Elevation: 1,558 ft (475 m)
- Time zone: UTC-5 (Eastern (EST))
  - Summer (DST): UTC-4 (EDT)
- ZIP code: 15758
- Area code: 724
- GNIS feature ID: 1180390

Marchand is an unincorporated community in Indiana County, Pennsylvania, United States. The community is located on U.S. Route 119, 6.2 miles (10.0 km) north of Marion Center. Marchand had a post office until it closed on April 23, 2005; it still has its own ZIP code, 15758.
