= C. L. Schmitt Bridge =

Bridge in Pennsylvania, U.S.

C.L. Schmitt Bridge
- Coordinates: 40°33′51″N 79°46′20″W
- Carries: 2 lanes of traffic
- Crosses: Allegheny River
- Locale: New Kensington and East Deer Township
- Other name: New Kensington Bridge

Characteristics
- Design: Truss bridge
- Material: Steel
- Total length: 460.2 metres (1,510 ft)
- Longest span: 350 feet (110 m)
- No. of spans: 3
- Piers in water: 2
- Clearance below: 49.8 feet (15.2 m)

History
- Opened: June 29, 1927

Location
- Interactive map of C.L. Schmitt Bridge

The C.L. Schmitt Bridge (commonly known as the New Kensington Bridge or the Ninth Street Bridge) is a truss bridge that carries vehicular traffic across the Allegheny River between New Kensington and East Deer Township, Pennsylvania in the United States.

== History ==
The bridge was constructed on June 29, 1927 to connect Pennsylvania Route 56 (PA 56), which has its terminus on the New Kensington side of the bridge, and PA 28, the major westbank artery. Today, PA 28 has become a freeway, and the former highway is known as Freeport Road. The bridge is named for former Democratic State Senator C. L. Schmitt, who represented a suburban and rural district on the eastbank of the Allegheny and who is considered the father of consumer protection laws.

== See also ==
- List of crossings of the Allegheny River
