= North Mahoning Township, Pennsylvania =

Township in Pennsylvania, US

Coordinates: 40°53′00″N 78°59′36″W

North Mahoning Township, Indiana County, Pennsylvania
- Township
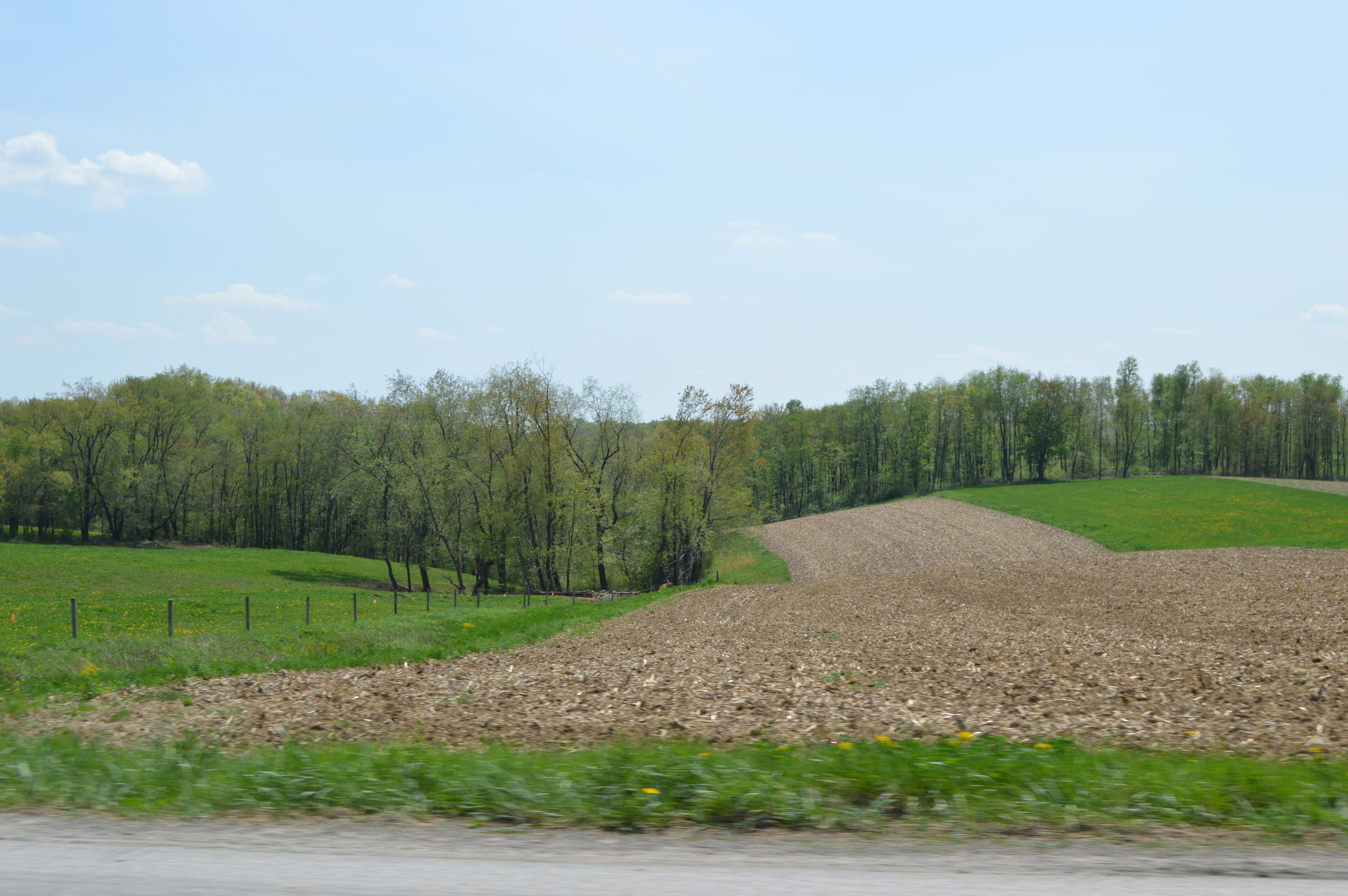
- Fields east of Trade City

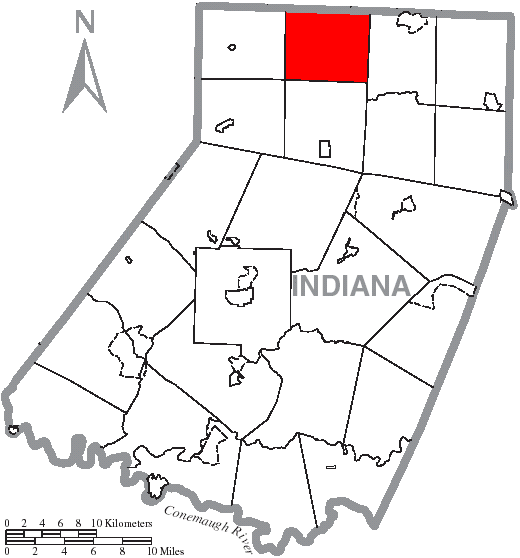
- Map of Indiana County, Pennsylvania Highlighting North Mahoning Township

- Map of Pennsylvania highlighting Indiana County
- Country: United States
- State: Pennsylvania
- County: Indiana

Area
  - Total: 28.31 sq mi (73.33 km^{2})
  - Land: 28.21 sq mi (73.07 km^{2})
  - Water: 0.10 sq mi (0.26 km^{2})

Population (2020)
  - Total: 1,349
  - Estimate (2021): 1,360
  - Density: 48.2/sq mi (18.61/km^{2})
- Time zone: UTC-5 (Eastern (EST))
  - Summer (DST): UTC-4 (EDT)
- FIPS code: 42-063-55184

North Mahoning Township is a township that is located in Indiana County, Pennsylvania, United States. The population was 1,349 at the time of the 2020 census.

== History ==
Some of the historic communities in this township are Covode (previously called Kellysville), Marchand, and Trade City (previously Davidsville).

== Geography ==
According to the United States Census Bureau, the township has a total area of 28.3 square miles (73.3 km^{2}), all land.

== Demographics ==
Historical population
Census	Pop.	Note	%±
1850	840		—
1860	1,175		39.9%
1870	1,263		7.5%
1880	1,317		4.3%
1890	1,255		−4.7%
1900	1,122		−10.6%
1910	990		−11.8%
1920	953		−3.7%
1930	870		−8.7%
1940	954		9.7%
1950	893		−6.4%
1960	835		−6.5%
1970	917		9.8%
1980	1,174		28.0%
1990	1,254		6.8%
2000	1,383		10.3%
2010	1,428		3.3%
2020	1,349		−5.5%
2021 (est.)	1,345		−0.3%
U.S. Decennial Census

As of the census of 2000, there were 1,383 people, 464 households, and 368 families residing in the township.

The population density was 48.8 inhabitants per square mile (18.8/km^{2}). There were 522 housing units at an average density of 18.4/sq mi (7.1/km^{2}).

The racial makeup of the township was 98.63% White, 0.29% African American, and 1.08% from two or more races. Hispanic or Latino of any race were 0.07% of the population.

There were 464 households, out of which 36.6% had children under the age of eighteen; 70.5% were married couples living together, 4.3% had a female householder with no husband present, and 20.5% were non-families. 18.5% of all households were made up of individuals, and 9.9% had someone living alone who was sixty-five years of age or older.

The average household size was 2.94 and the average family size was 3.37.

Within the township, the population was spread out, with 29.6% of residents who were under the age of eighteen, 8.6% who were aged eighteen to twenty-four, 26.5% who were aged twenty-five to forty-four, 22.1% who were aged forty-five to sixty-four, and 13.2% who were sixty-five years of age or older. The median age was thirty-six years.

For every one hundred females there were 102.2 males. For every one hundred females who were aged eighteen or older, there were 99.4 males.

The median income for a household in the township was $31,250, and the median income for a family was $35,109. Males had a median income of $28,125 compared with that of $17,132 for females.

The per capita income for the township was $12,365.

Approximately 14.1% of families and 16.9% of the population were living below the poverty line, including 24.8% of those who were under the age of eighteen and 16.8% of those who were aged sixty-five or older.

== Gallery ==
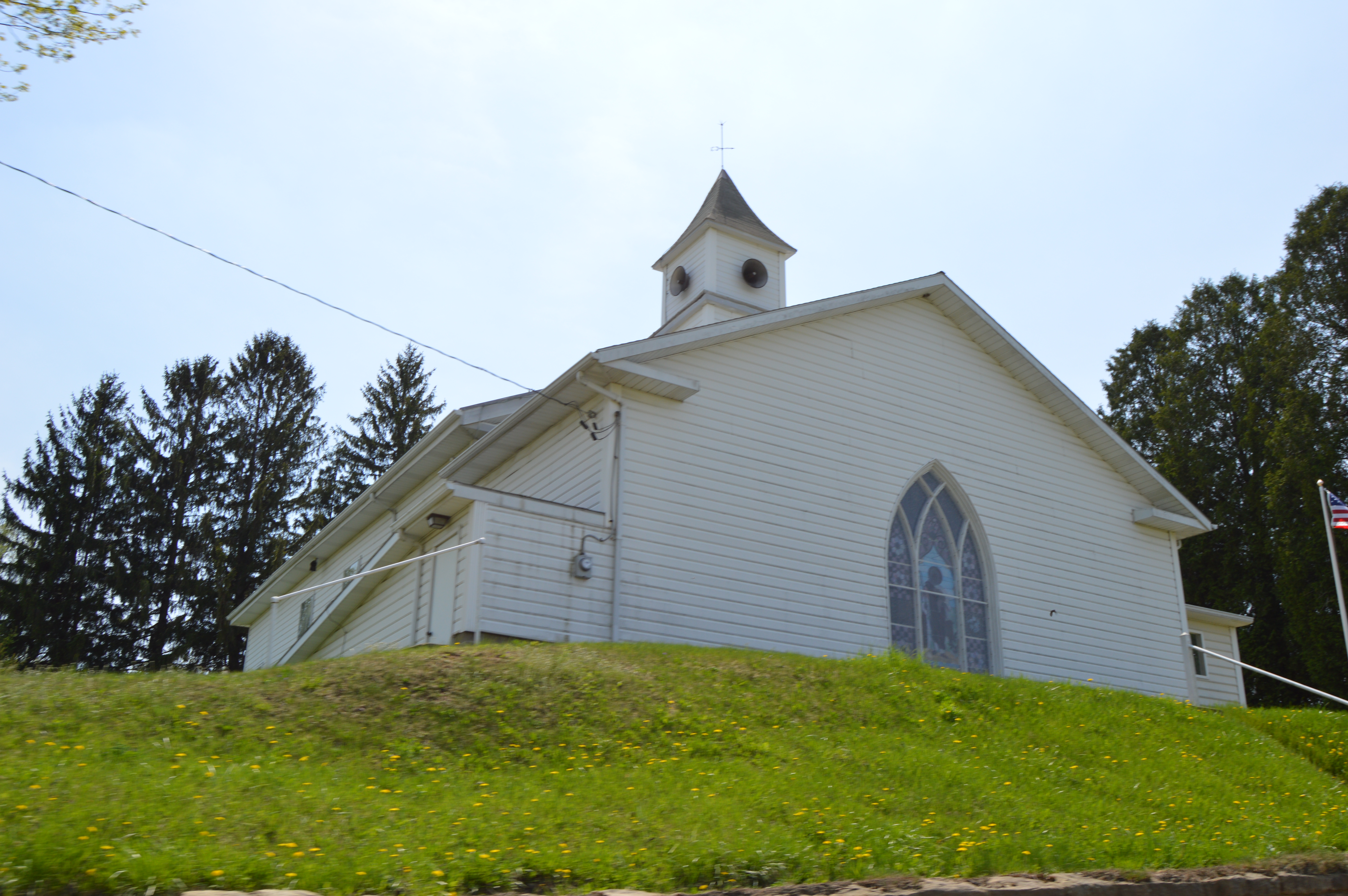
Zion Lutheran Church, Trade City, Pennsylvania
