= Beyer, Pennsylvania =

- Unincorporated community
- Location within Pennsylvania
- Coordinates: 40°47′11″N 79°12′04″W
- Country: United States
- State: Pennsylvania
- County: Indiana
- Elevation: 1,155 ft (352 m)
- Time zone: UTC-5 (Eastern (EST))
  - Summer (DST): UTC-4 (EDT)
- ZIP code: 16211
- Area code: 724
- GNIS feature ID: 1169464

Beyer is an unincorporated community in Indiana County, Pennsylvania, United States. The community is located on Pennsylvania Route 85 1 mile (1.6 km) west-southwest of Plumville. Beyer has a post office with ZIP code 16211, which opened on May 13, 1918.
