= Plumcreek Township, Pennsylvania =

Township in Pennsylvania, US

Coordinates: 40°42′39″N 79°21′04″W

- Township
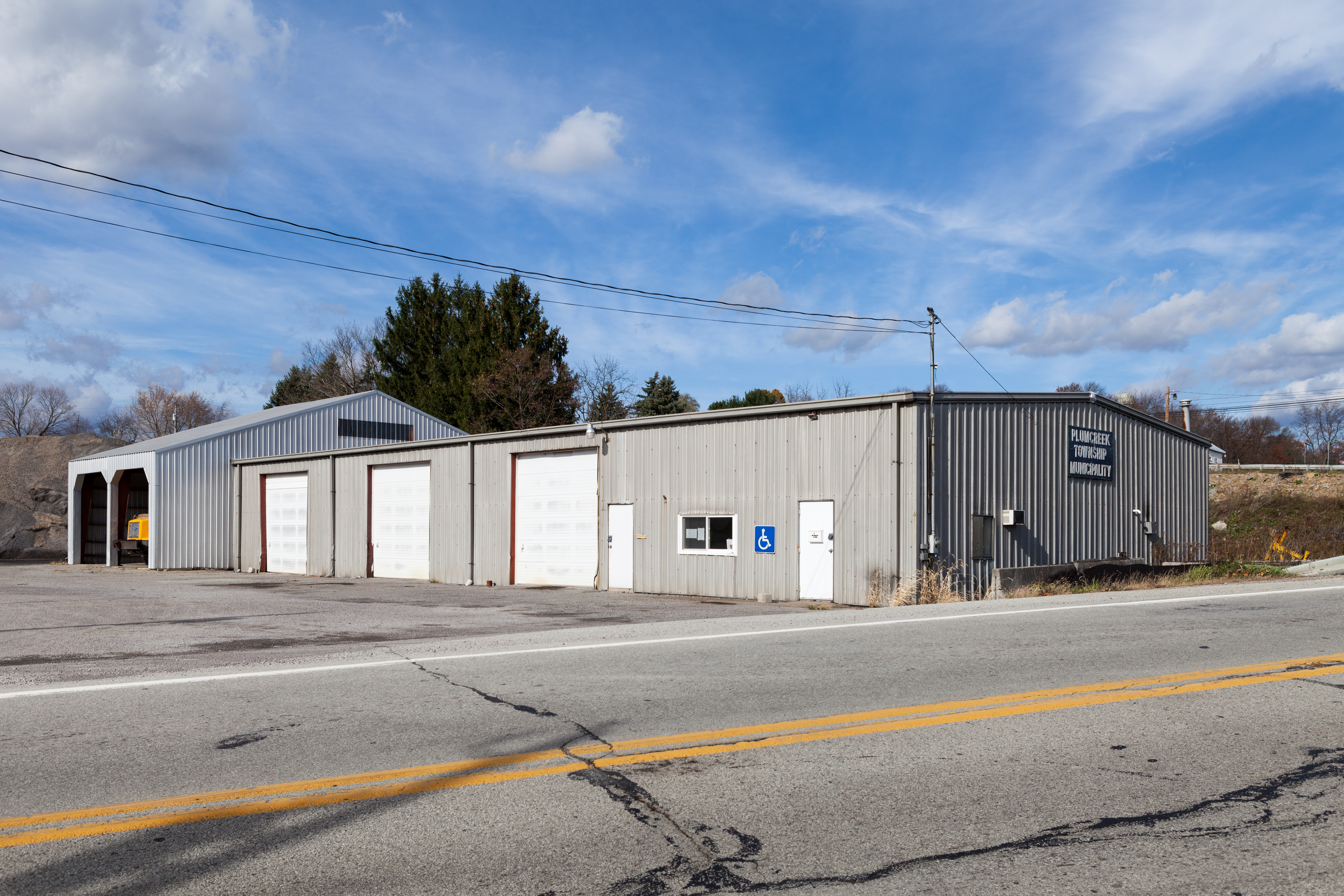
- Plumcreek Township Municipal Building

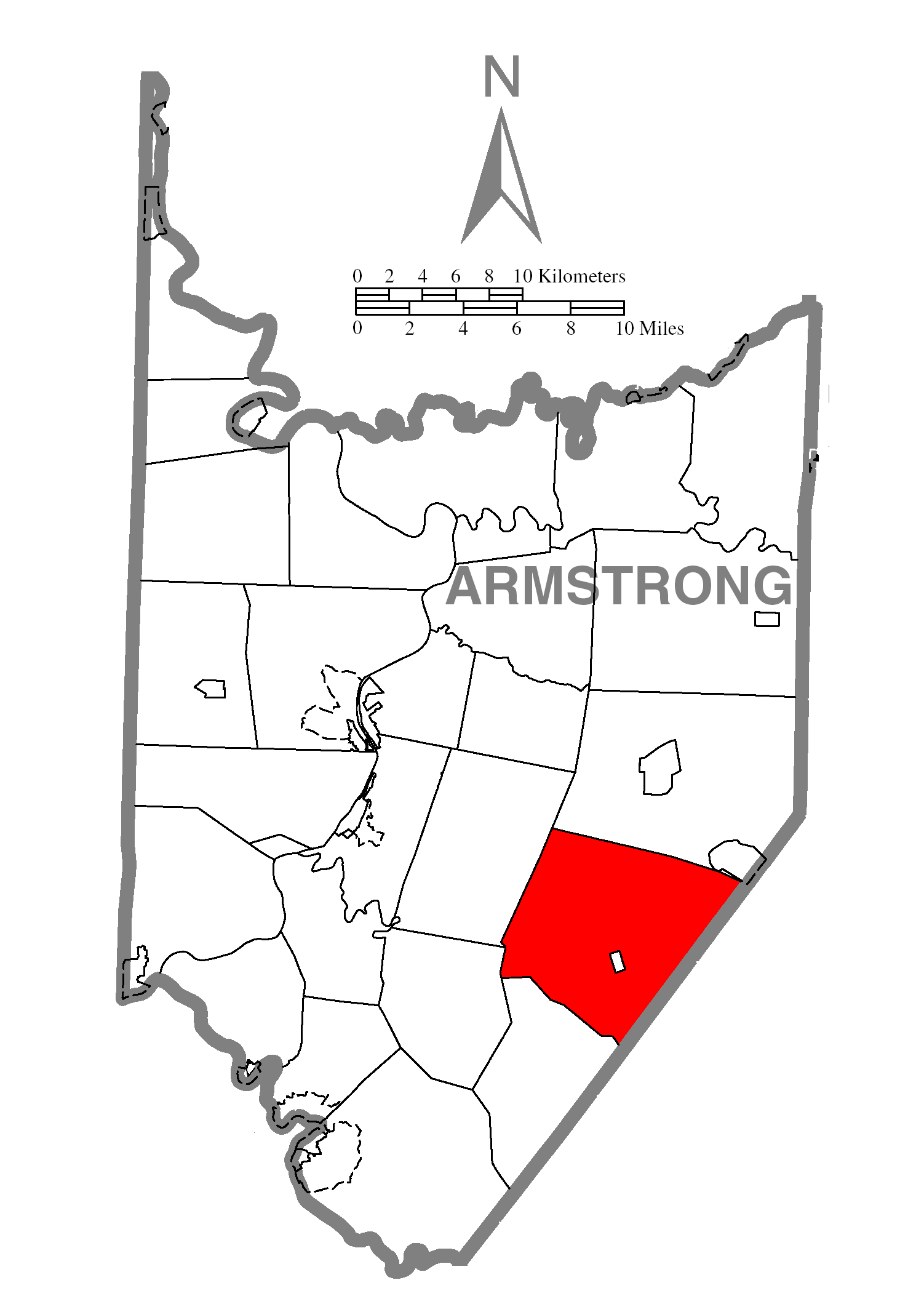
- Map of Armstrong County, Pennsylvania, highlighting Plumcreek Township

- Map of Armstrong County, Pennsylvania
- Country: United States
- State: Pennsylvania
- County: Armstrong
- Settled: 1788
- Incorporated: 1809

Area
  - Total: 43.05 sq mi (111.49 km^{2})
  - Land: 42.38 sq mi (109.76 km^{2})
  - Water: 0.67 sq mi (1.73 km^{2})

Population (2020)
  - Total: 2,106
  - Estimate (2021): 2,091
  - Density: 53.5/sq mi (20.66/km^{2})
- Time zone: UTC-5 (Eastern (EST))
  - Summer (DST): UTC-4 (EDT)
- FIPS code: 42-005-61576

Plumcreek Township is a township that is located in Armstrong County, Pennsylvania, United States. The population was 2,106 at the time of the 2020 census, a decrease from the figure of 2,375 that was tabulated in 2010.

== History ==
Plum Creek Township appears in the 1876 Atlas of Armstrong County, Pennsylvania. Its early history is detailed in Robert Walter Smith's 1883 History of Armstrong County.

=== Cemeteries ===
- Gastown Cemetery
- Mount Union Lutheran Church Cemetery
- Rowley Cemetery
- Whitesburg Presbyterian Cemetery
- Whitesburg United Methodist Church Cemetery

== Geography ==
Plumcreek Township is located in southeastern Armstrong County. It was named after Plum Creek, which is a tributary of Crooked Creek andis also part of the Allegheny River watershed.

The township surrounds the borough of Elderton.

According to the United States Census Bureau, the township has a total area of 43.1 square miles (111.5 km^{2}), of which 42.4 square miles (109.8 km^{2}) is land and 0.66 square miles (1.7 km^{2}), or 1.55%, is water.

== Demographics ==
Historical population
Census	Pop.	Note	%±
2010	2,375		—
2020	2,106		−11.3%
2021 (est.)	2,091		−0.7%
U.S. Decennial Census

As of the 2000 census, there were 2,304 people, 877 households, and 678 families residing in the township.

The population density was 54.5 inhabitants per square mile (21.0/km^{2}). There were 935 housing units at an average density of 22.1/sq mi (8.5/km^{2}).

The racial makeup of the township was 99.44% White, 0.09% African American, 0.09% Native American, 0.13% from other races, and 0.26% from two or more races. Hispanic or Latino of any race were 0.22% of the population.

There were 877 households, out of which 30.6% had children under the age of eighteen living with them; 66.8% were married couples living together, 6.7% had a female householder with no husband present, and 22.6% were non-families. 18.8% of all households were made up of individuals, and 7.9% had someone living alone who was sixty-five years of age or older.

The average household size was 2.53 and the average family size was 2.88.

The township median age of forty-one years was slightly more than the county median age of forty years. The distribution by age group was 22.0% of residents who were under the age of eighteen, 6.2% who were aged eighteen to twenty-four, 28.3% who were aged twenty-five to forty-four, 27.4% who were aged forty-five to sixty-four, and 16.1% who were sixty-five years of age or older.

For every one hundred females, there were 102.1 males. For every one hundred females who were aged eighteen or older, there were 100.4 males.

The median income for a household in the township was $34,744, and the median income for a family was $39,559. Males had a median income of $28,802 compared with that of $19,095 for females.

The per capita income for the township was $14,624.

Approximately 8.2% of families and 11.9% of the population were living below the poverty line, including 17.6% of those who were under the age of eighteen and 14.0% of those who were aged sixty-five or older.
