= Shelocta, Pennsylvania =

Borough in Pennsylvania, US

- Borough
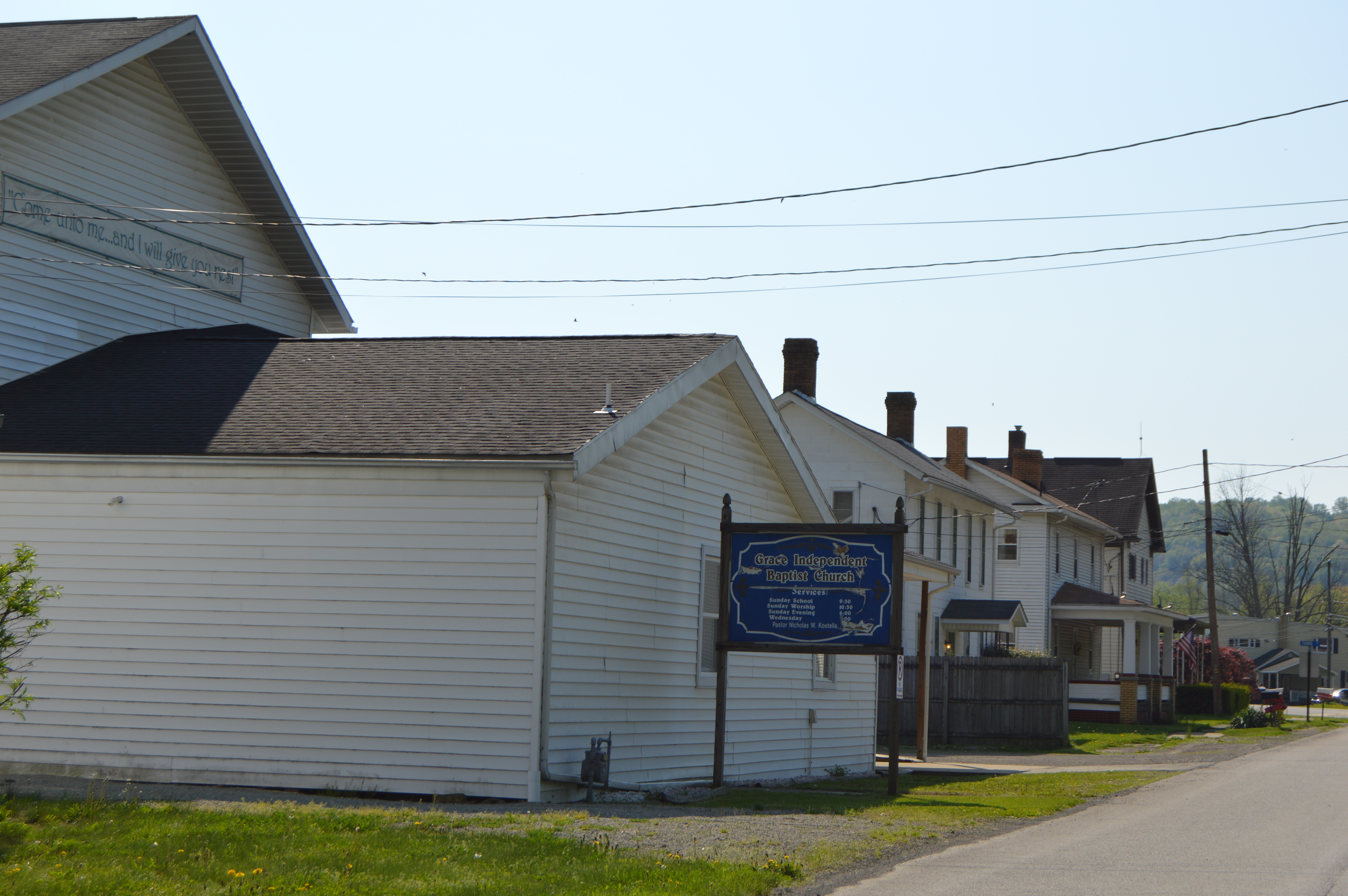
- Main Street, with Grace Independent Baptist Church in the foreground

- Location of Shelocta in Indiana County, Pennsylvania.

- Location within Pennsylvania Location within the United States
- Coordinates: 40°39′20″N 79°18′07″W
- Country: United States
- State: Pennsylvania
- County: Indiana

Government
  - Type: Borough Council

Area
  - Total: 0.10 sq mi (0.27 km^{2})
  - Land: 0.10 sq mi (0.27 km^{2})
  - Water: 0 sq mi (0.00 km^{2})

Population (2020)
  - Total: 102
  - Density: 980.5/sq mi (378.56/km^{2})
- Time zone: UTC-5 (Eastern (EST))
  - Summer (DST): UTC-4 (EDT)
- Zip code: 15774
- FIPS code: 42-70040

Shelocta is a borough in Indiana County, Pennsylvania, United States. The population was 102 at the 2020 census. The Keystone Generating Station is located to the west of the borough, in Plumcreek Township. The current mayor is Tessa Rinehart, who is following in the footsteps of her late grandmother, Carol Rinehart. Carol Rinehart maintained the position for 20 years.

== Geography ==
Shelocta Borough is located at 40°39′20″N 79°18′7″W (40.655657, -79.301901).

According to the United States Census Bureau, the borough has a total area of 0.1 square miles (0.26 km^{2}), all land.

US Route 422 passes through Shelocta.

== History ==
Shelocta Borough began as Sharp's Mills in 1822, when Thomas and Joseph Sharp erected a house, saw mill, and gristmill near the center of the modern village.

Abner Kelly laid out the village lots and first offered them for sale on May 20, 1835. The name Shelocta is from the Iroquois language, meaning "Shainee Cabin." The Shelocta Post Office began operations on November 1, 1837, under postmaster Daniel Metzker.

== Natural Resources ==
Shelocta is in an area of Pennsylvania known for its coal and natural gas reserves, and is neighbored by many old company mining towns.

== Demographics ==
Historical population
Census	Pop.	Note	%±
1860	137		—
1870	113		−17.5%
1880	121		7.1%
1890	82		−32.2%
1900	92		12.2%
1910	117		27.2%
1920	124		6.0%
1930	135		8.9%
1940	114		−15.6%
1950	105		−7.9%
1960	89		−15.2%
1970	121		36.0%
1980	139		14.9%
1990	108		−22.3%
2000	127		17.6%
2010	130		2.4%
2020	102		−21.5%
2021 (est.)	102	Steady	0.0%
U.S. Decennial Census

As of the census of 2000, there were 127 people, 53 households, and 35 families residing in the borough. The population density was 1,231.5 inhabitants per square mile (475.5/km^{2}). There were 55 housing units at an average density of 533.3 per square mile (205.9/km^{2}). The racial makeup of the borough was 96.85% White, 2.36% African American, and 0.79% from two or more races.

There were 53 households, out of which 26.4% had children under the age of 18 living with them, 54.7% were married couples living together, 11.3% had a female householder with no husband present, and 32.1% were non-families. 32.1% of all households were made up of individuals, and 11.3% had someone living alone who was 65 years of age or older. The average household size was 2.40 and the average family size was 2.97.

In the borough the population was spread out, with 26.0% under the age of 18, 5.5% from 18 to 24, 28.3% from 25 to 44, 22.8% from 45 to 64, and 17.3% who were 65 years of age or older. The median age was 40 years. For every 100 females there were 89.6 males. For every 100 females age 18 and over, there were 84.3 males.

The median income for a household in the borough was $44,167, and the median income for a family was $45,833. Males had a median income of $25,000 versus $17,292 for females. The per capita income for the borough was $16,763. There were no families and 1.6% of the population living below the poverty line, including no under eighteens and none of those over 64.

== See also ==
- Shelocta, the Creek Indian chief
