= Covode, Pennsylvania =

Unincorporated community in Pennsylvania, US

- Unincorporated community
- Location within Pennsylvania Location within the United States
- Coordinates: 40°52′51″N 79°00′56″W
- Country: United States
- State: Pennsylvania
- County: Indiana
- Elevation: 1,539 ft (469 m)
- Time zone: UTC-5 (Eastern (EST))
  - Summer (DST): UTC-4 (EDT)
- Area code: 724
- GNIS feature ID: 1172541

Covode is an unincorporated community in Indiana County, Pennsylvania, United States.
