= Maysville, Armstrong County, Pennsylvania =

Unincorporated community in Pennsylvania, US

Maysville
- Unincorporated community
- Location within the state of Pennsylvania Maysville (the United States)
- Coordinates: 40°33′47″N 79°27′2″W
- Country: United States
- State: Pennsylvania
- County: Armstrong
- Township: Kiskiminetas
- Elevation: 978 ft (298 m)
- Time zone: UTC-5 (Eastern (EST))
  - Summer (DST): UTC-4 (EDT)
- GNIS feature ID: 1180585

Maysville is an unincorporated community located within Kiskiminetas Township, Armstrong County, Pennsylvania, United States.
