= South Bend Township, Pennsylvania =

Township in Pennsylvania, US

Coordinates: 40°37′00″N 79°22′59″W

- Township
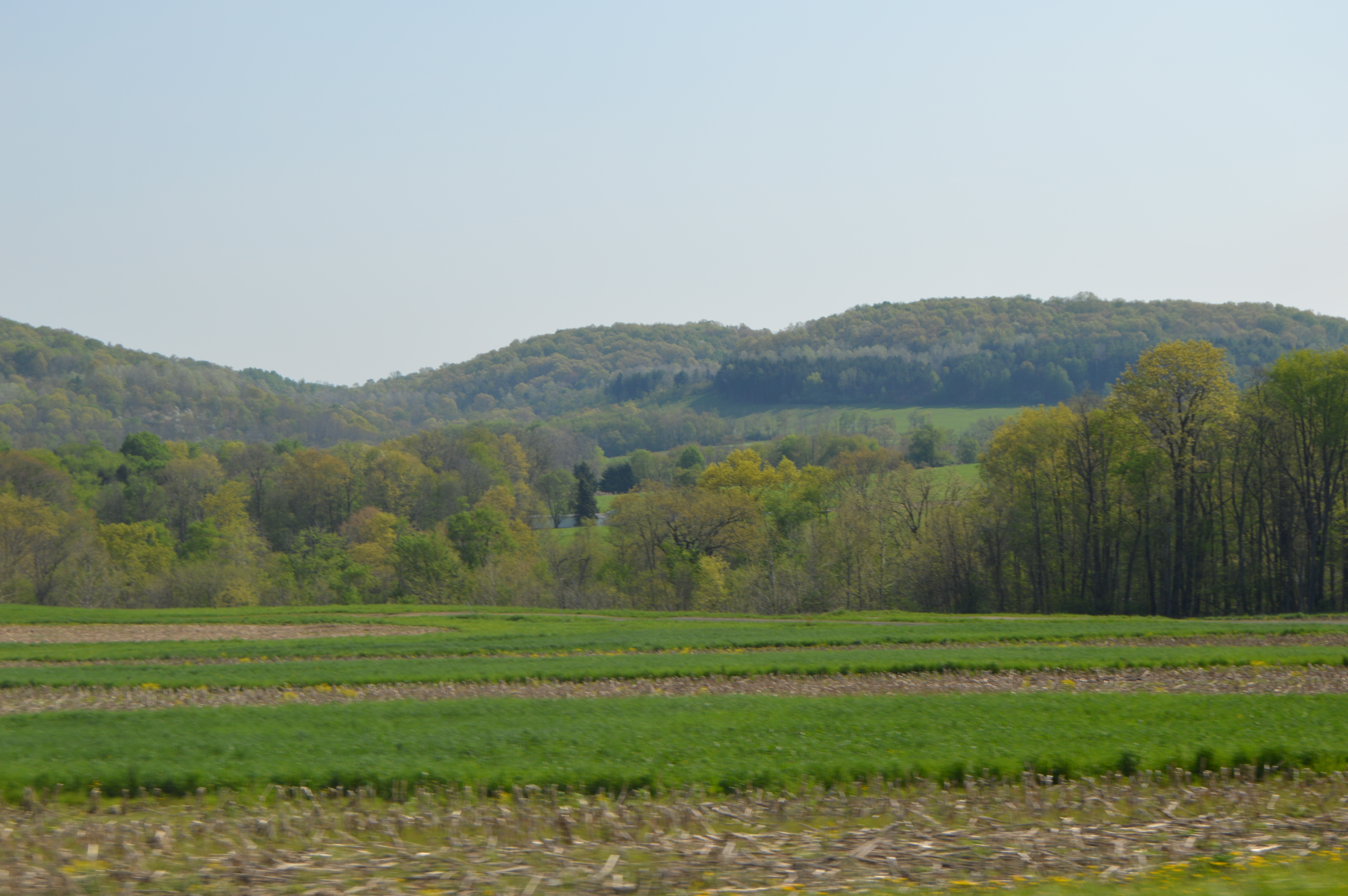
- Fields and hills along Pennsylvania Route 56

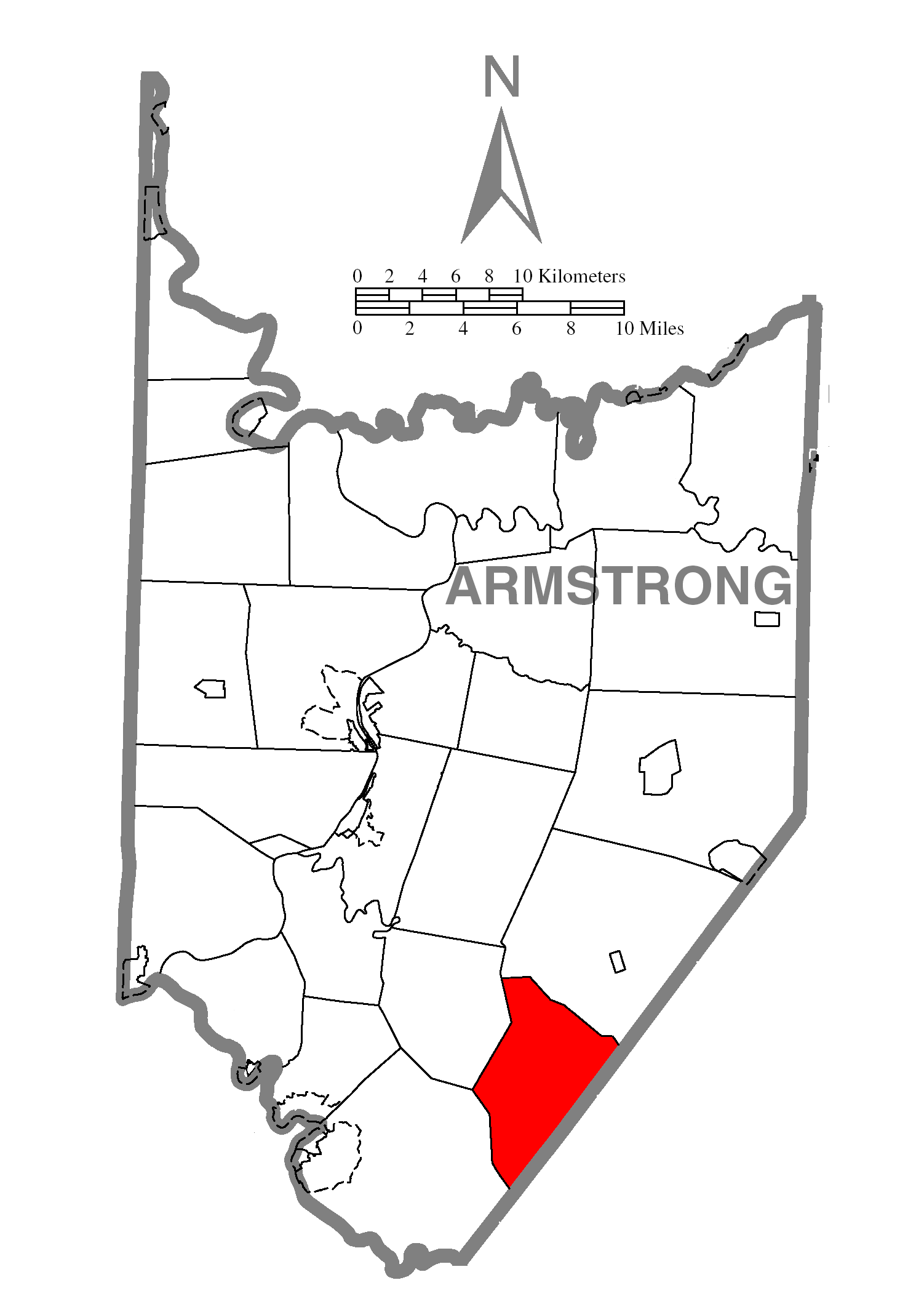
- Map of Armstrong County, Pennsylvania, highlighting South Bend Township

- Map of Armstrong County, Pennsylvania
- Country: United States
- State: Pennsylvania
- County: Armstrong
- Settled: 1773
- Incorporated: 1867

Area
  - Total: 22.61 sq mi (58.55 km^{2})
  - Land: 22.53 sq mi (58.36 km^{2})
  - Water: 0.069 sq mi (0.18 km^{2})

Population (2020)
  - Total: 1,010
  - Estimate (2021): 1,000
  - Density: 50.1/sq mi (19.36/km^{2})
- Time zone: UTC-5 (Eastern (EST))
  - Summer (DST): UTC-4 (EDT)
- FIPS code: 42-005-71968

South Bend Township is a township in Armstrong County, Pennsylvania, United States. The population was 1,010 at the 2020 census, a decrease from the figure of 1,167 tabulated in 2010.

== Community ==
- Girty

== Geography ==
South Bend Township is located in southeastern Armstrong County, along the border with Indiana County. It includes the small unincorporated community of South Bend, located within a bend of Crooked Creek, which flows westward through the township towards the Allegheny River.

According to the United States Census Bureau, the township has a total area of 22.6 square miles (58.5 km^{2}), of which 22.5 square miles (58.4 km^{2}) is land and 0.077 square miles (0.2 km^{2}), or 0.31%, is water.

== Demographics ==
Historical population
Census	Pop.	Note	%±
2010	1,167		—
2020	1,010		−13.5%
2021 (est.)	1,000		−1.0%
U.S. Decennial Census

As of the 2000 census, there were 1,260 people, 468 households, and 374 families residing in the township. The population density was 55.6 inhabitants per square mile (21.5/km^{2}). There were 523 housing units at an average density of 23.1/sq mi (8.9/km^{2}). The racial makeup of the township was 99.68% White, 0.08% African American, 0.08% Native American, and 0.16% from two or more races.

There were 468 households, out of which 32.9% had children under the age of 18 living with them, 67.9% were married couples living together, 7.5% had a female householder with no husband present, and 19.9% were non-families. 17.9% of all households were made up of individuals, and 6.4% had someone living alone who was 65 years of age or older. The average household size was 2.68 and the average family size was 3.02.

The township median age of 37 years was significantly less than the county median age of 40 years. The distribution by age group was 24.3% under the age of 18, 8.8% from 18 to 24, 30.2% from 25 to 44, 26.9% from 45 to 64, and 9.8% who were 65 years of age or older. The median age was 37 years. For every 100 females there were 94.6 males. For every 100 females age 18 and over, there were 99.4 males.

The median income for a household in the township was $32,188, and the median income for a family was $34,519. Males had a median income of $30,396 versus $19,659 for females. The per capita income for the township was $14,728. About 10.2% of families and 13.4% of the population were below the poverty line, including 22.9% of those under age 18 and 1.6% of those age 65 or over.

== History ==
South Bend Township appears in the 1876 Atlas of Armstrong County, Pennsylvania. Its early history is detailed in Robert Walter Smith's 1883 History of Armstrong County.

== Cemeteries ==
- Montgomery Family Cemetery
- Olivet Cemetery
- Rupert Cemetery
- South Bend Cemetery
