= South Mahoning Township, Pennsylvania =

Township in Pennsylvania, US

Coordinates: 40°47′00″N 79°07′00″W

- Township
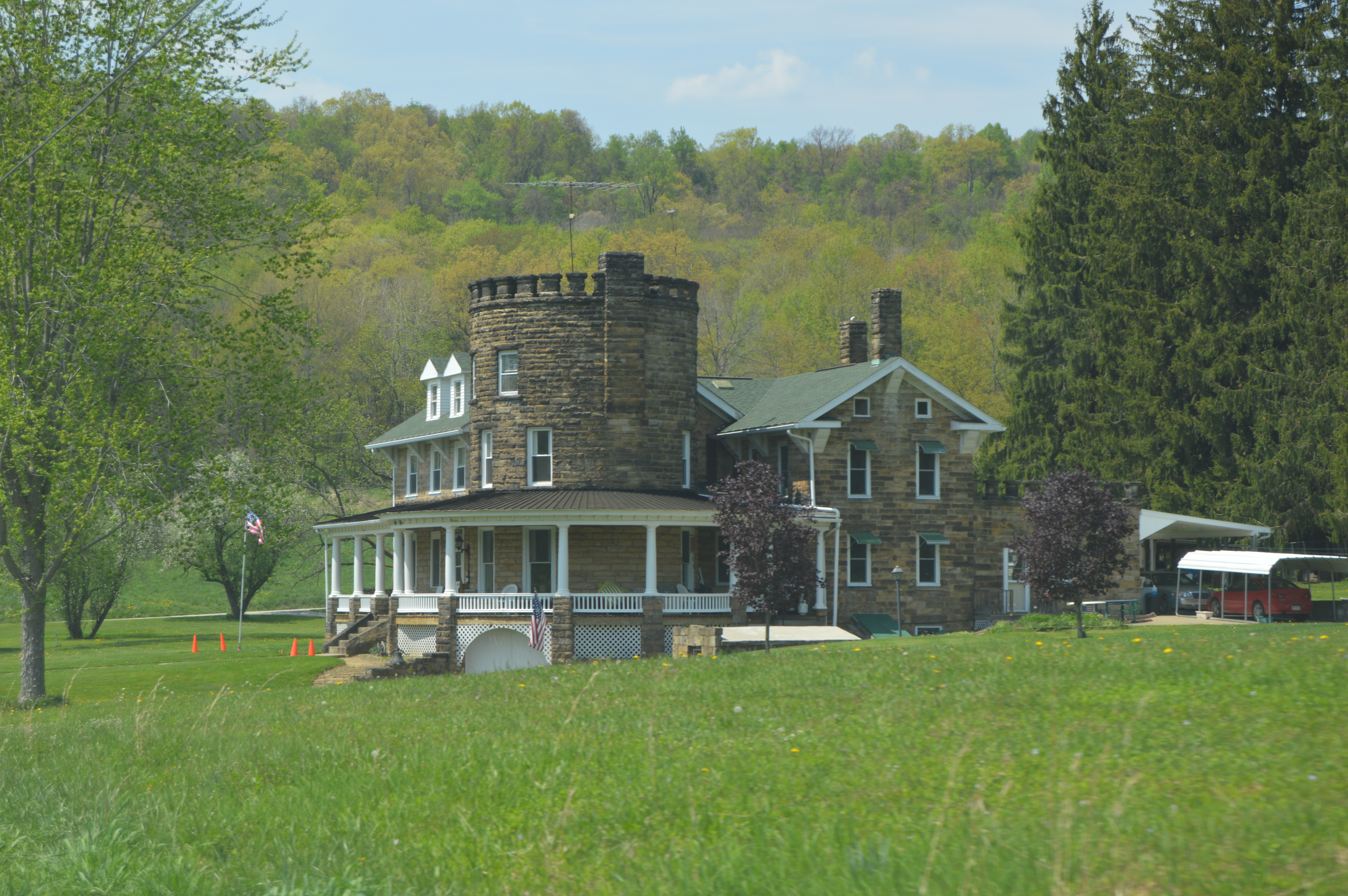
- John B. McCormick House

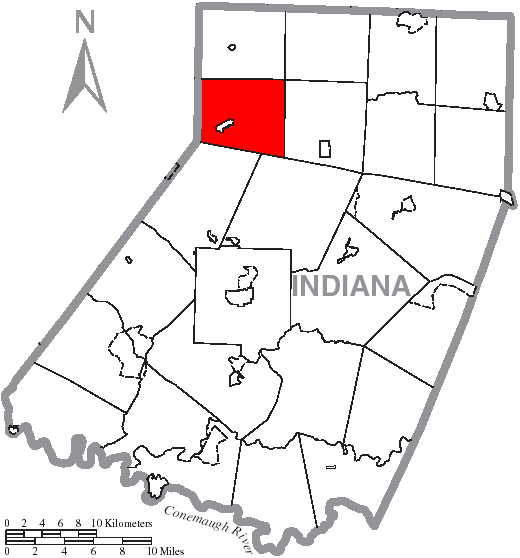
- Map of Indiana County, Pennsylvania Highlighting South Mahoning Township

- Map of Pennsylvania highlighting Indiana County
- Country: United States
- State: Pennsylvania
- County: Indiana

Area
  - Total: 28.60 sq mi (74.07 km^{2})
  - Land: 28.55 sq mi (73.95 km^{2})
  - Water: 0.046 sq mi (0.12 km^{2})

Population (2020)
  - Total: 1,841
  - Estimate (2021): 1,835
  - Density: 61.4/sq mi (23.72/km^{2})
- Time zone: UTC-5 (Eastern (EST))
  - Summer (DST): UTC-4 (EDT)
- FIPS code: 42-063-72304

South Mahoning Township is a township that is located in Indiana County, Pennsylvania, United States. The population was 1,841 at the time of the 2020 census. Historic communities in the township include Ambrose, Denton, Elkin, Frantz, McCormick, Rossmoyne and Wells.

The township surrounds Plumville, a separately incorporated borough.

== History ==
The John B. McCormick House was listed on the National Register of Historic Places in 1974.

== Geography ==
According to the United States Census Bureau, the township has a total area of 28.6 square miles (74.0 km^{2}), all land.

=== Streams ===
The Cowanshannock Creek rises in South Mahoning Township.

== Demographics ==
Historical population
Census	Pop.	Note	%±
1850	1,138		—
1860	1,167		2.5%
1870	1,131		−3.1%
1880	1,369		21.0%
1890	1,331		−2.8%
1900	1,266		−4.9%
1910	1,273		0.6%
1920	1,354		6.4%
1930	1,101		−18.7%
1940	1,189		8.0%
1950	1,089		−8.4%
1960	971		−10.8%
1970	1,128		16.2%
1980	1,608		42.6%
1990	1,713		6.5%
2000	1,852		8.1%
2010	1,841		−0.6%
2020	1,841		0.0%
2021 (est.)	1,835		−0.3%
U.S. Decennial Census

At the time of the 2000 census, there were 1,852 people, 616 households and 481 families residing in the township.

The population density was 64.8 inhabitants per square mile (25.0/km^{2}) There were 677 housing units at an average density of 23.7/sq mi (9.1/km^{2}).

The racial makeup of the township was 99.51% White, 0.05% African American, 0.05% Native American, 0.22% Pacific Islander, 0.05% from other races, and 0.11% from two or more races.

There were 616 households, of which 38.3% had children who were under the age of eighteen living with them; 69.5% were married couples living together, 4.9% had a female householder with no husband present, and 21.9% were non-families. 18.8% of all households were made up of individuals, and 8.3% had someone living alone who was sixty-five years of age or older.

The average household size was 3.01 and the average family size was 3.49.

32.7% of residents were under the age of eighteen, 7.6% were aged eighteen to twenty-four, 28.0% were aged twenty-five to forty-four, 20.2% were aged forty-five to sixty-four, and 11.6% were sixty-five years of age or older. The median age was thirty-three years.

For every one hundred females, there were 103.7 males. For every one hundred females who were aged eighteen or older, there were 101.8 males.

The median household income was $32,308 and the median family income was $34,556. Males had a median income of $28,688 compared with that of $20,375 earned by females.

The per capita income was $13,191.

Approximately 13.9% of families and 22.5% of the population were living below the poverty line, including 37.1% of those who were under the age of eighteen and 17.7% of those who were aged sixty-five or older.
