= Ernest, Pennsylvania =

Borough in Pennsylvania, US

- Borough
- Location of Ernest in Indiana County, Pennsylvania.

- Location within Pennsylvania Location within the United States
- Coordinates: 40°40′39″N 79°09′51″W
- Country: United States
- State: Pennsylvania
- County: Indiana

Government
  - Type: Borough Council

Area
  - Total: 0.24 sq mi (0.61 km^{2})
  - Land: 0.23 sq mi (0.59 km^{2})
  - Water: 0.0077 sq mi (0.02 km^{2})

Population (2020)
  - Total: 417
  - Density: 1,815.5/sq mi (700.98/km^{2})
- Time zone: UTC-5 (Eastern (EST))
  - Summer (DST): UTC-4 (EDT)
- Zip code: 15739
- FIPS code: 42-24040

Ernest is a borough in Indiana County, Pennsylvania, United States. The population was 422 at the 2020 census.

== History ==
A post office called Ernest was established in 1903 and remained in operation until 1973. Ernest was the first coal town founded by the Rochester & Pittsburgh Coal Co. in Indiana County. When Adrian Iselin, the chief stockholder in the Rochester & Pittsburgh Coal & Iron Company, finished inspecting the new mine, he officially changed the name from McKees Mills to Ernest, in honor of his son, who was born in 1876.

== Geography ==
Ernest is located at 40°40′39″N 79°09′51″W.

According to the United States Census Bureau, the borough has a total area of 0.2 square miles (0.52 km^{2}), all land.

== Demographics ==
Historical population
Census	Pop.	Note	%±
1980	584		—
1990	492		−15.8%
2000	501		1.8%
2010	462		−7.8%
2020	417		−9.7%
2021 (est.)	420	▲	0.7%

As of the 2000 census, there were 501 people, 208 households, and 122 families residing in the borough. The population density was 2,134.6 inhabitants per square mile (824.2/km^{2}). There were 221 housing units at an average density of 941.6 per square mile (363.6/km^{2}). The racial makeup of the borough was 97.41% White, 1.00% African American, 0.40% Native American, 0.20% Asian, 0.40% from other races, and 0.60% from two or more races. Hispanics or Latinos of any race were 0.80% of the population.

There were 208 households, of which 30.8% had children under 18 living with them, 43.3% were married couples living together, 10.6% had a female householder with no husband present, and 41.3% were non-families. 35.1% of all households comprised individuals, and 23.6% had someone 65 years or older living alone. The average household size was 2.41, and the average family size was 3.18.

The borough's population was spread out, with 26.9% under the age of 18, 8.4% from 18 to 24, 28.1% from 25 to 44, 19.6% from 45 to 64, and 17.0% who were 65 years or older. The median age was 36. For every 100 females, there were 91.2 males. For every 100 females age 18 and over, there were 87.7 males.

The median income for a household in the borough was $21,058, and the median income for a family was $28,214. Males had a median income of $23,438 versus $17,125 for females. The per capita income for the borough was $10,951. About 16.7% of families and 19.8% of the population were below the poverty line, including 31.5% of those under age 18 and 15.9% of those age 65 or over.

== Notable person ==
- Bernice Gera, the first female umpire in a professional baseball game
