= Home, Pennsylvania =

Unincorporated community in Pennsylvania, US

- Unincorporated village
- Location within Pennsylvania Location within the United States
- Coordinates: 40°44′22″N 79°6′22″W
- Country: United States
- State: Pennsylvania
- County: Indiana
- Township: Rayne
- Time zone: UTC-5 (Eastern (EST))
  - Summer (DST): UTC-4 (EDT)
- ZIP code: 15747

Home is an unincorporated village located in Rayne Township, Indiana County, Pennsylvania, United States. Perhaps best known for appearing in The X-Files episode of the same name, Home has the ZIP code 15747 and is located in telephone area code 724.

== History ==
The community received its name because its first post office was located in the "home" of postmaster Hugh Cannon in 1834, though people often referred to it by its original name, Kellysburg.

== See also ==
- "Home", an episode of The X-Files set in Home
- The 1977 novel Song of Solomon by Toni Morrison, partially set in Home
