= Trade City, Pennsylvania =

Unincorporated community in Pennsylvania, US

- Unincorporated community
- Location within Pennsylvania Location within the United States
- Coordinates: 40°52′43″N 79°04′28″W
- Country: United States
- State: Pennsylvania
- County: Indiana
- Elevation: 1,489 ft (454 m)
- Time zone: UTC-5 (Eastern (EST))
  - Summer (DST): UTC-4 (EDT)
- Area code: 724
- GNIS feature ID: 1189708

Trade City (also Davidsville) is an unincorporated community in Indiana County, Pennsylvania, United States.

== History ==
=== Notoriety ===
On June 3, 2012, Richard Shotts was murdered in North Mahoning Township near Trade City. Shaun Fairman was convicted in 2013 of the murder, and his appeal to the Pennsylvania Supreme Court in 2019 was rejected.
