= Plumville, Pennsylvania =

Borough in Pennsylvania, US

- Borough
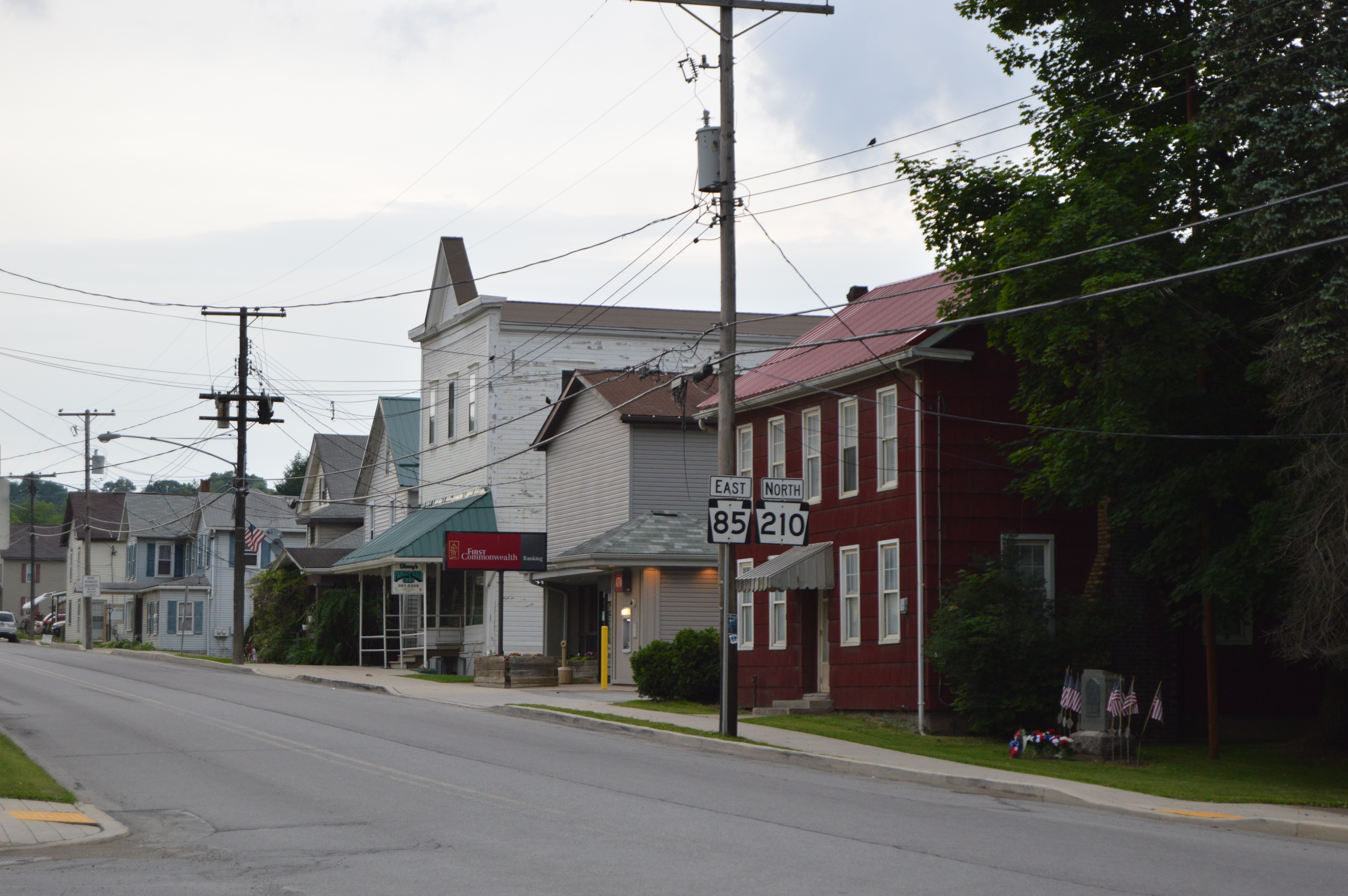
- Main Street

- Location of Plumville in Indiana County, Pennsylvania.

- Location within Pennsylvania Location within the United States
- Coordinates: 40°47′38″N 79°10′49″W
- Country: United States
- State: Pennsylvania
- County: Indiana

Government
  - Type: Borough Council

Area
  - Total: 0.49 sq mi (1.28 km^{2})
  - Land: 0.49 sq mi (1.28 km^{2})
  - Water: 0 sq mi (0.00 km^{2})

Population (2020)
  - Total: 255
  - Density: 514.5/sq mi (198.64/km^{2})
- Time zone: UTC-5 (Eastern (EST))
  - Summer (DST): UTC-4 (EDT)
- Zip code: 16246
- FIPS code: 42-61632

Plumville is a borough in Indiana County, Pennsylvania, United States. The population was 257 at the 2020 census.

== Etymology ==
The borough was originally named for the presence of wild plum trees.

== Geography ==
Plumville is located at 40°47′38″N 79°10′49″W (40.793823, -79.180235).

According to the United States Census Bureau, the borough has a total area of 0.5 square miles (1.3 km^{2}), all land. The north branch of Plum Creek passes through Plumville; it is spanned by a bridge constructed in 1918.

== History ==
A local historical marker states that Plumville was founded in 1818. An 1856 land ownership map depicted it as a small community within South Mahoning township. Telephone service arrived around 1890. Plumville was incorporated as a borough in December 1909. The 1910 census recorded its population as 414.

The Consolidated Coal and Coke Company's Plumville mine was located in the area west of Redding Run Road. The Pennsylvania Department of Environmental Protection has identified undermined areas within and adjacent to the borough.

== Demographics ==
Historical population
Census	Pop.	Note	%±
1880	191		—
1910	414		—
1920	538		30.0%
1930	518		−3.7%
1940	469		−9.5%
1950	452		−3.6%
1960	401		−11.3%
1970	429		7.0%
1980	431		0.5%
1990	390		−9.5%
2000	342		−12.3%
2010	307		−10.2%
2020	255		−16.9%
2021 (est.)	256	▲	0.4%

As of the census of 2000, there were 342 people, 123 households, and 92 families residing in the borough. The population density was 673.3 inhabitants per square mile (260.0/km^{2}). There were 145 housing units at an average density of 285.4 per square mile (110.2/km^{2}). The racial makeup of the borough was 98.54% White, 0.29% Native American, and 1.17% from two or more races.

There were 123 households, out of which 34.1% had children under the age of 18 living with them, 62.6% were married couples living together, 7.3% had a female householder with no husband present, and 24.4% were non-families. 22.0% of all households were made up of individuals, and 9.8% had someone living alone who was 65 years of age or older. The average household size was 2.78 and the average family size was 3.23.

In the borough the population was spread out, with 28.9% under the age of 18, 8.5% from 18 to 24, 28.7% from 25 to 44, 21.6% from 45 to 64, and 12.3% who were 65 years of age or older. The median age was 33 years. For every 100 females there were 100.0 males. For every 100 females age 18 and over, there were 100.8 males.

The median income for a household in the borough was $26,964, and the median income for a family was $28,125. Males had a median income of $24,792 versus $20,625 for females. The per capita income for the borough was $14,540. About 22.7% of families and 29.5% of the population were below the poverty line, including 44.9% of those under age 18 and 25.6% of those age 65 or over.
