= Elderton, Pennsylvania =

Borough in Pennsylvania, US

- Borough
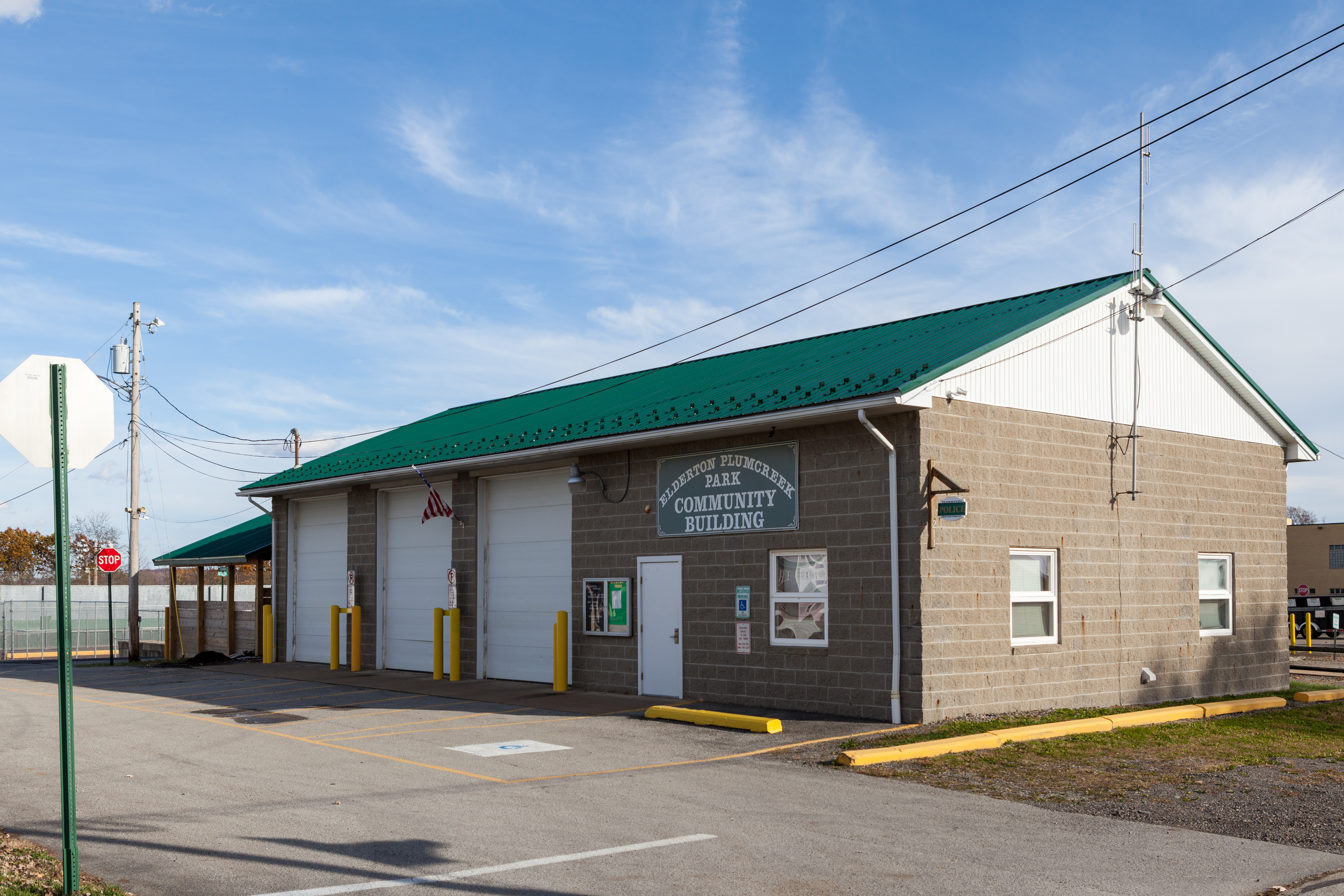
- Community Building 211 South Lytle Street

- Location of Elderton in Armstrong County, Pennsylvania.

- Location within Pennsylvania
- Coordinates: 40°41′42″N 79°20′36″W
- Country: United States
- State: Pennsylvania
- County: Armstrong
- Settled: 1822
- Incorporated: 1859

Government
  - Type: Borough Council

Area
  - Total: 0.32 sq mi (0.84 km^{2})
  - Land: 0.32 sq mi (0.84 km^{2})
  - Water: 0 sq mi (0.00 km^{2})
- Elevation: 1,264 ft (385 m)

Population (2020)
  - Total: 334
  - Density: 1,033.7/sq mi (399.13/km^{2})
- Time zone: UTC-5 (Eastern (EST))
  - Summer (DST): UTC-4 (EDT)
- Zip code: 15736
- Area codes: 724, 878
- FIPS code: 42-22832

Elderton is a borough in Armstrong County, Pennsylvania, United States. The population was 334 at the 2020 census.

== Geography ==
Elderton is located at 40°41′42″N 79°20′36″W in eastern Armstrong County. U.S. Route 422 leads northwest 13 miles (21 km) to Kittanning and southeast 12 miles (19 km) to the borough of Indiana.

According to the United States Census Bureau, Elderton has a total area of 0.31 square miles (0.8 km^{2}), all land.

== Demographics ==
Historical population
Census	Pop.	Note	%±
1860	196		—
1870	235		19.9%
1880	299		27.2%
1890	243		−18.7%
1900	293		20.6%
1910	285		−2.7%
1920	261		−8.4%
1930	311		19.2%
1940	354		13.8%
1950	336		−5.1%
1960	387		15.2%
1970	428		10.6%
1980	420		−1.9%
1990	371		−11.7%
2000	358		−3.5%
2010	356		−0.6%
2020	334		−6.2%

As of the 2000 census, there were 358 people, 145 households, and 107 families residing in the borough. The population density was 1,293.0 inhabitants per square mile (499.2/km^{2}). There were 156 housing units at an average density of 563.4 per square mile (217.5/km^{2}). The racial makeup of the borough was 99.44% White, 0.28% African American, and 0.28% from two or more races.

There were 145 households, out of which 30.3% had children under the age of 18 living with them, 59.3% were married couples living together, 6.9% had a female householder with no husband present, and 26.2% were non-families. 24.8% of all households were made up of individuals, and 10.3% had someone living alone who was 65 years of age or older. The average household size was 2.42 and the average family size was 2.82.

The borough median age of 40 years was the same as the county median age. The distribution by age group was 22.3% under the age of 18, 11.2% from 18 to 24, 26.0% from 25 to 44, 19.8% from 45 to 64, and 20.7% who were 65 years of age or older. The median age was 40 years. For every 100 females, there were 93.5 males. For every 100 females age 18 and over, there were 86.6 males.

The median income for a household in the borough was $36,000, and the median income for a family was $43,750. Males had a median income of $37,917 versus $23,021 for females. The per capita income for the borough was $18,805. About 3.6% of families and 5.0% of the population were below the poverty line, including 7.0% of those under age 18 and 11.0% of those age 65 or over.

== Cemeteries ==
- Elderton Cemetery
- Elderton Presbyterian Church Cemetery
- Elderton United Methodist Church Cemetery

== See also ==
- Elderton High School
