= List of crossings of the Youghiogheny River =

This is a list of bridges and other crossings of the Youghiogheny River starting from its mouth in McKeesport, Pennsylvania upstream.

== Crossings ==
Crossing	Carries	Location	Coordinates
=== Pennsylvania ===
P&LE McKeesport Bridge	CSX Keystone Subdivision	McKeesport	
Jerome Street Bridge (Lysle Bridge)	Yellow Belt; George Lysle Blvd	McKeesport	
Fifteenth Avenue Bridge	Fifteenth Avenue; Youghiogheny River Trail	McKeesport and Port Vue	
P&LE Liberty Boro Bridge	CSX Keystone Subdivision	McKeesport and Liberty	
Boston Bridge	Orange Belt; PA 48	Versailles and Elizabeth Township	
Sutersville Bridge	First Street	Sutersville and Elizabeth Township	
West Newton Bridge	PA 136	West Newton	
Smithton High-Level Bridge	I-70	South Huntingdon Township and Rostraver Township	
Smithton Low-Level Bridge	PA 981	South Huntingdon Township and Rostraver Township	
Banning Railroad Bridge	Wheeling and Lake Erie Railway	Perry Township	
Layton Bridge	Layton Road	Perry Township	40°5′21″N 79°43′49″W
Dawson Bridge	PA 819	Dawson and Dunbar Township	
P&LE West Yough Bridge	former Pittsburgh and Lake Erie Railroad line	Connellsville Township and Dunbar Township	
Connellsville P&WV Bridge	former Pittsburgh and West Virginia Railway line	Connellsville	
Memorial Bridge	US 119	Connellsville	
Crawford Avenue Bridge	PA 711	Connellsville	
Dam		South Connellsville and Dunbar Township	
Connellsville B&O Bridge	Southwest Pennsylvania Railroad	South Connellsville and Dunbar Township	
Ohiopyle High Bridge	Youghiogheny River Trail	Stewart Township	
Ohiopyle Low Bridge	Youghiogheny River Trail	Stewart Township and Ohiopyle	
Ohiopyle Highway Bridge	PA 381	Stewart Township and Ohiopyle	
Confluence Railroad Bridge	Youghiogheny River Trail	Confluence and Henry Clay Township	
Confluence Bridge	PA 281	Confluence and Henry Clay Township	
Youghiogheny River Dam		Confluence and Henry Clay Township	39°47′52″N 79°22′09″W
Great Crossings Bridge (submerged in the reservoir)		Addison Township and Henry Clay Township	39°45′24.86″N 79°23′57.63″W
Youghiogheny Reservoir Bridge	US 40	Addison Township and Henry Clay Township	39°45′15″N 79°23′53″W
=== Maryland ===
Maple Street Bridge	MD 742	Friendsville	
Interstate 68 Bridge	I-68	Friendsville	
Road bridge	MD 42	Friendsville	
Bridge	Sang Run Road	Sang Run	
Bridge	Swallow Falls Road	Swallow Falls State Park	
Bridge	West Liberty Street	Oakland	
Rail bridge	CSX Baltimore and Ohio Railroad line	Oakland	
Bridge	MD 39	Crellin	
Bridge	Private road	Charcoal Hill	
Bridge	Underwood Road	Underwood	
Bridge	Silver Knob Road	Underwood	
=== West Virginia ===
Bridge	CR 108	Brookside	
Bridge	Private road	Brookside	
Bridge	Private road	Brookside	
Bridge	US 50	Brookside	
=== Maryland ===
Bridge	Durr Road	Redhouse	
Bridge	Private road	Redhouse	
Bridge	US 219	Redhouse	
Bridge	Roth Reynolds Road	Redhouse	
Bridge	Gnegy Church Road	Garrett County	
Bridge	US 219	Garrett County	
=== West Virginia ===
Bridge	Private Road	Silver Lake	
Silver Lake Dam		Silver Lake	
Bridge	Private Road	Silver Lake	

== See also ==
- List of crossings of the Monongahela River
