= Smithton, Pennsylvania =

Borough in Pennsylvania, US

- Borough
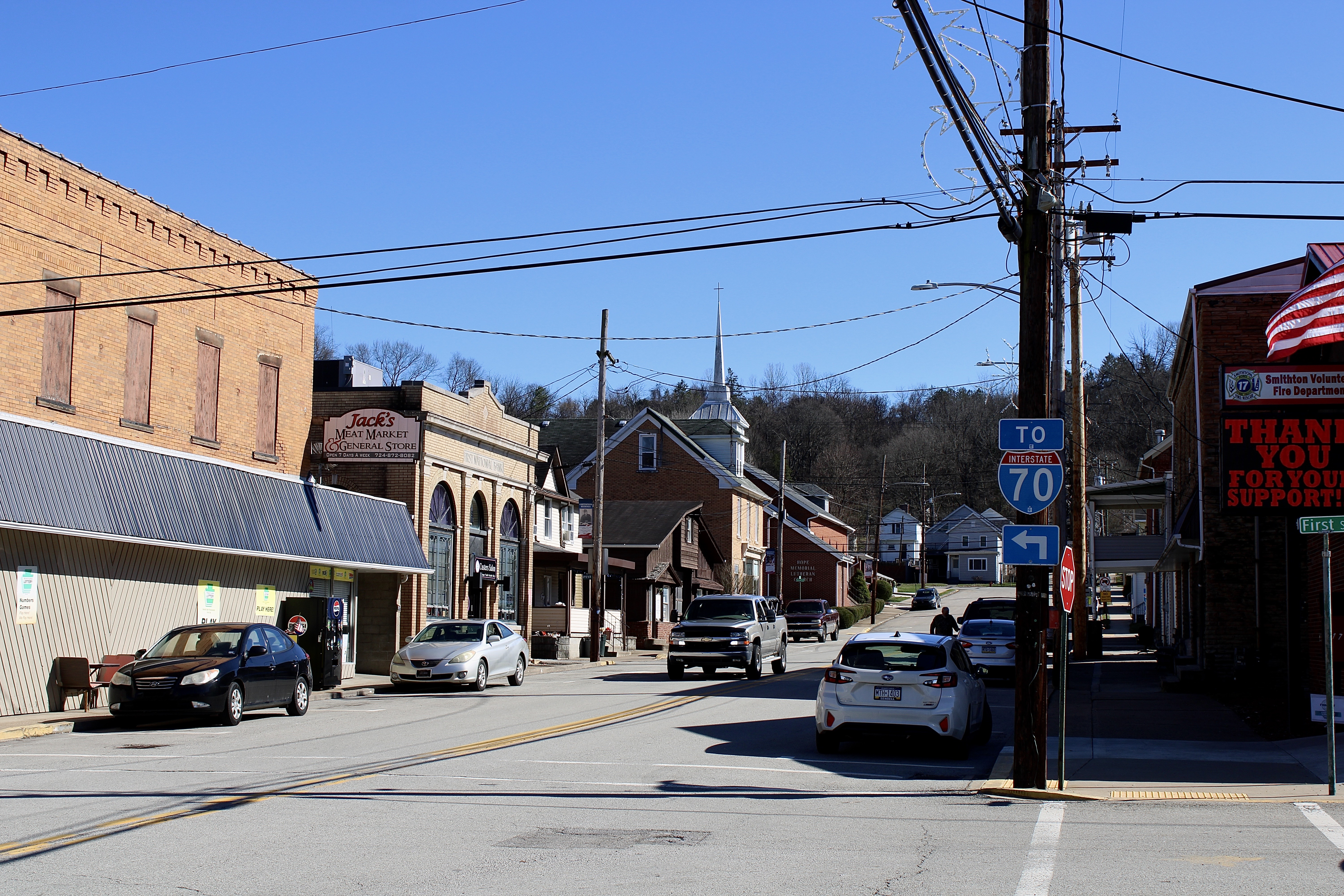
- Peer Street

- Location of Smithton in Westmoreland County, Pennsylvania.

- Location within Pennsylvania
- Coordinates: 40°09′14″N 79°44′26″W
- Country: United States
- State: Pennsylvania
- County: Westmoreland
- Incorporated: February 2, 1901

Government
  - Type: Borough Council
  - Mayor: Christine Tutena

Area
  - Total: 0.12 sq mi (0.30 km^{2})
  - Land: 0.10 sq mi (0.26 km^{2})
  - Water: 0.015 sq mi (0.04 km^{2})
- Elevation: 810 ft (250 m)

Population (2020)
  - Total: 351
  - Density: 3,434.8/sq mi (1,326.19/km^{2})
- Time zone: UTC-5 (Eastern (EST))
  - Summer (DST): UTC-4 (EDT)
- Zip code: 15479
- FIPS code: 42-71424
- Website: http://www.smithtonboro.us/

Smithton is a borough in Westmoreland County, Pennsylvania, United States. As of the 2020 census, Smithton had a population of 351. Smithton has its own post office, with zip code 15479, and is serviced by Yough School District.

== History ==
In approximately 1801, a mill, known as Smith's Mill, was built at the location which became Smithton Borough. The town was incorporated as a borough in 1901. Smithton's early industry was in coal mining, coke ovens, and the transportation of goods produced in the valley of Jacobs Creek.

By 1906, four schools were located at Smithton, with 4 teachers serving 144 students. William B. Jones (grandfather of actress Shirley Jones) founded The Jones Brewing Company at Smithton in 1907. The company brewed Stoney's Beer in Smithton until 2002, when the brewing operation was moved to Latrobe, Pennsylvania.

== Geography ==
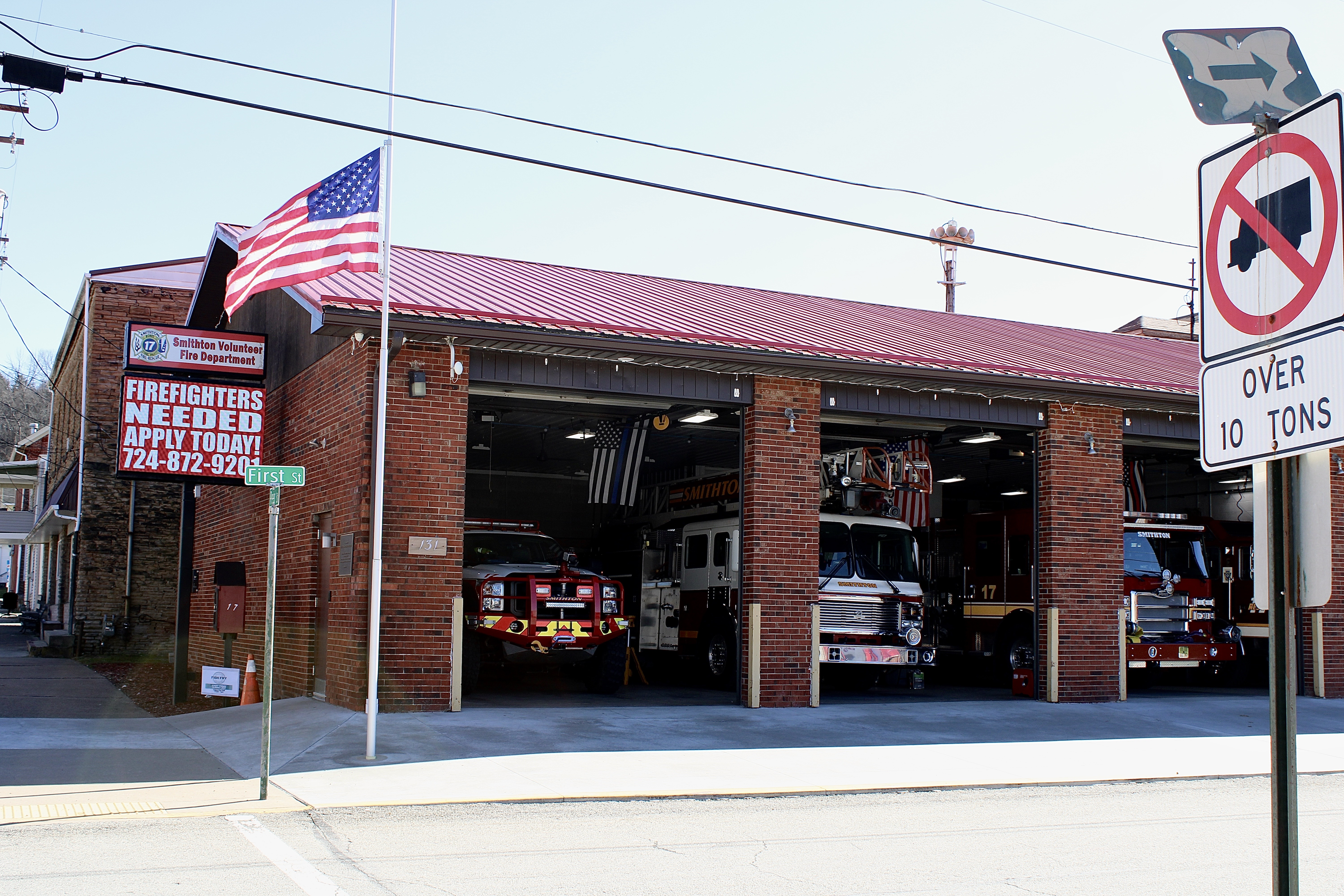
Smithton Volunteer Fire Department from First Street

Smithton is located at 40°9′14″N 79°44′26″W (40.153985, -79.740531). The Youghiogheny River runs along Smithton's western limits. According to the United States Census Bureau, the borough has a total area of 0.1 square miles (0.26 km^{2}), all land.

Smithton lies within the Laurel Highlands of the Allegheny Mountains ("the Alleghenies," colloquially). The Highlands are recognized today for their popularity among tourists, who travel from across Pennsylvania and beyond to visit the mountains, waterfalls, and recreational sites. The Great Allegheny Passage (the GAP), a 150-mile bike trail that connects Cumberland, Maryland and Pittsburgh via the Alleghenies, was built in the late 1900s and runs through the town of Smithton. A "Rails to Trails" bike path, the GAP follows the area's historically prominent railroad passages. Smithton continues to be heralded as a Western Pennsylvania "trail town" because of its geographic proximity to commercial transit (Amtrak), industrial (CSX), and now, recreational, use of these railroad passages. A bridge along Pennsylvania Route 981, referred to as the Smithton Low-Level Bridge, offers passage from the railway and bike path, on the western side of the Youghiogheny River over to Smithton, on the east side of the river.

== Surrounding neighborhoods ==
Smithton is completely surrounded by South Huntingdon Township. Tenaska Westmoreland Generating Station, a 946-megawatt power plant fueled by natural gas, is located near Smithton in South Huntington Township. Staffed by 24 employees, it became operational in 2018.

== Demographics ==
Historical population
Census	Pop.	Note	%±
1910	784		—
1920	790		0.8%
1930	709		−10.3%
1940	737		3.9%
1950	690		−6.4%
1960	649		−5.9%
1970	552		−14.9%
1980	559		1.3%
1990	388		−30.6%
2000	444		14.4%
2010	399		−10.1%
2020	351		−12.0%
U.S. Decennial Census

As of the census of 2000, there were 444 people, 188 households, and 124 families residing in the borough. The population density was 3,858.5 inhabitants per square mile (1,489.8/km^{2}). There were 208 housing units at an average density of 1,807.6 per square mile (697.9/km^{2}). The racial makeup of the borough was 99.10% White, 0.23% Native American, and 0.68% from two or more races.

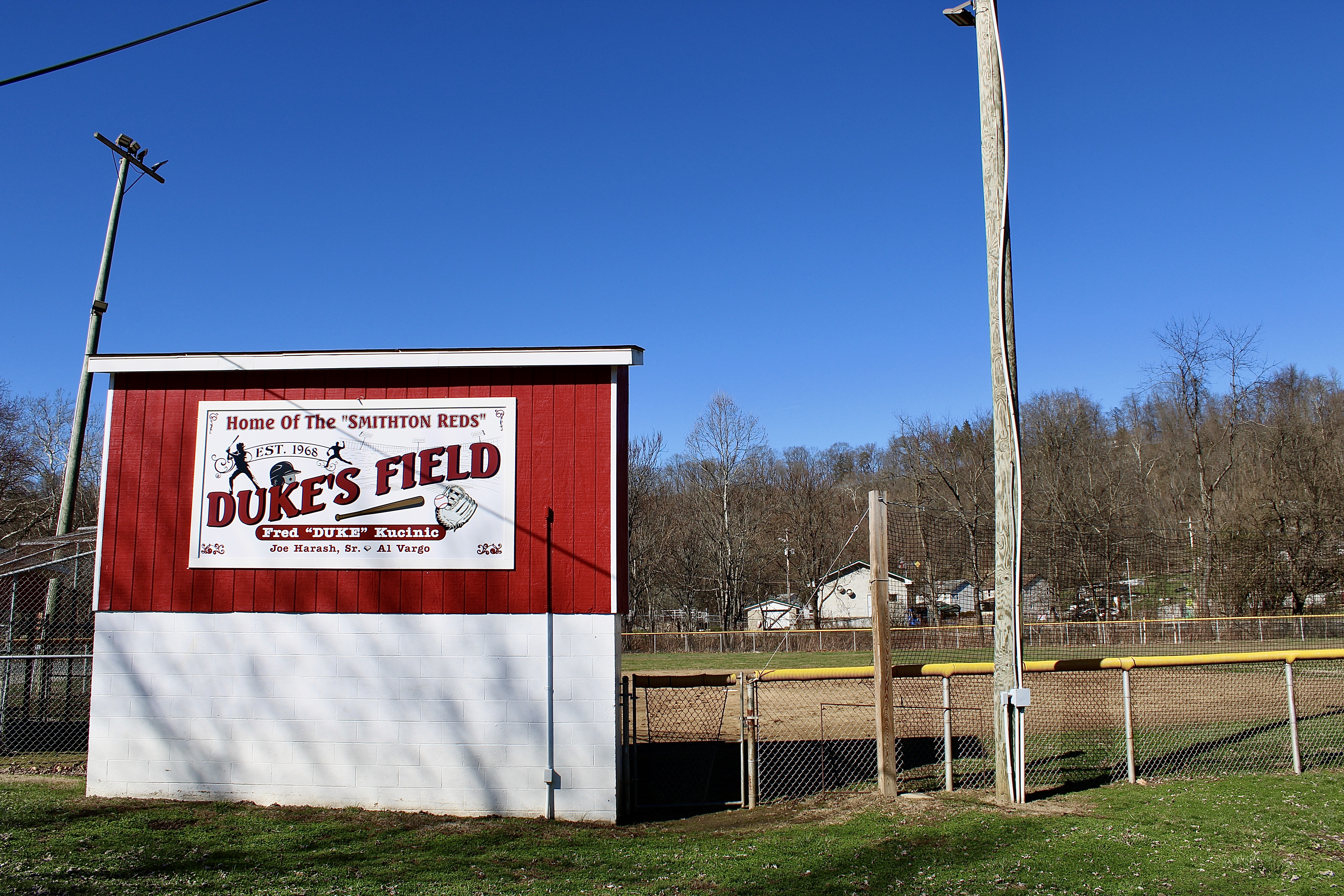
Duke Field on Lions Drive in 2026

There were 188 households, out of which 29.3% had children under the age of 18 living with them, 52.1% were married couples living together, 11.7% had a female householder with no husband present, and 34.0% were non-families. 30.9% of all households were made up of individuals, and 17.0% had someone living alone who was 65 years of age or older. The average household size was 2.36 and the average family size was 2.94.

In the borough the population was spread out, with 24.3% under the age of 18, 6.1% from 18 to 24, 26.4% from 25 to 44, 24.1% from 45 to 64, and 19.1% who were 65 years of age or older. The median age was 39 years. For every 100 females, there were 90.6 males. For every 100 females age 18 and over, there were 86.7 males.

The median income for a household in the borough was $28,854, and the median income for a family was $36,250. Males had a median income of $26,667 versus $23,056 for females. The per capita income for the borough was $16,715. About 7.1% of families and 14.6% of the population were below the poverty line, including 22.0% of those under age 18 and 7.2% of those age 65 or over.

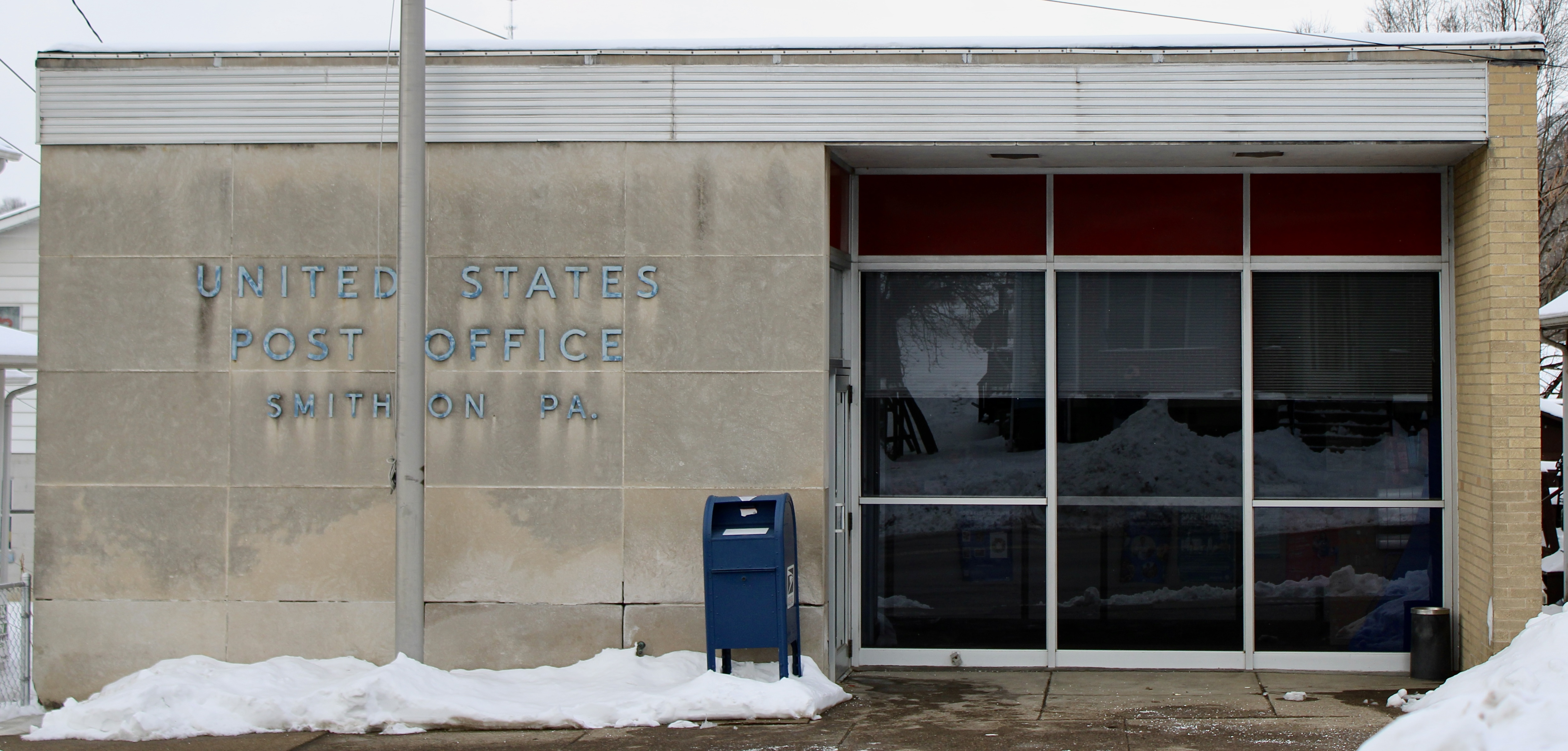
Post office on Second Street

== Government ==
Smithton has a small local government that consists of seven (currently six active) council members and a mayor. Borough meetings are held on the second Monday of each month.

The Smithton Borough Police Department has eight sworn police officers, one full-time officer and seven part-time officers, which patrol the town less than 40 hours per month in total.

== Notable people ==
- Shirley Jones, actress
- Hannah J. Patterson (1879–1937), suffragist
