= Memorial Bridge (Connellsville) =

- Coordinates: 40°01′N 79°36′W
- Carries: US 119
- Crosses: Youghiogheny River
- Locale: Connellsville, Pennsylvania

Characteristics
- Design: girder bridge
- Total length: 805 ft
- Width: 49 ft

History
- Opened: 1952

The Memorial Bridge is a structure that crosses the Youghiogheny River, connecting the eastern and western shores of Connellsville, Pennsylvania, US.

The bridge was constructed in 1952 as part of a new routing a U.S. Route 119 (US 119) on a four-lane highway around the city center. In 1982, the structure was rehabilitated as part of a decade long widening of the route through Fayette County, that included the creation of a freeway bypass in Uniontown, 12 miles (19 km) to the south. In 2009–10, the road was again reconstructed, this time to accommodate improved pedestrian pathways. The walkways were widened as part of a plan to connect the Great Allegheny Passage, the Washington, D.C. to Pittsburgh trail that runs just past the western bridge approach, to an extension of the small Coal & Coke Trail, which currently runs from Mount Pleasant to Scottdale, Pennsylvania. Receding water in 2024 exposed the original construction.

== See also ==
- List of crossings of the Youghiogheny River
