= Pennsylvania Route 286 =

State highway in Pennsylvania, US

Pennsylvania Route 286

Route information
- Maintained by PennDOT
- Length: 68.8 mi (110.7 km)
- Existed: 1961–present

Major junctions
- West end: US 22 in Monroeville
- PA 66 (via Mamont Drive) near Murrysville; US 422 near Indiana; US 119 in Indiana
- East end: US 219 near Burnside

Location
- Country: United States
- State: Pennsylvania
- Counties: Allegheny, Westmoreland, Indiana, Clearfield

Highway system
- Pennsylvania State Route System; Interstate; US; State; Scenic; Legislative
← PA 285	→ PA 287

Pennsylvania Route 286 (PA 286) is a 69-mile-long (111 km), east–west state highway located in Allegheny, Westmoreland, Indiana, and Clearfield counties in Pennsylvania.

The western terminus is at U.S. Route 22 (US 22) in Monroeville. The eastern terminus is at US 219 near Burnside.

== Route description ==
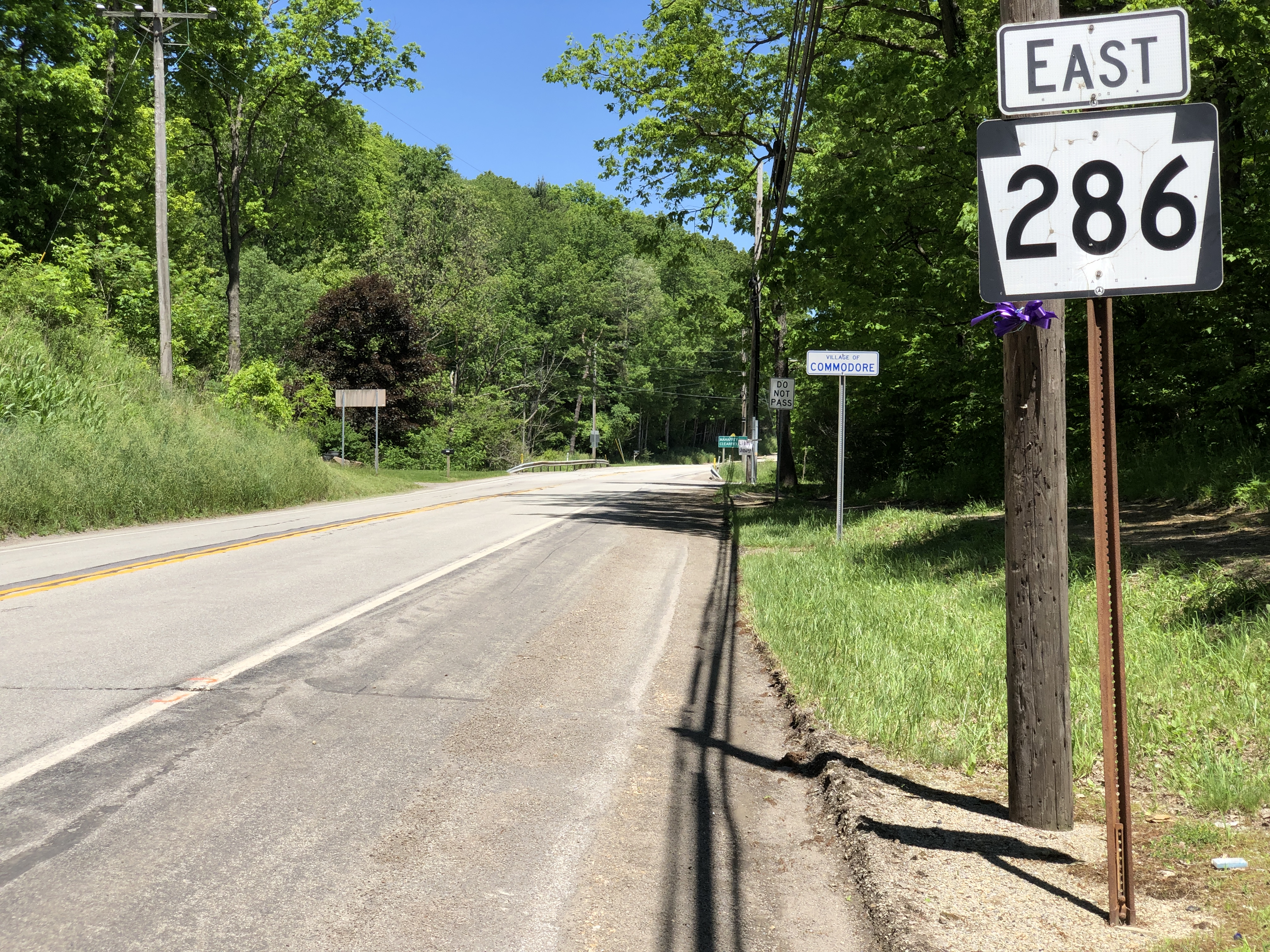
PA 286 eastbound past PA 240 in Commodore

PA 286 is designated by multiple names along its route, including the Golden Mile Highway, Saltsburg Road, Washington Street, Salt Street, Main Street, Oakland Avenue, Philadelphia Street, and Franklin Street. Although it is signed east–west, the route takes a more northeast–southwest direction, especially in Indiana and Clearfield counties.

=== Allegheny County ===
The route starts at an interchange at US 22 in a rural portion of the municipality of Monroeville and continues into Plum Borough. The route spends only a little over four miles in Allegheny County before crossing the Allegheny/Westmoreland county line.

=== Westmoreland County ===
The route continues north before turning east at the intersection of PA 380, where the two routes exchange the Golden Mile Highway and Saltsburg Road in the town of Murrysville. The route continues east in Westmoreland County, where it crosses over PA 66 in the village of Mamont (accessible by Pfeffer Road southbound or Mamont Road).

It then intersects PA 819 in Bell Township, and PA 380 in the village of Wakena, where it terminates. The route then has a short concurrency with PA 981 before crossing the Kiskiminetas River and entering the town of Saltsburg, Indiana County, after covering roughly 15.5 miles in Westmoreland County.

=== Indiana County ===
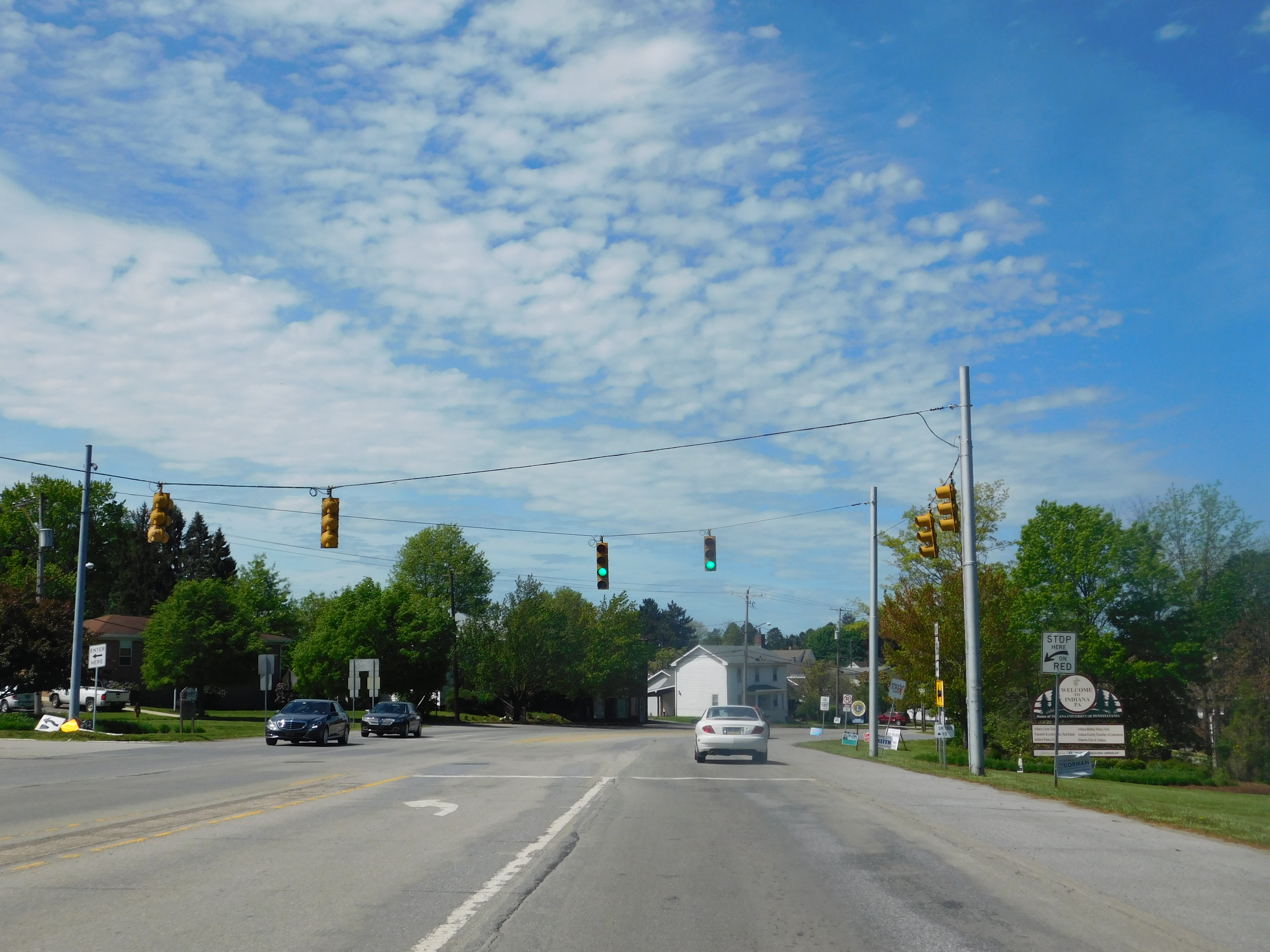
PA 286 in Indiana

The route starts going northeast after exiting the town of Saltsburg. Before entering the borough of Indiana, the route has an intersection with PA 217 outside of the village of Jacksonville, where it terminates. It also connects with an interchange with US 422/PA 56 and intersects with US 422 Business, both just outside Indiana.

The route enters the borough from the southwest, and has a short concurrency with PA 954 in downtown. After passing under US 119, the route continues northeast.

Following a short concurrency with PA 403 in Clymer, and an intersection with PA 240 in the village of Commodore, the route continues northeast, passing through Glen Campbell It then crosses the Clearfield county line after spending about 50 miles in Indiana County.

=== Clearfield County ===
The route continues northeast for a short distance before terminating at an intersection with US 219 in Burnside Township

== History ==
Some of the route before its designation in 1961 included PA 13 from Saltsburg to Indiana, and PA 80 from PA 380 to US 219 and US 22 to PA 380. Since its establishment, the route has stayed on the same roads.

== Major intersections ==
County	Location	mi	km	Destinations	Notes
Allegheny	Monroeville	0.0	0.0	US 22 (William Penn Highway) – Pittsburgh, Murrysville	Interchange; western terminus of PA 286
Westmoreland	Murrysville	4.9	7.9	PA 380 (Saltsburg Road/Fairview Drive) – Penn Hills, New Kensington	Interchange
Westmoreland	Washington Township	10.7	17.2	Mamont Drive to PA 66	
Westmoreland	Bell Township	14.2	22.9	PA 819 – Salina, Slickville	
Westmoreland	Bell Township	17.3	27.8	PA 380 west	Eastern terminus of PA 380
Westmoreland	Bell Township	18.8	30.3	PA 981 north (Harvat Road) – Avonmore, Salina	Western terminus of PA 981 concurrency
Westmoreland	Bell Township	19.0	30.6	PA 981 south (Harvat Road)	Eastern terminus of PA 981 concurrency
Indiana	Blacklick Township	31.4	50.5	PA 217 south	Northern terminus of PA 217
Indiana	White Township	36.6	58.9	US 422 / PA 56 / PA 286 Truck (Ben Franklin Highway) – Kittanning, Shelocta, Ebensburg, Homer City	Western terminus of PA 286 Truck
Indiana	White Township	37.5	60.4	US 422 Bus. (Indian Springs Road)	Interchange
Indiana	Indiana	39.6	63.7	PA 954 north (North 9th Street)	Western terminus of PA 954 concurrency
Indiana	Indiana	40.0	64.4	PA 954 south (South 6th Street)	Eastern terminus of PA 954 concurrency
Indiana	Indiana	42.5	68.4	PA 286 Truck to US 119 – Punxsutawney, Blairsville	Interchange; eastern terminus of PA 286 Truck
Indiana	Clymer	51.6	83.0	PA 403 north (6th Street) – Dixonville, Marion Center	Western terminus of PA 403 concurrency
Indiana	Clymer	51.8	83.4	PA 403 south (2nd Street) – Kenwood, Heilwood	Eastern terminus of PA 403 concurrency
Indiana	Green Township	57.4	92.4	PA 240 east	Western terminus of PA 240
Clearfield	Burnside Township	71.1	114.4	US 219	Eastern terminus of PA 286
1.000 mi = 1.609 km; 1.000 km = 0.621 mi: Concurrency terminus

== PA 286 Truck ==
Pennsylvania Route 286 Truck
- Location: Indiana, Pennsylvania
- Existed: 1995–present

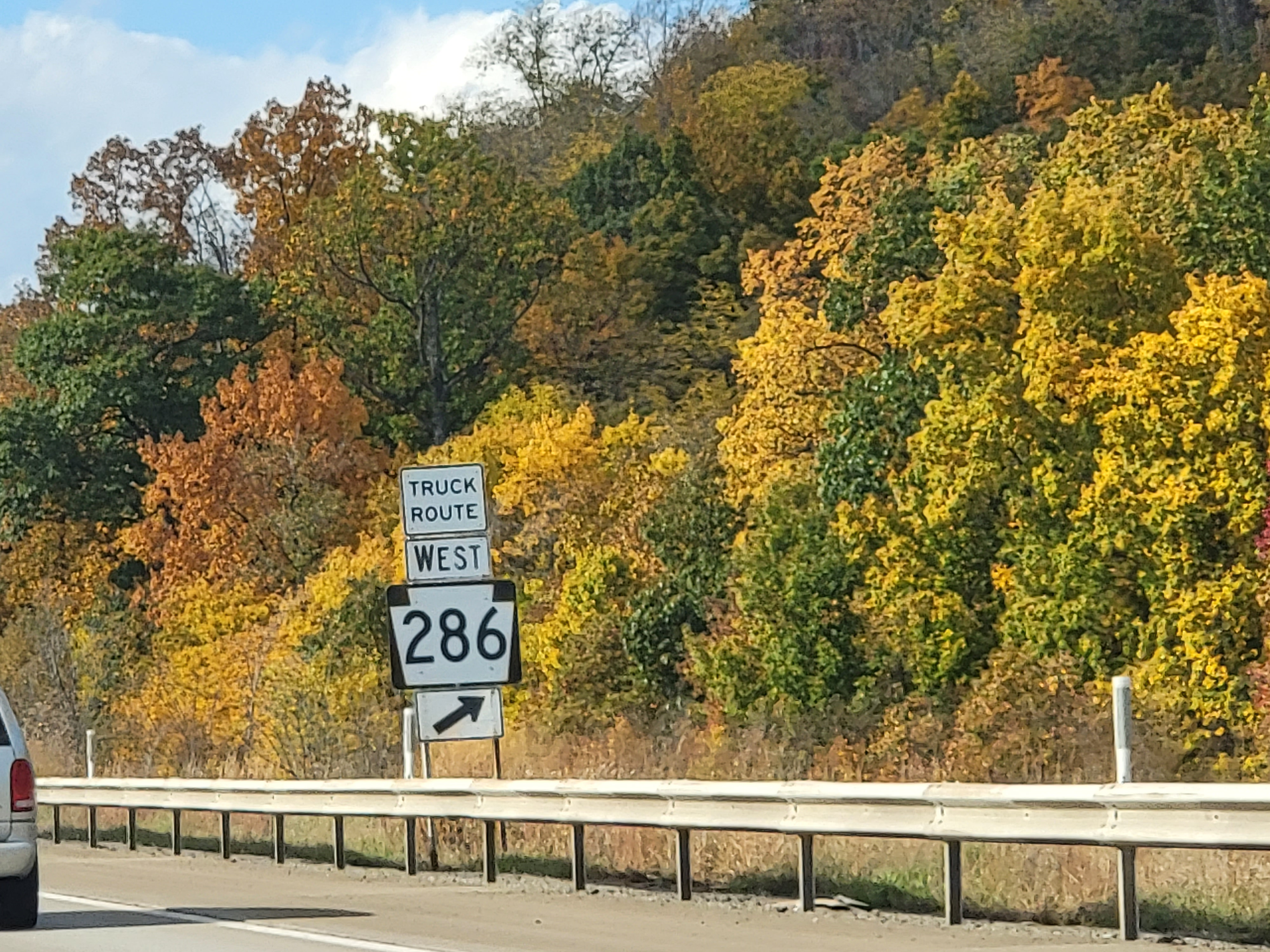
PA 286 Truck exiting US 422 and PA 56 onto mainline PA 286 near Indiana.

Pennsylvania Route 286 Truck is a 7-mile-long (11 km) truck route in Indiana County, Pennsylvania. The route starts at the interchange of PA 286 on US 422/PA 56.

After a short distance, the route heads north on US 119. The route eventually goes west, and eventually meets up again with PA 286 just east of Indiana.
