= Smithton Low-Level Bridge =

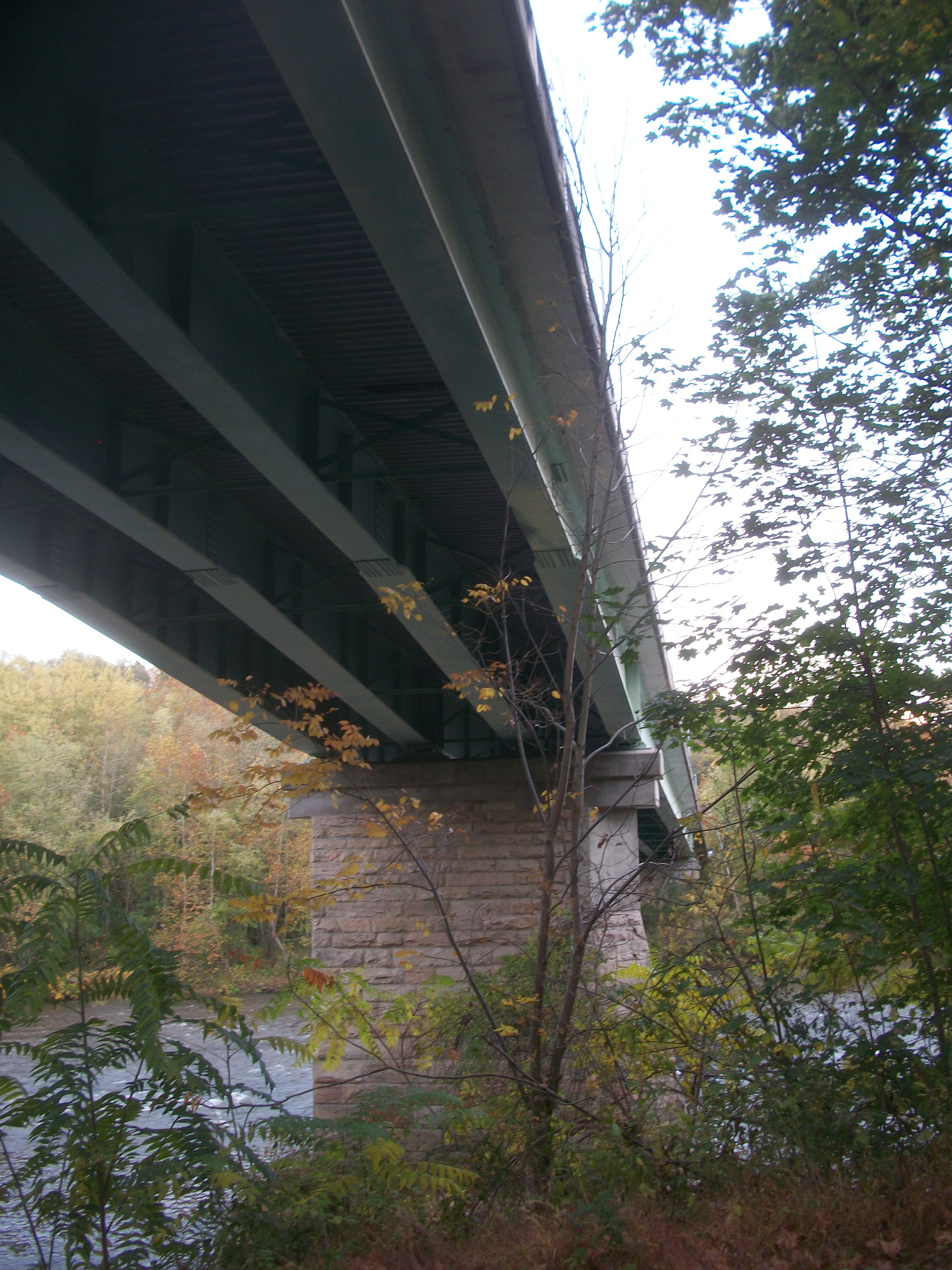
- Coordinates: 40°09′25″N 79°44′41″W
- Carries: Two lanes of PA 981
- Crosses: Youghiogheny River
- Locale: South Huntingdon Township and Rostraver Township

Characteristics
- Design: girder bridge
- Total length: 721 feet (220 m)
- Width: 28 feet (8.5 m)

History
- Opened: 1986

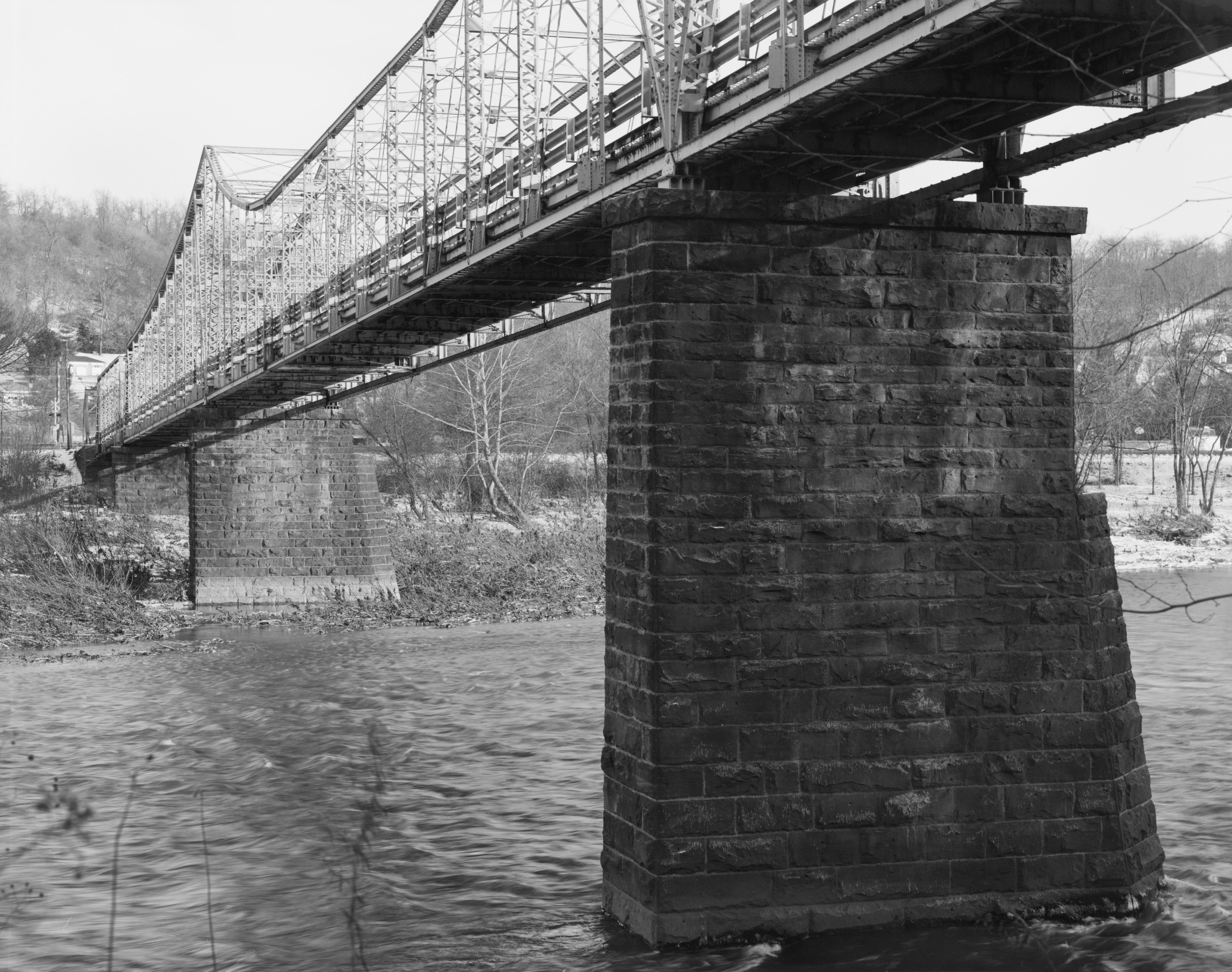
Original cantilever bridge at this location

The Smithton Low-Level Bridge is a structure that carries Pennsylvania Route 981 across the Youghiogheny River between South Huntingdon Township and Rostraver Township, just north of Smithton, Pennsylvania.

The previous structure on this site was a cantilever bridge built in 1900 to connect Smithton, which was then thriving due to its brewery, with residences on the west bank of the river; a state court ruled in favor of petitioners who demanded the creation of a bridge, but ordered that they contribute $1,200 in construction costs. Until the completion of the Smithton High-Level Bridge in 1956 (which eventually became part of busy Interstate 70), this structure was one of the most important vehicular crossings of the river. In 1986, the original bridge was replaced by a modern girder bridge.

== See also ==
- List of bridges documented by the Historic American Engineering Record in Pennsylvania
