= Pennsylvania Route 31 =

State highway in Pennsylvania, US

Pennsylvania Route 31

Route information
- Maintained by PennDOT
- Length: 74.74 mi (120.28 km)
- Existed: 1927–present

Major junctions
- West end: PA 136 near West Newton
- I-70 near Turkeytown; US 119 near Mount Pleasant; PA 982 in Laurelville I-70 Toll / I-76 Toll / Penna Turnpike in Donegal; PA 711 in Donegal; PA 381 near Jones Mills; PA 281 / PA 601 in Somerset; PA 160 near Berlin; PA 96 near Manns Choice
- East end: US 30 near Bedford

Location
- Country: United States
- State: Pennsylvania
- Counties: Westmoreland, Fayette, Somerset, Bedford

Highway system
- Pennsylvania State Route System; Interstate; US; State; Scenic; Legislative
← US 30	→ PA 32

Pennsylvania Route 31 (PA 31) is a 74-mile-long (119 km) state highway located in Western Pennsylvania, paralleling U.S. Route 30 (US 30) and the Pennsylvania Turnpike for most of its length. The designation begins at PA 136 near West Newton and ends at US 30 near Bedford.

== Route description ==
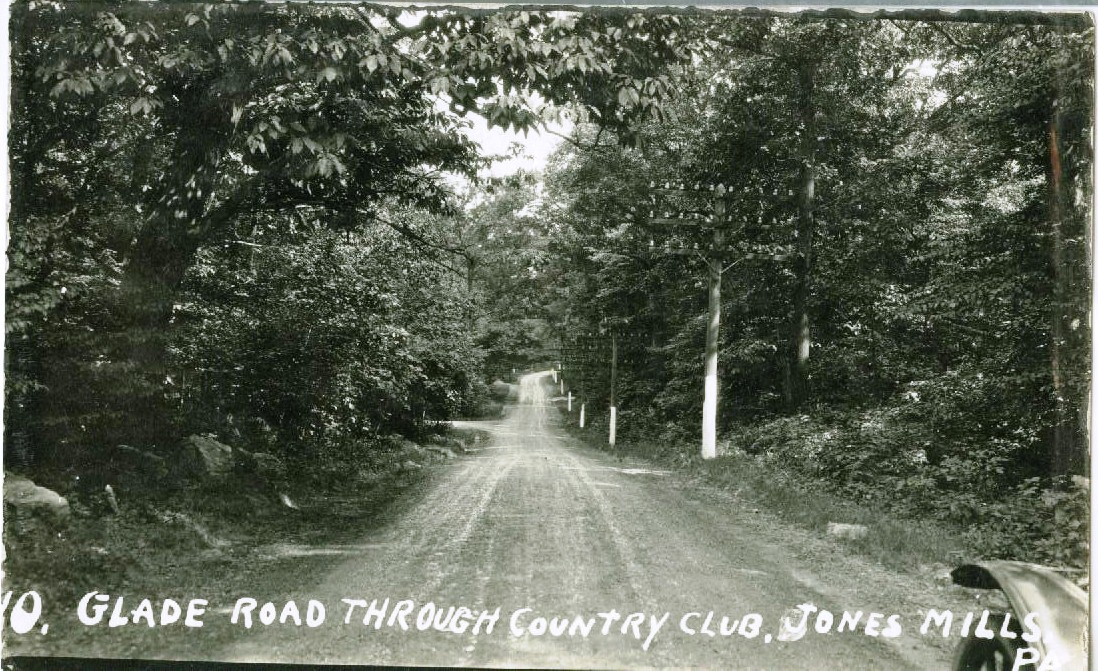
A dirt PA 31 near Jones Mills, Westmoreland County.

=== Westmoreland and Fayette counties ===
PA 31's designation begins at Pennsylvania Route 136 near West Newton. It travels east, interchanging with Interstate 70. After that interchange, PA 31 does not intersect any more numbered roads until it interchanges with U.S. Route 119 in the western part of Mount Pleasant. When PA 31 interchanges US 119, it turns from a two-lane surface road into first a four-lane road, and then into a city street as it goes through Mount Pleasant.

As PA 31 progresses through Mount Pleasant, it forms a concurrency with Pennsylvania Route 981. After that, it intersects Pennsylvania Route 819 before leaving the borough and entering the township.

The first intersection with a numbered road after entering the township is Pennsylvania Route 982. This is the only major intersection until it reaches Donegal. When it does reach Donegal, there is an entrance ramp to the Pennsylvania Turnpike, and immediately following that is the western terminus of the concurrency with Pennsylvania Route 711.

2 miles (3 km) later, PA 31 intersects Pennsylvania Route 381. This marks the eastern terminus of the concurrency with PA 711, and the western terminus of PA 381. It is also the northern terminus of the PA 381/711 concurrency as well. Before leaving Donegal Township, PA 31 approaches the eastern terminus of the concurrency with PA 381. This is the last major intersection before PA 31 winds its way through rural Pennsylvania to Somerset.

=== Somerset County ===
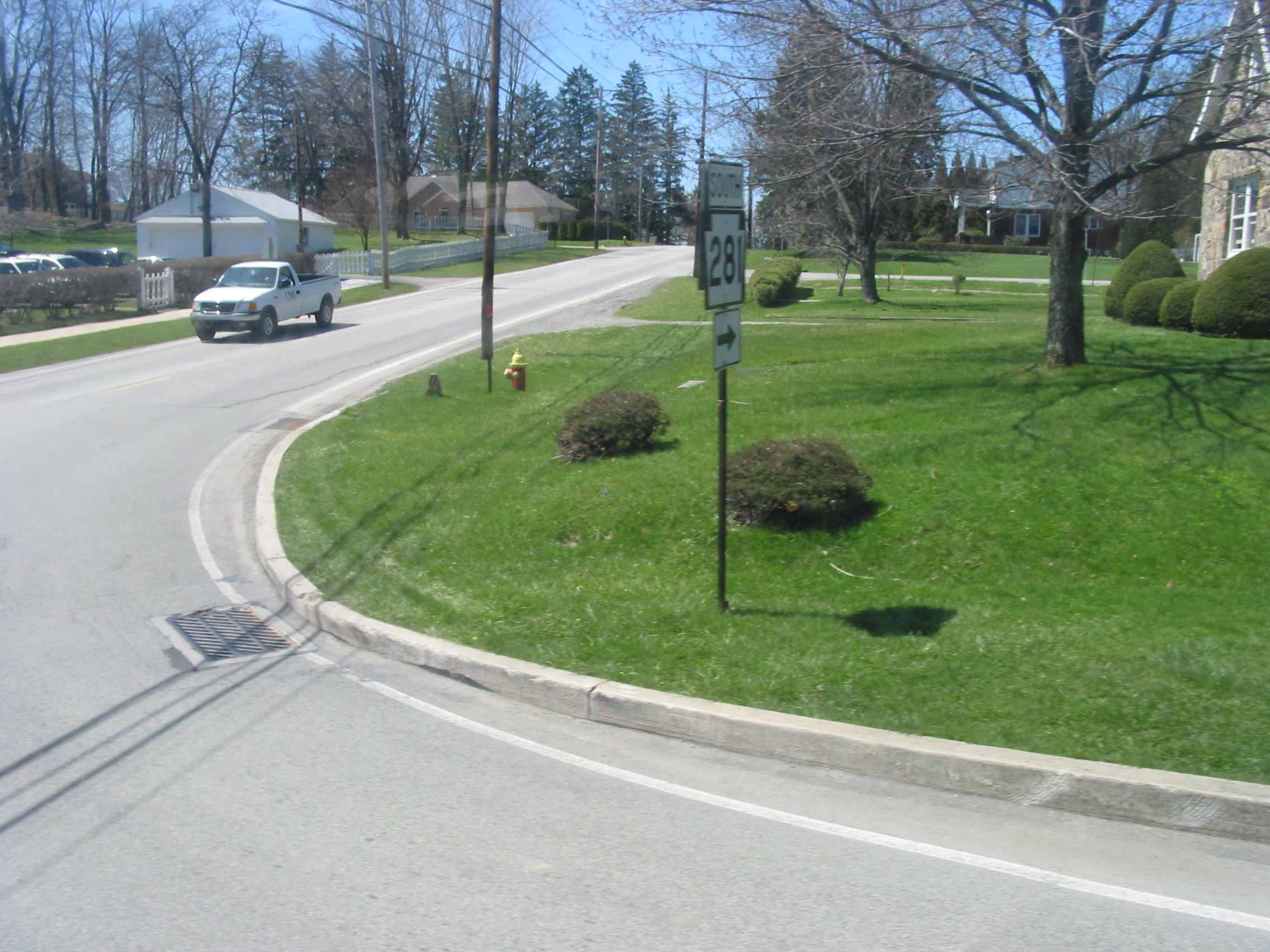
A view of southbound PA 281 at the western terminus of the concurrency.

Just after crossing the Westmoreland County/Somerset County line (the dividing line between the Pittsburgh metropolitan area and the Johnstown, Pennsylvania metro area, PA 31 provides entrance to the Hidden Valley Ski Resort area.

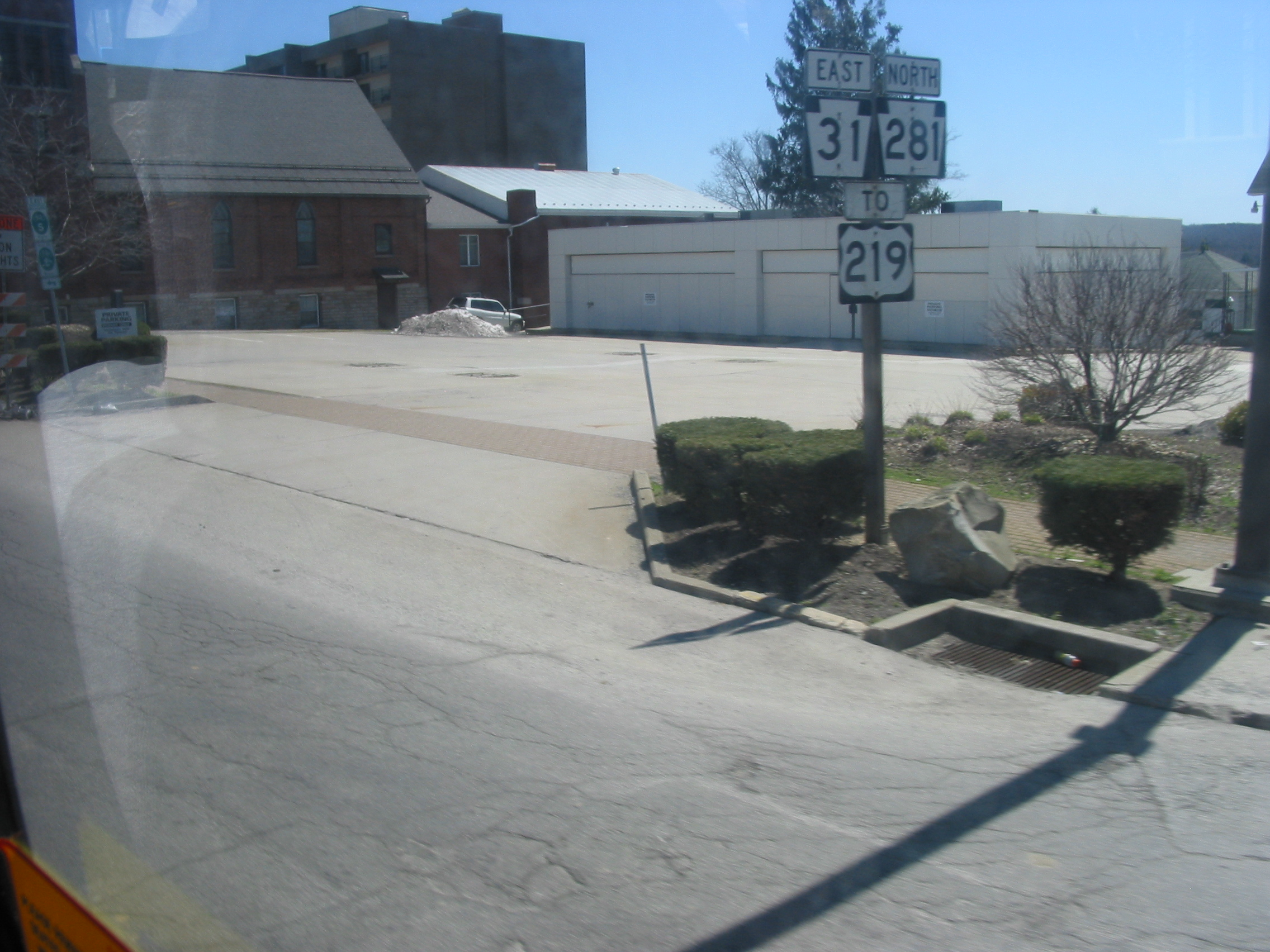
A view of the PA 31/281 concurrency eastbound.

After winding past rural Westmoreland and Fayette Counties, PA 31 enters Somerset County and encounters the borough of Somerset. Immediately after entering Somerset, PA 31 intersects Pennsylvania Route 281 and forms a concurrency on one-way pairs. While being concurrent, both highways intersect the southern terminus of Pennsylvania Route 601. Not a long while after, PA 31/281 end the concurrency, as PA 281 splits north, while PA 31 continues east.

Past the downtown area, PA 31 weaves through the Pennsylvania Turnpike and passes over U.S. Route 219. PA 31 continues toward Roxbury, running along the border between Stonycreek Township and Brothersvalley Township. The intersection with Pennsylvania Route 160 is the last intersection in Somerset County and the only one in Roxbury. After this intersection, PA 31 generally parallels the Turnpike and winds through hilly terrain, passing through Allegheny Township on its way east.

=== Bedford County ===
Entering Bedford County, there are no major intersections with any numbered roads until PA 31 enters Manns Choice. Instead, it winds through hilly terrain that parallels the Turnpike. As PA 31 nears Manns Choice, it intersects Pennsylvania Route 96 and is concurrent for 1.81 mi (2.91 km). After separating, PA 31 continues for 3.44 mi (5.54 km) before terminating at U.S. Route 30, adjacent to the historic Jean Bonnet Tavern.

== History ==
The portion of the highway that runs through Mount Pleasant borough is said to have evolved from a Native American path that predated European settlers. With the coming of European settlers, it became an important access road to the western wilderness and to more settled areas to the east.

As early as 1772, a road called Glades Road had originally led from Somerset to Bedford, which were the places of two Underground Railroad stations. The road would become PA 31 and would go through the towns of West Newton, Mount Pleasant, Monongahela, and Washington that had also organized underground railroad stations.

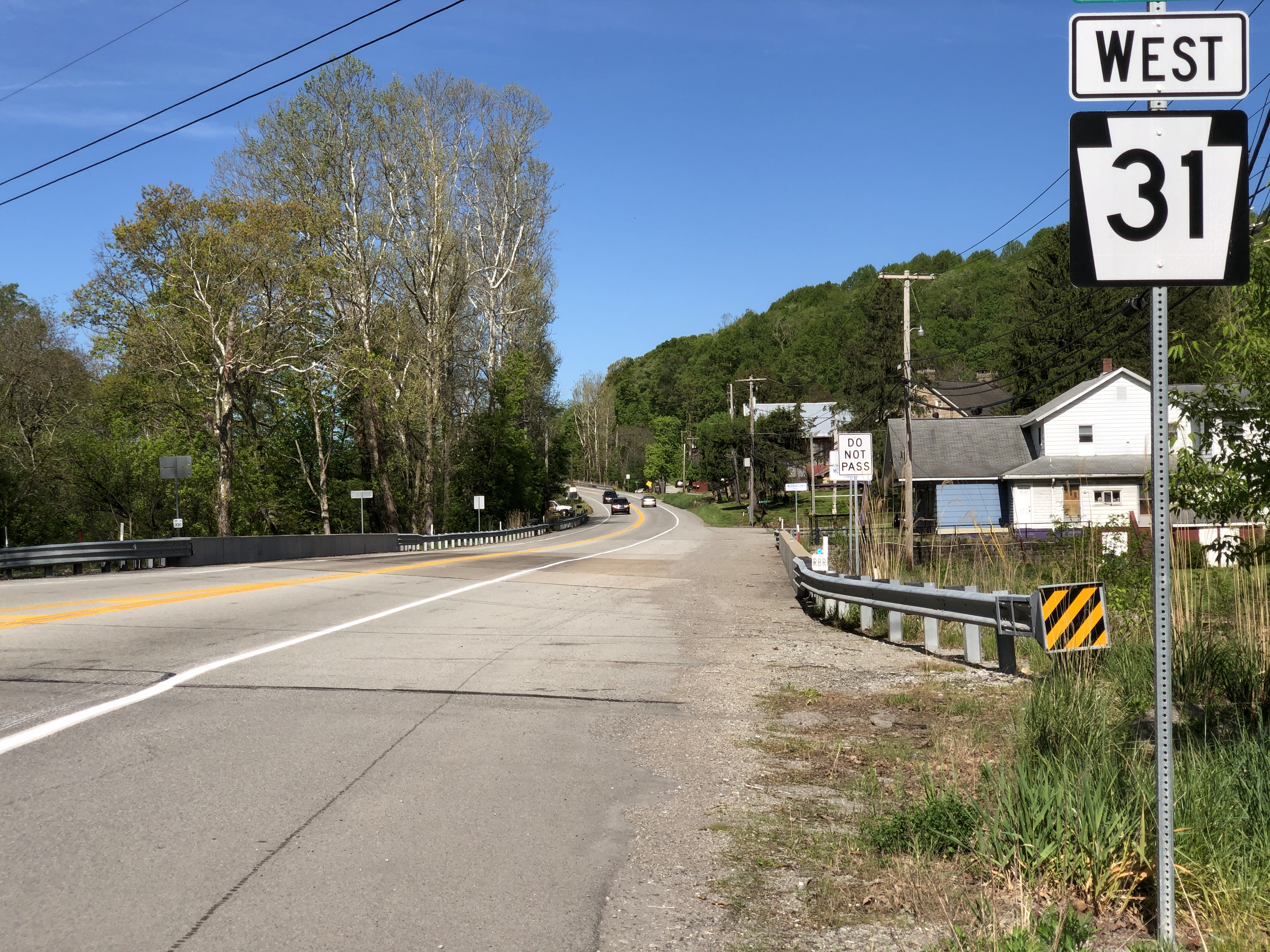
PA 31 westbound past PA 982 in Laurelville

In 1911, the Sproul Road Bill defined Legislative Route 181 for the segment between Washington and West Newton, LR 186 between West Newton and Somerset, LR 364 between Somerset and Dividing Ridge, and LR 49 between Dividing Ridge and Bedford.

The PA 31 designation began appearing on road maps and signage in 1927. At that time, the western terminus was at the West Virginia line at West Virginia Route 27. The east end back then was still at US 30, unchanged from today. On its way eastward, PA 31 met the southern terminus of PA 28 near Avella, was concurrent with PA 18 and US 19, and traded paths with US 40 in Washington.

In September 1964, the western terminus of PA 31 was truncated to its current location at the intersection of Mount Pleasant Road and Greensburg Pike in West Newton. Two segments of the decommissioned route were renumbered. PA 136 was designated from the western terminus of PA 31 to US 40/PA 18 in Washington. PA 844 (Jefferson Avenue) was designated from PA 18 (Henderson Avenue) to the PA/WV state line. This left a gap of 1.4 miles of the former PA 31 which ran concurrently with PA 18 (and very briefly with US 40) between the termini of the newly designated routes (PA 844 east, PA 136 west). As a result, this gap did not need renumbered or any additional designations. PA 31 was truncated in order to avoid intersecting I-70 at multiple locations; the state only wanted state routes to intersect an Interstate highway once to avoid motorist confusion.

== Major intersections ==
County	Location	mi	km	Destinations	Notes
Westmoreland	West Newton	0.00	0.00	PA 136 (Mt. Pleasant Road/Greensburg Pike) – Madison, Greensburg	Western terminus, former routing of PA 71
Westmoreland	South Huntingdon Township	3.14	5.05	I-70 – Washington, New Stanton	Exit 51 (I-70)
Westmoreland	Mount Pleasant	11.49	18.49	US 119 – New Stanton, Connellsville	Interchange
Westmoreland	Mount Pleasant	12.06	19.41	PA 981 south (Morewood Street)	West end of PA 981 concurrency
Westmoreland	Mount Pleasant	12.43	20.00	PA 981 north (North Church Street)	East end of PA 981 concurrency
Westmoreland	Mount Pleasant	12.62	20.31	PA 819 (Diamond Street)	
Fayette	Bullskin Township	15.71	25.28	PA 982 – Kecksburg, Connellsville	
Westmoreland	Donegal	21.85	35.16	I-70 Toll / I-76 Toll / Penna Turnpike – Pittsburgh, Harrisburg	Donegal Interchange exit 91 (I-70 / I-76 / Penna Turnpike); E-ZPass or toll-by-plate
Westmoreland	Donegal	22.15	35.65	PA 711 north – Stahlstown, Ligonier	West end of PA 711 concurrency
Westmoreland	Donegal Township	24.02	38.66	PA 381 south / PA 711 south (Jones Mill Road) – Seven Springs, Normalville	West end of PA 381 concurrency, East end of PA 711 concurrency
Westmoreland	Donegal Township	24.69	39.73	PA 381 north – Kregar	East end of PA 381 concurrency.
Somerset	Somerset	40.33	64.90	PA 281 south (Franklin Avenue)	West end of PA 281 concurrency
Somerset	Somerset	40.68	65.47	PA 601 (Central Avenue)	Southern terminus of PA 601, Former routing of US 219 through Somerset
Somerset	Somerset	40.90	65.82	PA 281 north (Pleasant Avenue) to US 219 north / Penna Turnpike	East end of PA 281 concurrency
Somerset	Stonycreek Township	50.99	82.06	PA 160 – Central City, Berlin	Former routing of US 219
Bedford	Manns Choice	69.49	111.83	PA 96 north (Shawnee Road) – Schellsburg	West end of PA 96 concurrency
Bedford	Manns Choice	71.30	114.75	PA 96 south (Hyndman Road) – Cumberland	East end of PA 96 concurrency
Bedford	Bedford Township	74.74	120.28	US 30 (Lincoln Highway) – Schellsburg, Bedford	Eastern terminus
1.000 mi = 1.609 km; 1.000 km = 0.621 mi: Concurrency terminus; Electronic toll collection

== Attractions ==
=== Glades Pike Inn ===
The Glades Pike Inn is a notable inn situated on the Glades Pike section of PA 31 in Somerset. Since 1842, the inn was a place for weary travelers to unhitch their horses for a good place to eat and sleep. The modern day visitors of the inn use it for different reasons of traveling. The inn is located in the Laurel Mountains recreational area.

=== Glades Pike Winery ===
The Glades Pike Winery is situated on the section of PA 31 known as Glades Pike, between Somerset and Donegal. Established in 1994, the winery is the place where visitors are offered samples of the award-winning wine varieties.

== Notes ==
1. May be hard to see, as it is a JPEG map scan.
