= Sutersville Bridge =

- Coordinates: 40°14′N 79°49′W
- Carries: First Street (SR 2020)
- Crosses: Youghiogheny River
- Locale: Sutersville and Elizabeth Township, Pennsylvania

Characteristics
- Design: girder bridge
- Total length: 607 feet (185 m)
- Width: 30 feet (9.1 m)

History
- Opened: 1986

Location
- Interactive map of Sutersville Bridge

The Sutersville Bridge is a structure that crosses the Youghiogheny River between Sutersville and Elizabeth Township, Pennsylvania. It connects a rural southeastern corner of Allegheny County with a small Westmoreland County town.

Previously, a 1902 truss bridge stood on the site. After having to be temporarily closed in 1983 due to poor conditions, the Casey Co. of Aspinwall, Pennsylvania got the contract in February 1985.

It was replaced by the current bridge in 1986, as part of a major rehabilitation project along Western Pennsylvania's rivers; it shares its construction style with a variety of other bridges assembled during the same era. The Youghiogheny River Trail features a parking facility adjacent to the bridge's western approach.
