= Smithton High-Level Bridge =

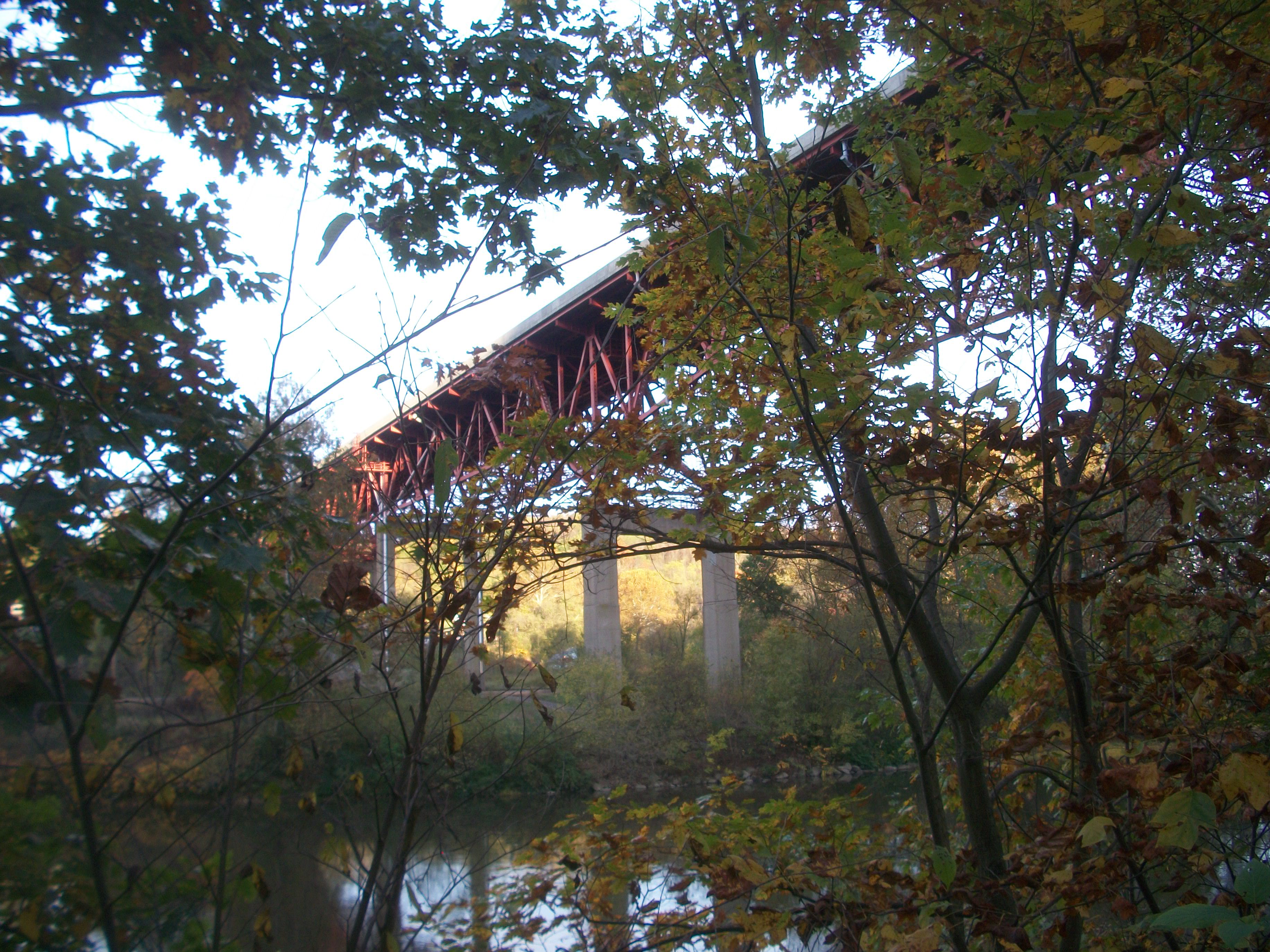
- Peeking out from between the trees along the Yough River Trail.
- Coordinates: 40°10′N 79°46′W
- Carries: I-70
- Crosses: Youghiogheny River
- Locale: South Huntingdon Township and Rostraver Township

Characteristics
- Design: truss bridge
- Total length: 1355 ft
- Width: 64 ft

History
- Opened: 1956

The Smithton High-Level Bridge is a structure that crosses the Youghiogheny River between South Huntingdon Township and Rostraver Township.

The bridge was opened in 1956 as one of the last links in the replacement of the old alignment of Pennsylvania Route 71 with a new four-lane freeway between Washington and the Pennsylvania Turnpike. During the same year of the bridge's completion, it was announced that the highway would become part of Interstate 70; it took on this designation in 1964 after the completion of freeway stretches in neighboring West Virginia linked PA 71 to a similar freeway in Ohio.

Part of a busy truck route, the bridge is part of a highway that has been plagued by surface problems. In 1989, a crack in the superstructure, the result of a 35-year-old construction error, forced the closure of the bridge for five days, stranding truckers. The bridge was rehabilitated in 2000.

== See also ==
- List of crossings of the Youghiogheny River
