= West Newton Bridge =

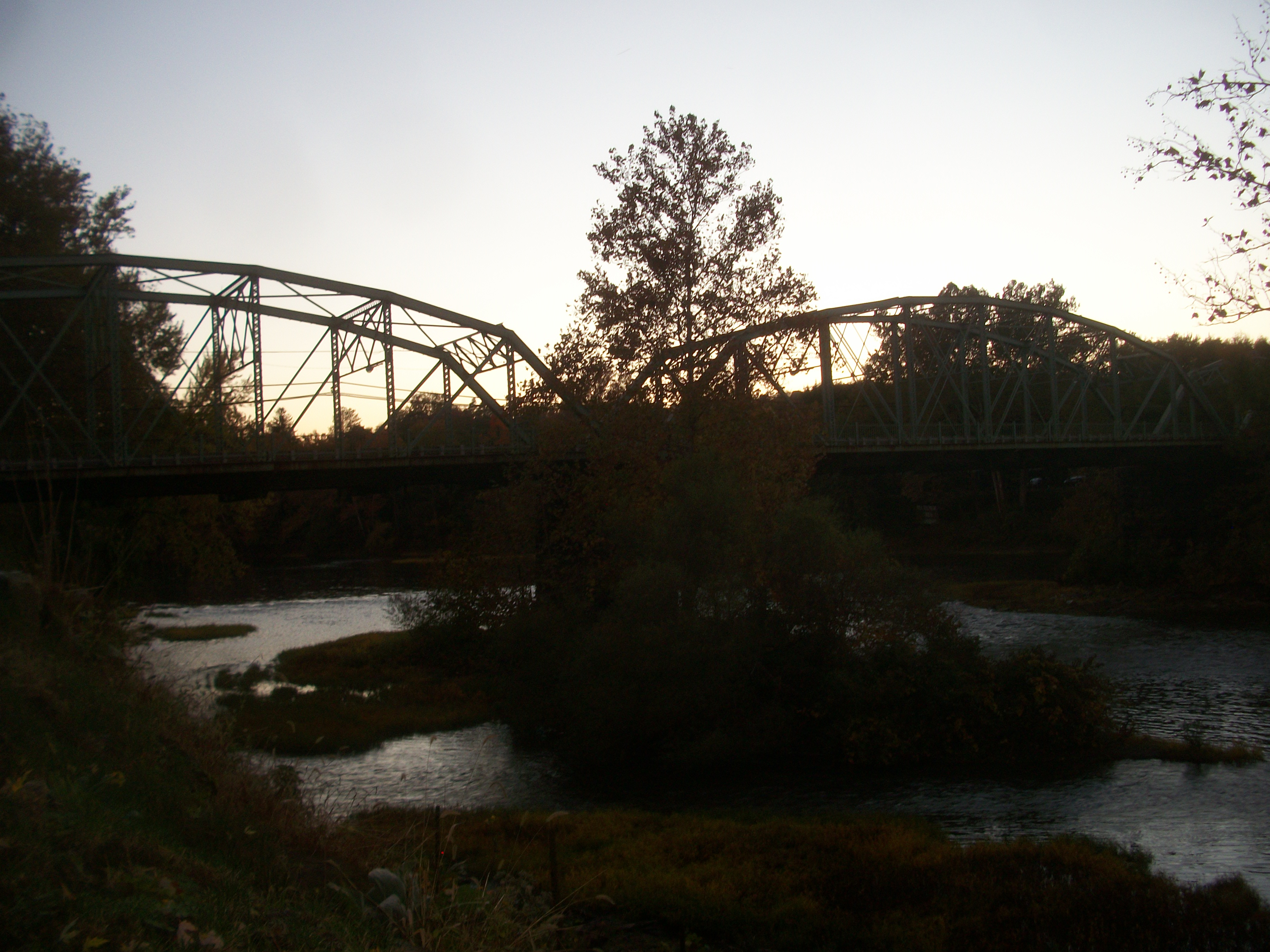
- Coordinates: 40°13′N 79°46′W
- Carries: PA 136
- Crosses: Youghiogheny River
- Locale: West Newton, Pennsylvania

Characteristics
- Design: truss bridge
- Total length: 492 ft
- Width: 23 ft

History
- Opened: 1907

The West Newton Bridge is a structure that crosses the Youghiogheny River between the eastern and western portions of West Newton, Pennsylvania.

Constructed in 1907, the bridge carries two lanes of Pennsylvania Route 136. In an era in which many truss bridges were replaced, the structure was instead rehabilitated in 1984, as part of a proposal for a historic district along West Newton's Main Street. The Youghiogheny River Trail features a parking facility adjacent to the bridge's western approach.

During the summer of 2010, the bridge was temporarily closed for two weeks. Emergency repairs were needed to repair corrosion that was discovered during a routine painting project.
