= Pennsylvania Route 819 =

State highway in Pennsylvania, US

Pennsylvania Route 819

Route information
- Maintained by PennDOT
- Length: 46.644 mi (75.066 km)

Major junctions
- South end: PA 201 in Vanderbilt
- US 119 in East Huntingdon Township; PA 31 in Mount Pleasant; US 119 from South Greensburg to Greensburg; US 30 in Southwest Greensburg; PA 130 in Greensburg; US 22 in Salem Township; PA 286 in Bell Township; PA 380 in Bell Township; PA 981 in Bell Township
- North end: PA 66 in Oklahoma

Location
- Country: United States
- State: Pennsylvania
- Counties: Fayette, Westmoreland

Highway system
- Pennsylvania State Route System; Interstate; US; State; Scenic; Legislative
← PA 813	→ PA 820

Pennsylvania Route 819 (PA 819) is a 46.6-mile-long (75.0 km) state highway located in Fayette and Westmoreland counties in Pennsylvania, United States. The southern terminus is at PA 201 in Vanderbilt. The northern terminus is at PA 66 in Oklahoma.

== History ==
The portion of the highway that runs through Mount Pleasant borough is said to have evolved from a Native American path that predated European settlers.

== Route description ==
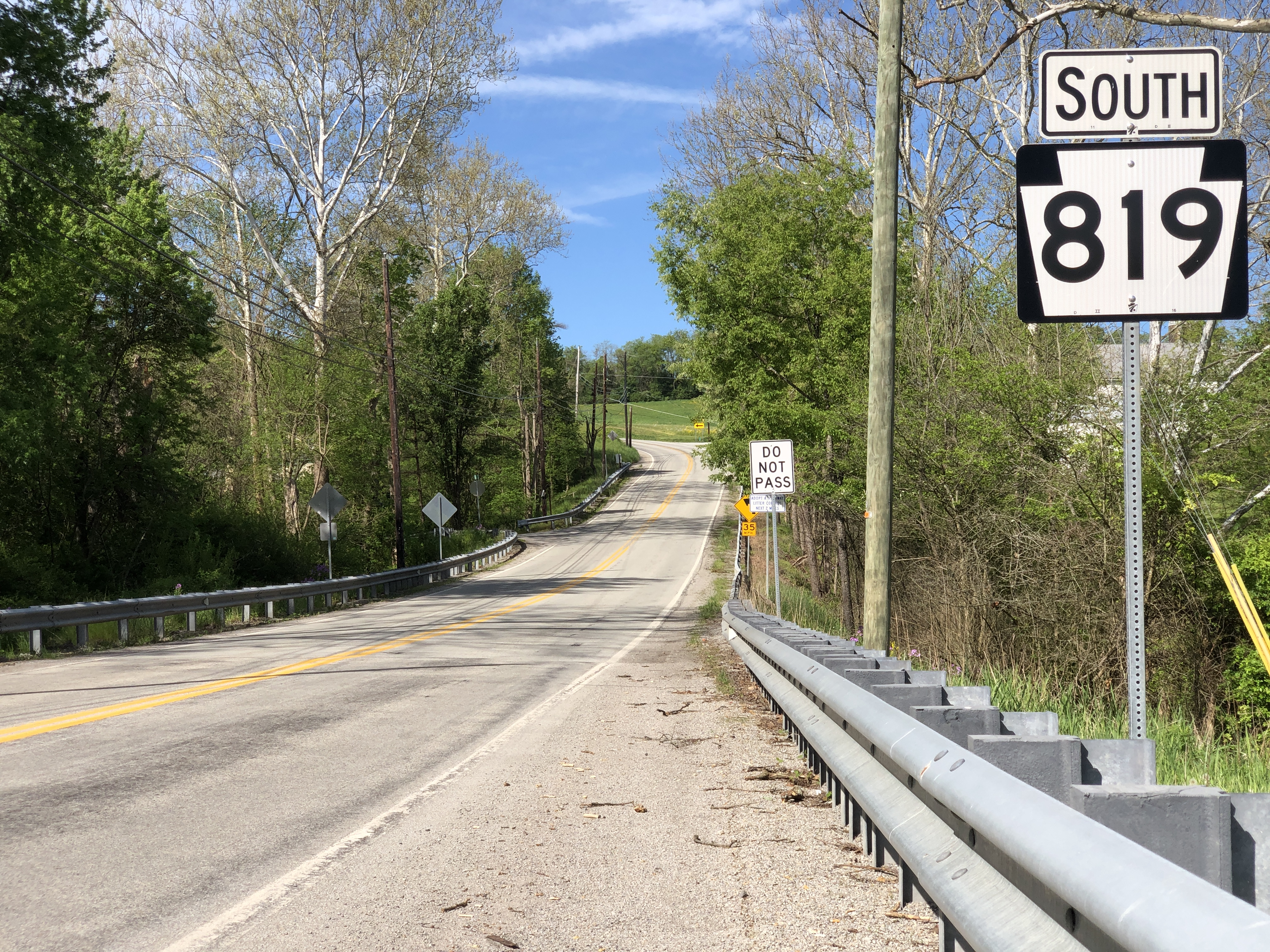
PA 819 southbound in Upper Tyrone Township

PA 819 begins at an intersection with PA 201 in the borough of Vanderbilt in Fayette County, heading north on two-lane undivided Dawson Road. The road passes through residential areas, crossing into Dunbar Township and heading into the community of Dickerson Run. Here, the route curves northwest, turning north onto Main Street and west onto 2nd Street as it passes more homes. PA 819 curves north onto Dawson Road and leaves the community, heading northeast across the Youghiogheny River into the borough of Dawson. Here, the route becomes Laughlin Street and passes more residences, crossing CSX's Keystone Subdivision railroad line and turning southeast onto Railroad Street, running parallel to the railroad tracks. PA 819 turns northeast onto Main Street and runs through more residential areas before becoming the border between Dawson to the west and Lower Tyrone Township to the east as it heads into wooded areas. The route fully enters Lower Tyrone Township and heads into open agricultural areas with some trees and homes, turning east onto Dawson Scottdale Road and curving northeast again. The road winds north through more rural areas before turning northeast and crossing into Upper Tyrone Township. Here, the route passes through Tintsman and crosses under a Wheeling and Lake Erie Railway line, becoming Scottdale Dawson Road as it runs through areas of farms and woods with some residences.

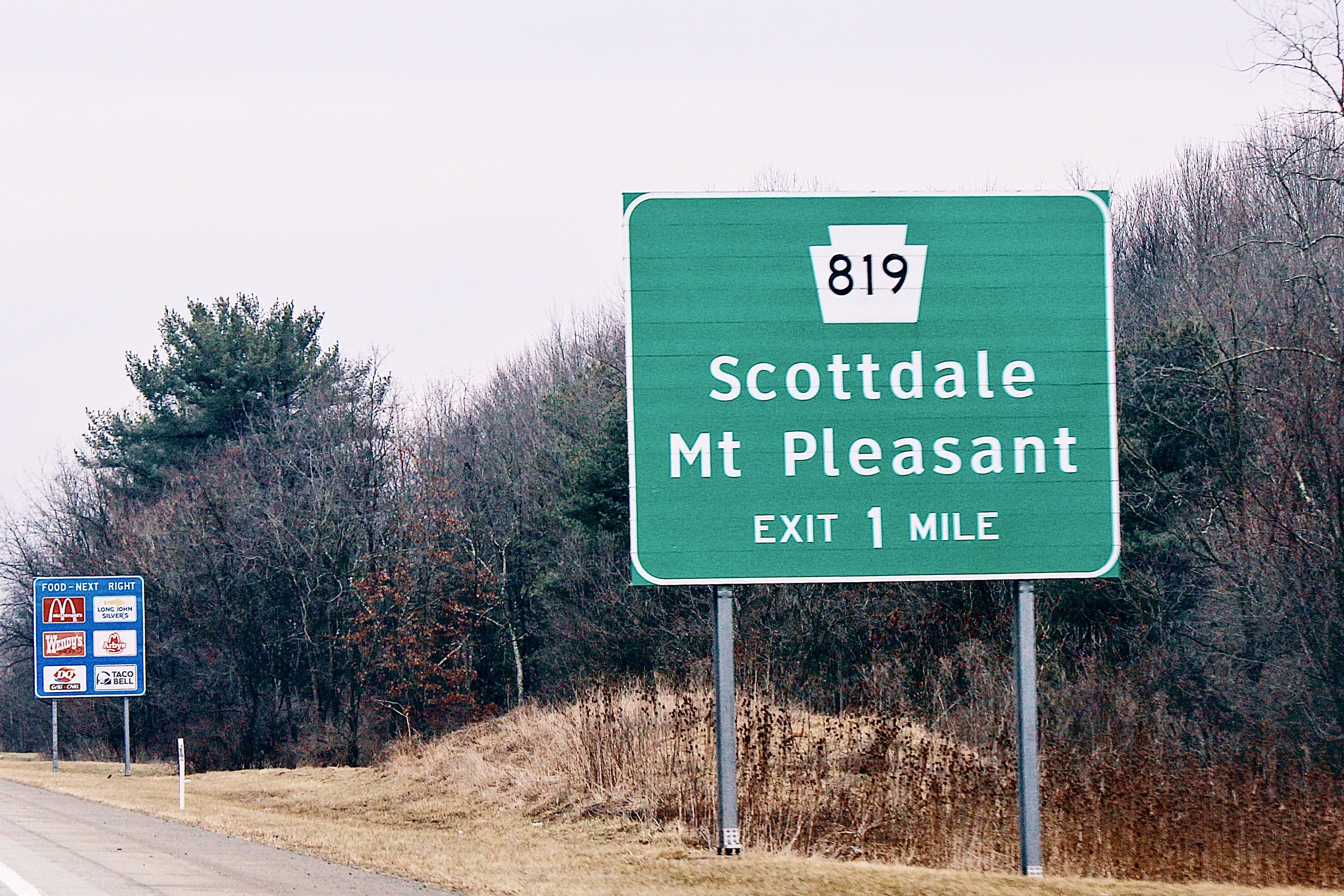
Exit from 119 to 819 towards Mount Pleasant and Scottdale

PA 819 crosses Jacobs Creek into East Huntingdon Township in Westmoreland County and turns north, running through farmland with some homes. The road turns east and enters the borough of Scottdale, becoming South Broadway Street and heading northeast past homes. The route curves north-northeast and continues into the commercial downtown, becoming North Broadway Street. PA 819 heads north into residential areas and runs to the west of the Southwest Pennsylvania Railroad's Radebaugh Subdivision line, turning east onto Porter Avenue and crossing the railroad tracks. The road becomes the border between South Huntingdon Township to the north and Scottdale to the south as it passes more homes with some businesses, fully entering Scottdale again before heading into South Huntingdon Township and turning northeast. The route heads through farmland and woodland with some residential and commercial development, passing through West Overton. PA 819 comes to an interchange with U.S. Route 119 (US 119) and widens into a four-lane divided highway, heading into business areas. The road curves north and becomes two lanes and undivided, running through open agricultural areas with some housing developments. The route turns northeast onto South Diamond Street and briefly forms the border between the borough of Mount Pleasant to the northwest and Mount Pleasant Township to the southeast before fully entering Mount Pleasant and passing homes. PA 819 heads into the commercial downtown and crosses PA 31, at which point it becomes North Diamond Street. The road continues northeast through more residential areas with some businesses, crossing into Mount Pleasant Township. The route turns north onto Low Street and runs past homes, passing through Standard and curving to the northwest. PA 819 passes through more rural residential areas as an unnamed road and intersects PA 981 immediately before passing under the Southwest Pennsylvania Railroad's Mount Pleasant Subdivision line.

The road heads into a mix of farmland and woodland with some homes and continues north, passing over Pennsylvania Turnpike (Interstate 70 (I-70)/I-76). At this point, the route becomes Mt. Pleasant Road, passing through open agricultural areas with some woods and residences. PA 819 heads into more wooded areas with some fields and homes, becoming the border between Hempfield Township to the west and Mount Pleasant Township to the east. The road crosses Township Line Run to fully enter Hempfield Township and pass through the community of Armbrust. The route continues north through more rural areas with some residences as an unnamed road. Farther north, PA 819 heads through wooded areas with some homes as Armbrust Road, passing through St. Clair. The route curves northeast and heads into the borough of South Greensburg, running past more residences and turning west-northwest onto Reamer Avenue. PA 819 turns north-northeast onto Broad Street and heads past homes with some businesses. The route turns west-northwest onto Huff Avenue and passes through industrial areas, crossing the Five Star Trail and the Southwest Pennsylvania Railroad's Greensburg Industrial Track line. PA 819 comes to an intersection with US 119 and turns north to form a concurrency with that route on four-lane divided South Main Street, passing businesses. The road enters the borough of Southwest Greensburg and comes to an interchange with the US 30 freeway, at which point US 119 and PA 819 become concurrent with PA 66 Business. The three routes pass through more commercial areas with some homes, narrowing into a two-lane undivided road. The road heads into the city of Greensburg and continues into the commercial downtown.

Here, it intersects the eastbound direction of PA 130, which follows Pittsburgh Street, at which point US 119/PA 819 split from PA 66 Business to join PA 130 onto a one-way pair. Northbound US 119/PA 819 join eastbound PA 130 on one-way East Pittsburgh Street, carrying two travel lanes, before splitting to the north onto two-way Arch Avenue and rejoining southbound US 119/PA 819. Southbound US 119/PA 819 head west along with westbound PA 130 on one-way East Otterman Street with two lanes. At the PA 66 Business intersection, westbound PA 130 heads north along with that route and southbound US 119/PA 819 head south to rejoin the northbound direction. Past the one-way pair, both directions of US 119/PA 819 run northeast on two-lane undivided Arch Avenue, passing homes before curving north and crossing under Norfolk Southern's Pittsburgh Line. The two routes turn east onto Beacon Street, with PA 819 soon splitting from US 119 by heading north onto Harvey Avenue. The road passes near a few businesses before heading into residential areas, becoming the border between Greensburg to the west and Hempfield Township to the east. The route heads between homes and woods to the west and fields to the east before passing through residential neighborhoods as it fully enters Greensburg again. PA 819 crosses back into Hempfield Township and runs through a mix of farmland and woodland with some homes, turning northeast and passing through Forbes Road. The road heads into Salem Township and becomes an unnamed road, heading north through more rural areas with some residences. Farther north, the route comes to an intersection with US 22 in Five Points. A park and ride lot is located at the southeast corner of this intersection. Immediately past this intersection, PA 819 turns northeast and continues through more farms and woods with some homes, curving to the north. The road runs through more rural areas and heads north-northwest, passing through Slickville. The route crosses into Bell Township and turns north, coming to an intersection with PA 286. Past this, PA 819 runs through more wooded areas with some fields and homes, curving northeast before heading north and coming to a junction with PA 380. The road winds northeast and reaches an intersection with the northern terminus of PA 981. At this point, the route turns northwest, curving west before turning back to the northwest. The road continues northwest through more woodland with some farms and homes, curving north into forested areas and becoming Stefaniak Drive. PA 819 turns west and crosses Beaver Run into Washington Township, soon ending at an intersection with PA 66.

== Major intersections ==
County	Location	mi	km	Destinations	Notes
Fayette	Vanderbilt	0.000	0.000	PA 201 (Vanderbilt Road) – Connellsville, Fayette City	Southern terminus of PA 819
Westmoreland	South Huntingdon Township	9.476– 9.756	15.250– 15.701	US 119 – New Stanton, Connellsville	Interchange
Westmoreland	Mount Pleasant	11.786	18.968	PA 31 (West Main Street)	
Westmoreland	Mount Pleasant Township	13.327	21.448	PA 981 – Mt. Pleasant, Carpentertown	
Westmoreland	South Greensburg	22.238	35.789	US 119 south (South Main Street) / Huff Avenue	Southern terminus of US 119 concurrency
Westmoreland	Southwest Greensburg	22.485– 22.506	36.186– 36.220	US 30 to PA Turnpike 66 – Pittsburgh PA 66 Bus. begins	Interchange, southern terminus of PA 66 Business concurrency
Westmoreland	Greensburg	23.740	38.206	PA 130 (Pittsburgh Street) / PA 66 Bus. north (Main Street)	Northern terminus of PA 66 Business concurrency, southern end of PA 130 eastbound concurrency
Westmoreland	Greensburg	23.936	38.521	PA 130 east (East Pittsburgh Street) to US 30 east – Ligonier	Northern terminus of PA 130 eastbound concurrency southbound
Westmoreland	Greensburg	24.001	38.626	PA 130 (East Otterman Street)	Northern terminus of PA 130 westbound concurrency
Westmoreland	Greensburg	24.245	39.019	US 119 north (New Alexandria Road)	Northern terminus of US 119 concurrency
Westmoreland	Salem Township	31.274	50.331	US 22 (William Penn Highway) – Murrysville, New Alexandria	
Westmoreland	Bell Township	38.245	61.549	PA 286 (Reservoir Road/Alcorns Cross Road) – Mamont, Saltsburg	
Westmoreland	Bell Township	39.983	64.346	PA 380 – North Washington, Saltsburg	
Westmoreland	Bell Township	41.151	66.226	PA 981 south – Avonmore	Northern terminus of PA 981
Westmoreland	Washington Township	46.644	75.066	PA 66	Northern terminus of PA 819
1.000 mi = 1.609 km; 1.000 km = 0.621 mi: Concurrency terminus
