= U.S. Route 119 in Pennsylvania =

Segment of American highway

U.S. Route 119
- US 119 highlighted in red

Route information
- Auxiliary route of US 19
- Maintained by PennDOT
- Length: 133 mi (214 km)

Major junctions
- South end: US 119 at the West Virginia state line in Point Marion
- PA 43 / PA 857 in Uniontown; PA 21 in Uniontown; US 40 / US 40 Bus. in Uniontown; PA Turnpike 43 / PA 51 in Uniontown; PA 31 near Mt. Pleasant; PA Turnpike 66 in New Stanton; US 30 in Greensburg; US 22 near Blairsville; US 422 / PA 56 near Indiana; US 322 near DuBois
- North end: US 219 in Sandy Township

Location
- Country: United States
- State: Pennsylvania
- Counties: Fayette, Westmoreland, Indiana, Jefferson, Clearfield

Highway system
- United States Numbered Highway System; List; Special; Divided; Pennsylvania State Route System; Interstate; US; State; Scenic; Legislative
← PA 118	→ PA 120

U.S. Route 119 (US 119) travels through Connellsville, Greensburg, and Punxsutawney, and bypasses Uniontown and Indiana. There are numerous other boroughs and villages along its 133-mile (214 km) route in the Keystone State. The southern entrance of US 119 is at the West Virginia state line one-half-mile south of Point Marion. The northern terminus is at US 219 two miles (3 km) south of DuBois, Pennsylvania. US 119 is in the National Highway System from the West Virginia state line to Exit 0 of PA Turnpike 66, and from US 22 to US 219. From US 22 to US 219, the highway carries the name of the Buffalo-Pittsburgh Highway; from US 22 to PA 56, it is also known as the Patrick J. Stapleton Highway; near Uniontown, it bears the name George C. Marshall Parkway.

Concurrencies along the route include PA 43 from Chadville to US 40; US 40 from the Hopwood interchange to Main Street, Uniontown; Truck PA 711 from Connellsville to North Connellsville; PA 819 from the borough of South Greensburg to the City of Greensburg; Business PA 66 from US 30 in South Greensburg to Greensburg; PA 130 in Greensburg; US 22 from Shieldsburg to two miles (3 km) east of Blairsville; PA 56 from Homer City to US 422; Business US 422 from the Wayne Avenue interchange to the US 422 interchange; Truck PA 286 from US 422 to PA 286; and PA 36 in Punxsutawney.

== Route description ==
=== Fayette County ===
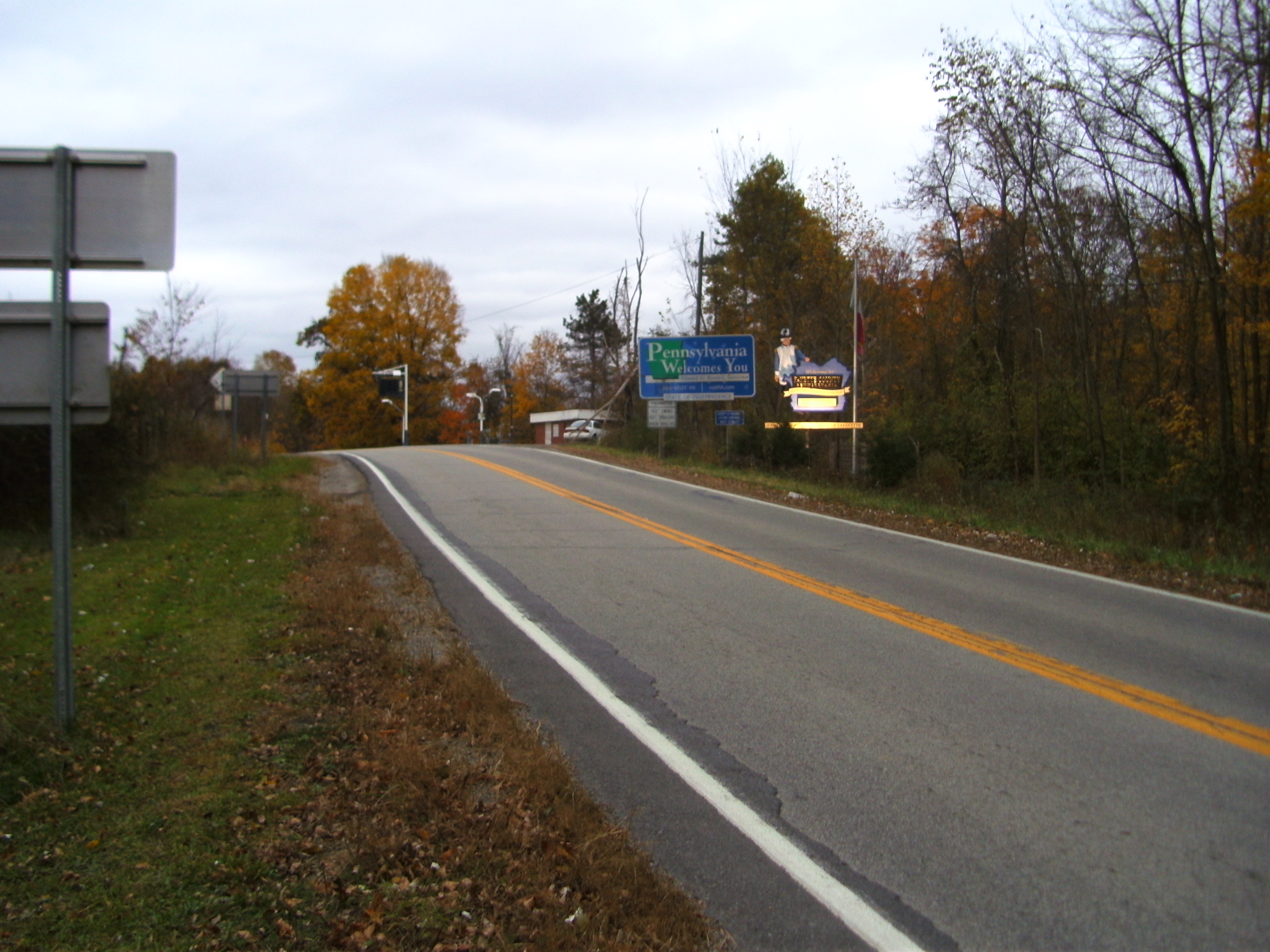
US 119 as it enters Pennsylvania just south of Point Marion in Fayette County

US 119 enters Pennsylvania from Monongalia County, West Virginia just south of Point Marion, Pennsylvania. On Morgantown Road for most of its route south of Uniontown, it travels north through Point Marion. The highway leaves Port Marion, crossing Cheat River at its confluence with the Monongahela River. Route 119 then turns toward the east-northeast and heads toward Smithfield. To the northeast of Smithfield, Morgantown Road intersects with Big Six Road, which provides access to PA 43 at exit 8. This begins a section of the highway that runs parallel to two other highways, PA 43 and PA 857, till the PA 857 terminus at the Uniontown bypass in South Union Township.

US 119 merges with US 40 to form part of the George C. Marshall Parkway, which bypasses the city of Uniontown to the west and north. Exits along the US 119 section of the bypass include Walnut Hill Road; McClellandtown Road (PA 21); Main Street (US 40 West and US 40 Bus), the north end of concurrency with US 40; Pittsburgh Street (PA 51); N. Gallatin Avenue; and Connellsville Road. Shortly after the Connellsville Road exit, US 119 passes Penn State Fayette, The Eberly Campus.

Eleven miles northeast of Uniontown and six miles (10 km) north of Pennsylvania State University, US 119 enters the city of Connellsville. Route 119 becomes a one-way pair of 8th and 9th Streets in western Connellsville. After intersection PA 201/PA 711 (West Crawford Avenue), US 119 crosses the Youghiogheny River via the Memorial Bridge, one of two bridges in Connellsville. The highway leaves Connellsville as Memorial Boulevard and heads north intersecting with the southern terminus of PA 982 (Pleasant Valley Road).

North of Pleasant Valley Road is a trumpet interchange with Everson Valley Road. Just north of this intersection, US 119 leaves Fayette County, having spent 38 miles (61 km) in Fayette County.

=== Westmoreland County ===
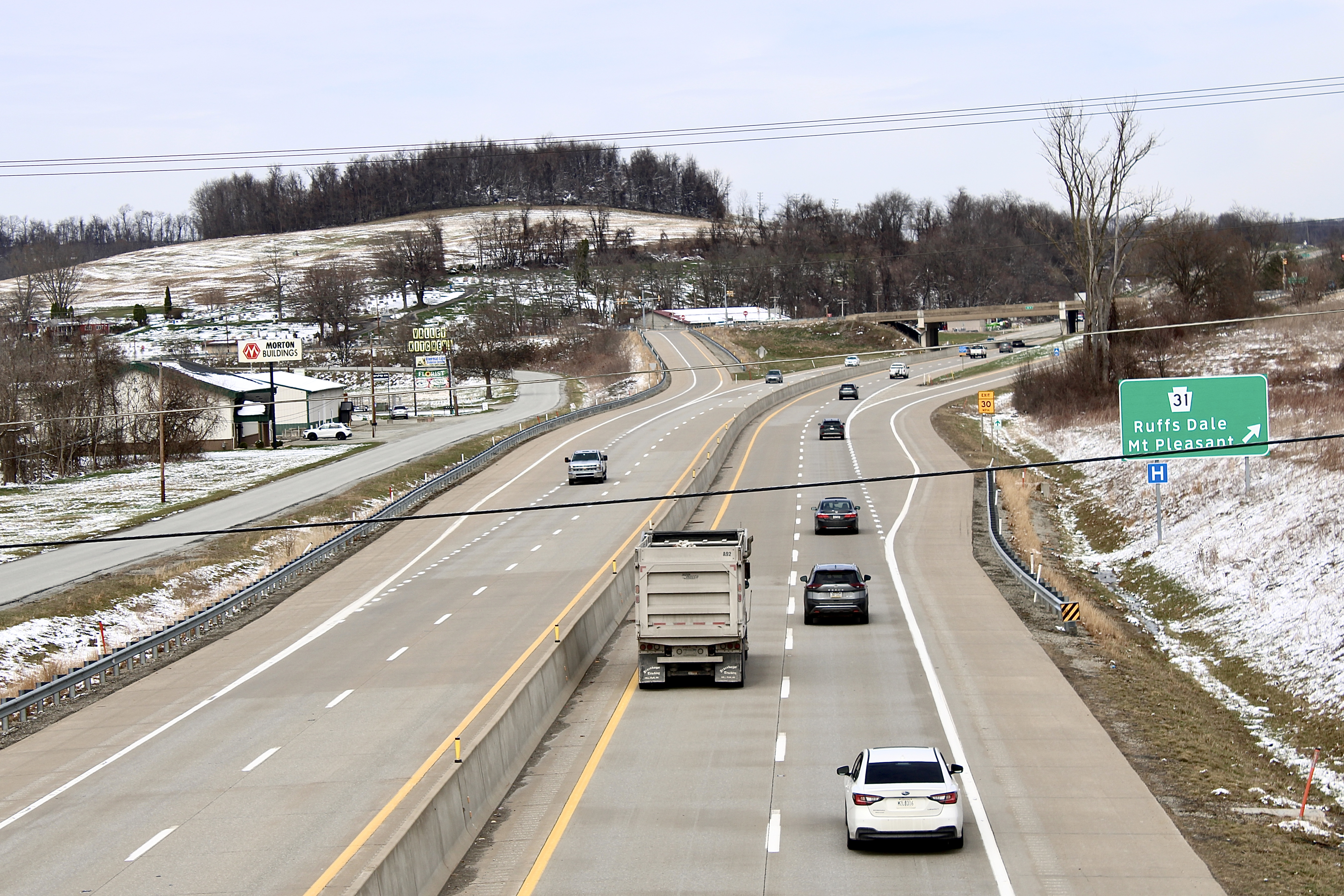
Route 119 North through East Huntingdon Township

The highway enters Westmoreland County in East Huntingdon Township. US 119 continues north between the boroughs of Scottdale and Mount Pleasant. East of Scottdale, US 119 has an exit with PA 819 signed for the two communities, and then west of Mount Pleasant is an interchange with PA 31, which also provides access to PA 981.

Five and a half miles north of Mount Pleasant, just west of Youngwood, US 119 traffic must exit the expressway at a full cloverleaf interchange (straight ahead is the beginning of PA 66 North), immediately to the east of connections to the Pennsylvania Turnpike and I-70. After leaving the expressway, US 119 enters Youngwood as Hellman St., which becomes the one-way pair of 3rd and 4th Sts.

Shortly after leaving Youngwood, US 119 intersects the Lincoln Highway (US 30), which bypasses Greensburg to the west and south. Route 119 becomes Main St. at this point and travels through downtown Greensburg. At PA 130, Pittsburgh St., US 119 turns to the right and leaves Greensburg as Harvey Ave and heads to the northeast toward the historical Hannastown. Once leaving Greensburg US 119 becomes a two-lane road predominantly again for the first time since joining the Uniontown bypass nearly 40 miles (64 km) south.

After passing Hannastown, US 119 continues to the northeast to merge with the William Penn Highway (US 22). The concurrency runs to the east-northeast toward Blairsville where US 119 leaves Westmoreland County after spending 33 miles (53 km) in the county.

=== Indiana County ===
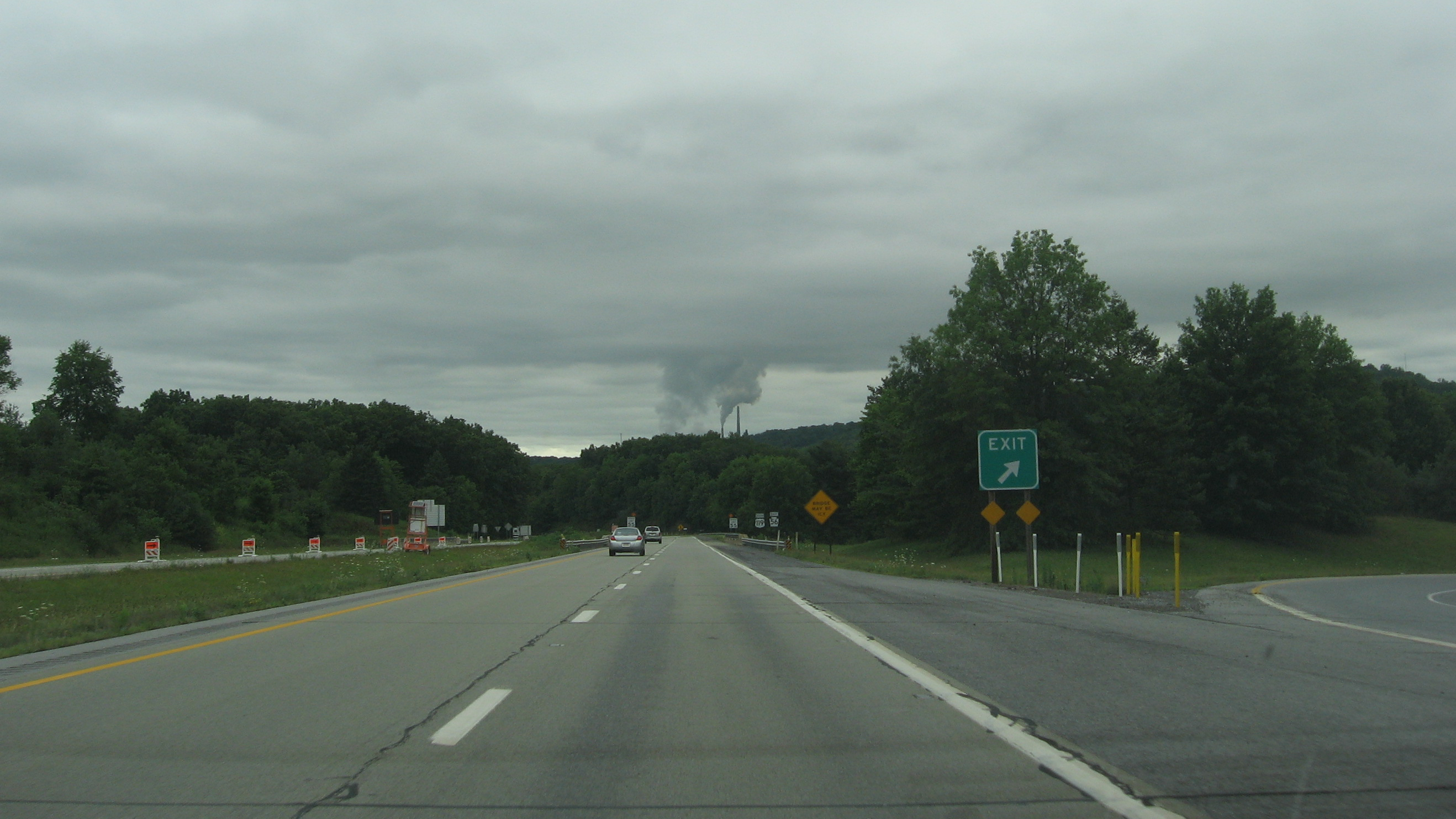
Heading south on US 119, just north of Homer City, Pennsylvania with Homer City Generating Station visible is the distance.

US 119 enters Indiana County in the borough of Blairsville after crossing the Conemaugh River. US 119/US 22 bypasses the borough to the north and heads to the end of the concurrency in Burrell Township. US 119 then takes a more northerly path as the Buffalo-Pittsburgh Highway. While the portion of US 119 between Blairsville and Homer City was a two-lane segment until recent years, this portion of the highway has been widened to four lanes.

Seven miles north of the William Penn Highway, US 119 enters Homer City and merges with PA 56. PA 56 leaves US 119 when the highway intersects the Benjamin Franklin Highway (US 422) south of Indiana. US 119 then becomes an eastern bypass of the borough. The only exit on the bypass is the Philadelphia St. exit at PA 286.

Immediately after passing Indiana, the Buffalo-Pittsburgh Highway becomes a two-lane road again north of an interchange with PA 110 and continues to Home. In Home, US 119 is the eastern terminus of PA 85. US 119 continues north through rural northern Indiana County before leaving the county in North Mahoning Township after travelling 42 miles (68 km) in the county.

=== Jefferson and Clearfield counties ===
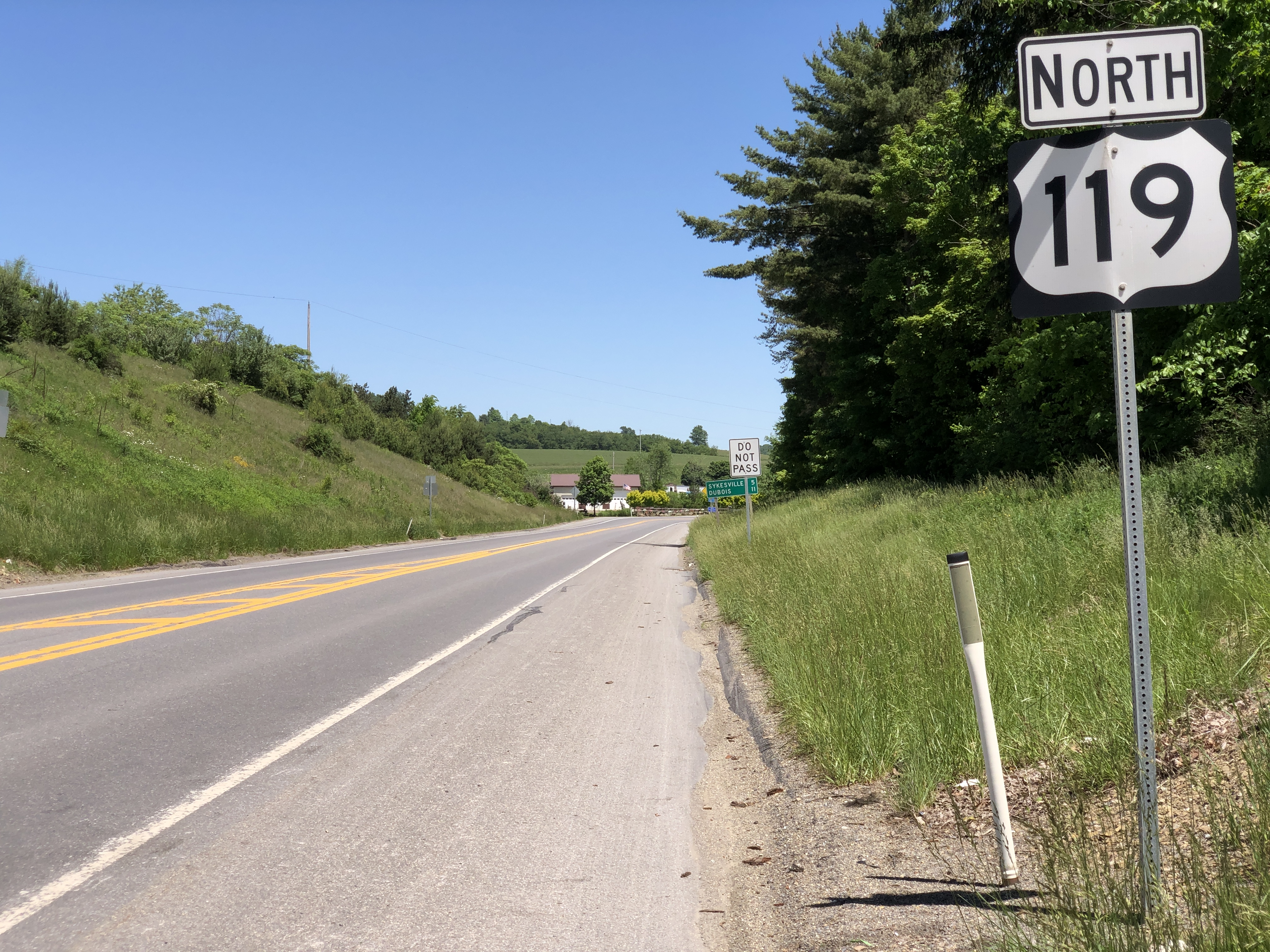
US 119 northbound past PA 410 in Henderson Township

US 119 enters Jefferson County in Young Township. Just north of the Jefferson County border, the Buffalo-Pittsburgh Highway intersects PA 436. After entering Punxsutawney, the home of Punxsutawney Phil, the route merges with PA 36 at Mahoning St. US 119 is concurrent with PA 36 for four blocks before making a left turn on Hampton Ave. Route 119 leaves Punxsutawney shortly thereafter as Ridge Ave. and heads east toward Big Run. Before reaching Big Run, US 119 passes the Punxsutawney Municipal Airport in Bell Township. After passing through Big Run as Main St., the Buffalo-Pittsburgh Highway turns to the north-northeast toward Sykesville, PA.

Shortly after leaving Sykesville, US 119 leaves Jefferson County and enters Clearfield in Sandy Township south of DuBois. After an intersection with US 322, US 119 ends at US 219 just south of DuBois.

US 119 spends 18 miles (29 km) in Jefferson County and less than 3 miles (4.8 km) in Clearfield County.

== History ==
U.S. Route 119 was originally signed in 1926. Until 1927, it ran from West Virginia to New York. Originally, instead of ending at US 219 in Sandy Township, it followed US 219's current alignment for 44 miles (71 km) north to Wilcox. It then followed the present-day PA 321 to Kane where it ran concurrent to US 6 to Smethport, 26 miles (42 km) to the northeast. In Smethport, US 119 travelled the current alignment of PA 46 to Bradford where it turned north to New York state via US 219's current alignment. In 1927, US 119 terminated at its current location south of DuBois.

In the 1940s and 1950s, the highway was widened in several places, the most notable of which include: a 1940 widening from New Stanton to Greensburg; a 1948 widening in Connellsville; a 1956 widening in Uniontown. In 1965, an expressway was completed from PA 819 to PA 31, and in 1966, it was completed from Pennsville to PA 819. This expressway runs between Mount Pleasant and Scottdale.

In 1972, the Uniontown (started in 1971) and Indiana (started in 1969) bypasses were completed. In 1978 an expressway from PA 31 to the PA 66 interchange was completed, which finished the current 11-mile (18 km) expressway from Pennsville to the Pennsylvania Turnpike. In 1993, an expressway from the southern end of the Uniontown bypass to Big Six Road in Georges Township was built parallel to US 119. This is currently part of PA 43 but is the only free section of the Mon–Fayette Expressway. In 2000, US 119 was widened along its concurrency with US 22 in Westmoreland County. Many of the latest improvements have been controversial, but improvements continue to be made.

In 2009, the Pennsylvania Department of Transportation (PennDOT), Pennsylvania Turnpike Commission (PTC), and West Virginia Division of Highways (WVDOH) had planned on submitting an application to the American Association of State Highway and Transportation Officials (AASHTO) on realigning US 119 onto the Mon–Fayette Expressway south of Uniontown all the way to the Mon–Fayette's southern terminus with Interstate 68 near Cheat Lake, West Virginia east of Morgantown, where it would briefly run concurrent with I-68 once the West Virginia section of the Mon–Fayette Expressway opened in 2011. As to where US 119 would leave I-68 was a matter of debate, however, as PennDOT and the PTC preferred that US 119 exit I-68 at Exit 1, completely bypassing Downtown Morgantown, while WVDOH preferred that US 119 exit I-68 sooner at Exit 7 so that US 119 would at least continue to run through Downtown Morgantown. (Both exits are to US 119's existing alignment in the area.) As of February 2014, there has been no response back on the AASHTO, and US 119 remains on its current alignment south of Uniontown.

== Major intersections ==
County	Location	mi	km	Old exit	New exit	Destinations	Notes
Fayette	Point Marion	0.0	0.0			US 119 south (Point Marion Road) – Morgantown	Continuation into West Virginia
Fayette	Point Marion	1.8	2.9			PA 88 north – Monongahela, Pittsburgh	Southern terminus of PA 88
Fayette	Springhill Township	2.0	3.2			PA 166 north – New Geneva	Southern terminus of PA 166
Fayette	South Union Township	15.2	24.5	Southern end of freeway section			
Fayette	South Union Township	15.2	24.5			PA 43 south / PA 857 south (Georges Fairchance Road) – Fairchance, Smithfield, Morgantown	Southern terminus of PA 43 concurrency; northern terminus of PA 857
Fayette	South Union Township	15.4	24.8			US 40 east – Hopwood	Southern terminus of US 40 concurrency
Fayette	South Union Township					Walnut Hill Road	
Fayette	South Union Township	17.4	28.0			PA 21 (McClellandtown Road)	
Fayette	North Union Township	18.3	29.5			US 40 west / US 40 Bus. east (Main Street)	Northern terminus of US 40 concurrency
Fayette	North Union Township	19.2	30.9			PA Turnpike 43 north – Brownsville, Pittsburgh PA 43 ends	Stack interchange; northern terminus of PA 43 concurrency; E-ZPass or toll-by-plate
Fayette	North Union Township	19.2	30.9			PA 51 (Pittsburgh Street)	
Fayette	North Union Township					Gallatin Avenue	
Fayette	North Union Township					Connellsville Street	
Fayette	North Union Township			Northern end of freeway section			
Fayette	Connellsville	30.2	48.6			PA 711 north (Crawford Avenue) PA 711 Truck begins	Southern terminus of PA 711 Truck concurrency
Fayette	Connellsville	30.2	48.6			PA 201 north (Vanderbilt Road) – Leisenring, Vanderbilt	
Fayette	Connellsville					PA 711 Truck north (Crawford Avenue)	Southern terminus of PA 711 Truck concurrency
Fayette	Bullskin Township	33.7	54.2			PA 982 north (Pleasant Valley Road) – Laurelville, Donegal	Southern terminus of PA 982
Fayette	Bullskin Township			Southern end of limited-access section			
Westmoreland	East Huntingdon Township	38.5	62.0			PA 819 – Scottdale	
Westmoreland	Mt. Pleasant	40.7	65.5			PA 31 – Ruffs Dale, Mt. Pleasant	
Westmoreland	East Huntingdon Township					West Tech Drive	
Westmoreland	Hempfield Township					Technology Drive	
Westmoreland	New Stanton	46.1	74.2			PA Turnpike 66 north to I-70 / I-76 Toll / Penna Turnpike – New Stanton, Delmont	Southern terminus and exit 0A on PA 66; access to I-70/I-76 via SR 3091
Westmoreland	New Stanton	46.1	74.2	Northern end of limited-access section			
Westmoreland	South Greensburg	50.0	80.5			PA 819 south (Huff Avenue)	Southern terminus of PA 819 concurrency
Westmoreland	Southwest Greensburg	50.9	81.9			US 30 to PA Turnpike 66 – Pittsburgh PA 66 Bus. begins	Interchange; southern terminus of PA 66 Bus. concurrency
Westmoreland	Greensburg	52.5	84.5			PA 130 east (West Pittsburgh Street)	Northern terminus of PA 66 Bus. concurrency northbound, southern terminus of PA 130 concurrency northbound
Westmoreland	Greensburg	52.5	84.5			PA 66 Bus. north / PA 130 west (North Main Street) to US 30 west	Northern terminus of PA 66 Bus. concurrency southbound; southern terminus of PA 130 concurrency southbound
Westmoreland	Greensburg					PA 130 east (East Pittsburgh Street / East Otterman Street) to US 30 east	Northern terminus of PA 130 concurrency
Westmoreland	Greensburg	52.7	84.8			PA 819 north (Harvey Avenue)	Northern terminus of PA 819 concurrency
Westmoreland	Salem Township	61.4	98.8			US 22 west (William Penn Highway) – Delmont	Southern terminus of US 22 concurrency
Westmoreland	New Alexandria	62.4	100.4			PA 981 (Latrobe New Alexandria Road) – Latrobe, Saltsburg	
Westmoreland	Derry Township	66.9	107.7			PA 982 south – Derry	Northern terminus of PA 982
Indiana	Blairsville	71.2	114.6			PA 217 – Blairsville, Derry	Interchange
Indiana	Burrell Township	73.9	118.9			US 22 east – Ebensburg	Interchange; northern terminus of US 22 concurrency
Indiana	White Township	81.7	131.5			PA 56 east – Armagh, Johnstown	Southern terminus of PA 56 concurrency
Indiana	White Township			Southern end of freeway section			
Indiana	White Township					US 422 Bus. west (Wayne Avenue)	Access to Indiana University of Pennsylvania
Indiana	White Township	85.1	137.0		A	US 422 east – Ebensburg	
Indiana	White Township	85.1	137.0		B	US 422 west / PA 56 west / PA 286 Truck west – Kittanning	Northern terminus of PA 56 concurrency; southern terminus of Truck PA 286 concurrency
Indiana	White Township	88.8	142.9			PA 286 Truck east to PA 286 – Indiana, Clymer	Northern terminus of PA 286 Truck concurrency; access to Jimmy Stewart Airport and Indiana University of Pennsylvania
Indiana	White Township					PA 110 west – Creekside	Eastern terminus of PA 110
Indiana	White Township			Northern end of freeway section			
Indiana	Rayne Township	97.4	156.8			PA 85 west – Plumville	Eastern terminus of PA 85
Indiana	Marion Center					PA 403 south – Marion Center	Northern terminus of PA 403
Indiana	North Mahoning Township	111.5	179.4			PA 210 south – Trade City, Smicksburg, Plumville	Northern terminus of PA 210
Jefferson	Young Township	113.1	182.0			PA 436 north to PA 36 north – Brookville	Southern terminus of PA 436
Jefferson	Punxsutawney	115.0	185.1			PA 36 west (West Mahoning Street) – Brookville	Southern terminus of PA 36 concurrency
Jefferson	Punxsutawney	115.3	185.6			PA 36 east (East Mahoning Street) – McGees Mills	Northern terminus of PA 36 concurrency
Jefferson	Punxsutawney	115.8	186.4			PA 310 north – Reynoldsville	Southern terminus of PA 310
Jefferson	Henderson Township	123.7	199.1			PA 410 east – Troutville, Luthersburg	Western terminus of PA 410
Clearfield	Sandy Township	131.8	212.1			US 322 (Behringer Highway) – Brookville, Clearfield	
Clearfield	Sandy Township	132.9	213.9			US 219 (Watson Highway) – DuBois, Ebensburg	Northern terminus of US 119
1.000 mi = 1.609 km; 1.000 km = 0.621 mi: Concurrency terminus; Electronic toll collection
