= Great Crossings Bridge =

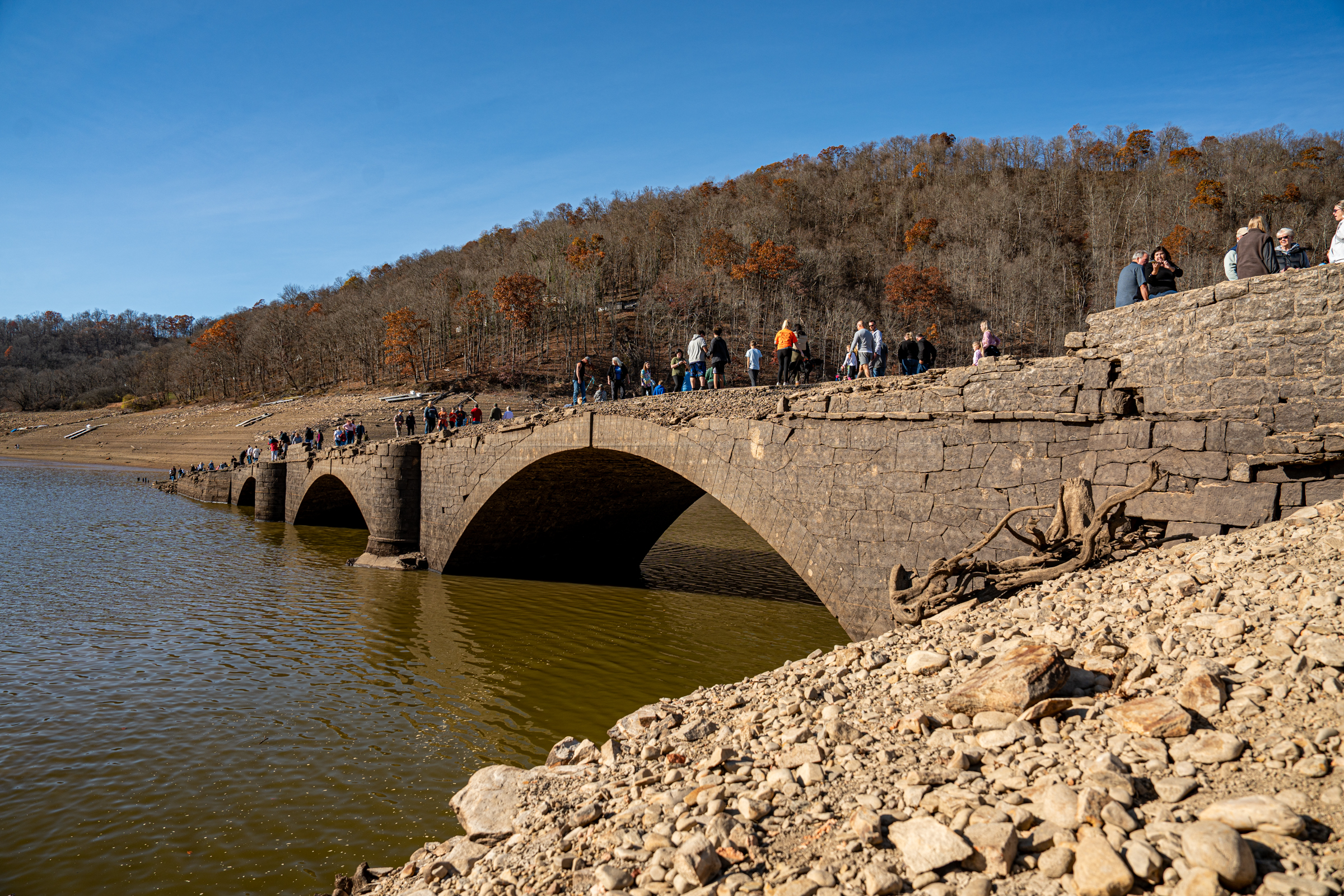
- Coordinates: 39°45′19″N 79°23′48″W
- Crosses: Youghiogheny River
- Locale: Confluence, Pennsylvania, U.S.

Characteristics
- Design: Stone arch bridge
- Total length: 375 ft (114 m)
- Width: 30 ft (9 m)
- Height: 40 ft (12 m)

History
- Construction start: 1815
- Opened: 4 July 1818

Location
- Interactive map of Great Crossings Bridge

The Great Crossings Bridge is a masonry bridge on the National Road between Somerset County and Fayette County, Pennsylvania. It crosses the Youghiogheny River near Confluence, Pennsylvania. The bridge was submerged in 1940 to make way for a reservoir, although it occasionally reappears during periods of drought.

== History and architectural features ==
Built near a ford in use by Europeans since George Washington's 1753 journey to Fort LeBoeuf, the 375-foot-long (114 m), 40-foot-high (12 m), 30-foot-wide (9.1 m) sandstone bridge with three arches was erected between 1813 and 1818 by James Kinkead, James Beck, and Evan Evans and was dedicated on July 4, 1818, at an event attended by President James Monroe.

The town of Somerfield, Pennsylvania, which was originally named Smythfield, was built at the eastern end of the bridge in 1817. The bridge and town were later inundated by Youghiogheny River Lake, a reservoir that began filling in 1940.

The bridge remains standing in the reservoir, just downstream from the present U.S. Route 40 bridge. The bridge is normally submerged year-round, but is occasionally accessible during periods of drought when the water level in the lake drops significantly. While the normal low-water mark during winter is at an elevation of 1,419 feet (433 m), the top of the bridge is visible at 1,392 feet (424 m), and the deck is exposed at 1,384 feet (422 m).

In November 2024, a drought completely exposed the Great Crossings Bridge as well as the remains of the city of Somerville. Over 10,000 people have visited the location since the bridge was exposed.
