= Sang Run, Maryland =

Unincorporated community in Maryland, United States

- Unincorporated community
- Location within Maryland
- Coordinates: 39°34′05″N 79°25′21″W
- Country: United States
- State: Maryland
- County: Garrett
- Elevation: 2,011 ft (613 m)
- Time zone: UTC-5 (Eastern (EST))
  - Summer (DST): UTC-4 (EDT)
- Area codes: 301, 240
- GNIS feature ID: 587219

Sang Run is an unincorporated community in Garrett County, Maryland, United States. Sang Run is located along the Youghiogheny River, 6.9 miles (11.1 km) southwest of Accident.
