= Sutersville, Pennsylvania =

Borough in Pennsylvania, US

- Borough
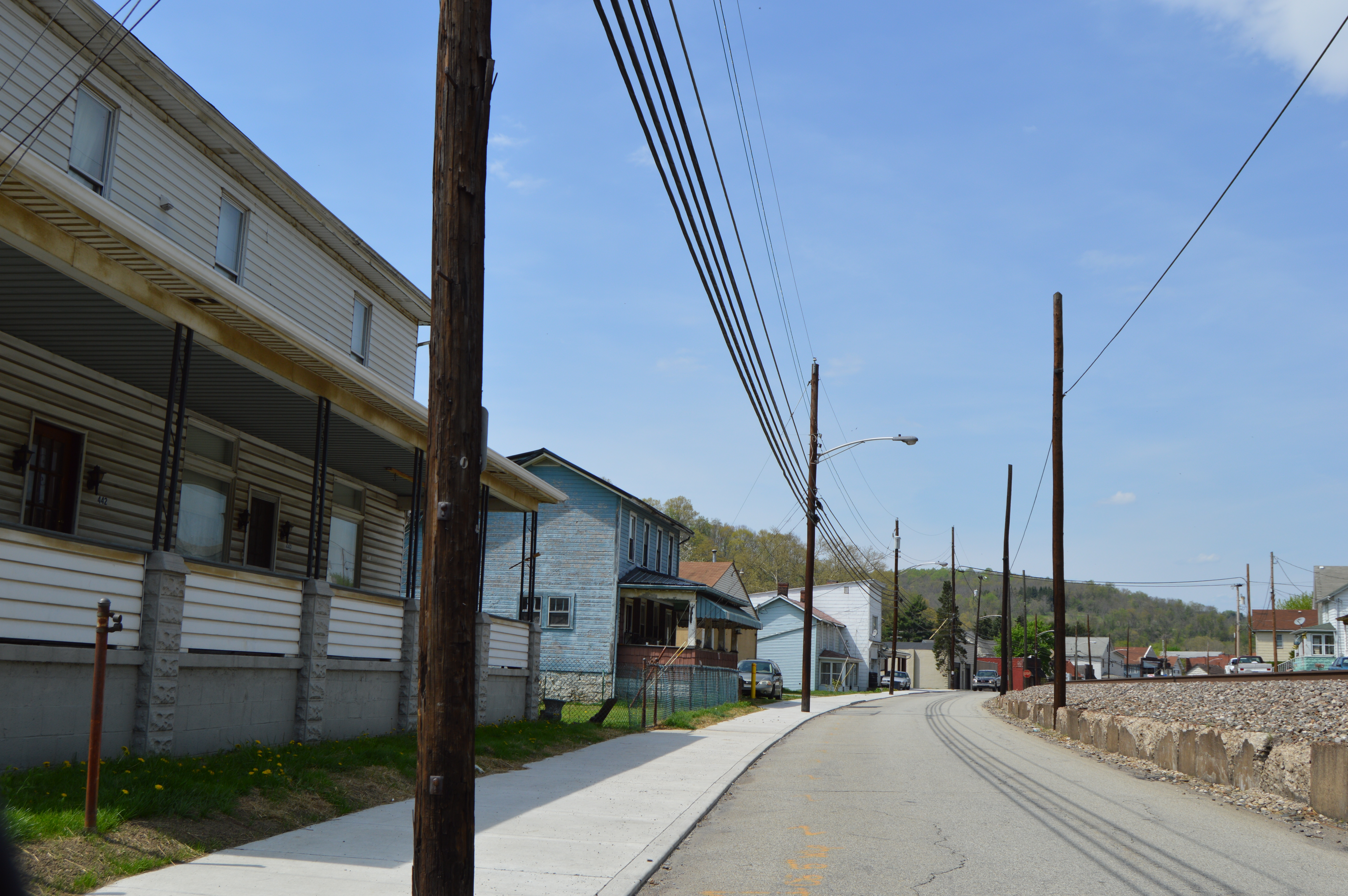
- Houses on Second Avenue

- Location of Sutersville in Westmoreland County, Pennsylvania.

- Location within Pennsylvania
- Coordinates: 40°14′09″N 79°48′14″W
- Country: United States
- State: Pennsylvania
- County: Westmoreland
- Settled: 1867
- Incorporated: 1902

Government
  - Type: Borough Council

Area
  - Total: 0.31 sq mi (0.79 km^{2})
  - Land: 0.27 sq mi (0.70 km^{2})
  - Water: 0.031 sq mi (0.08 km^{2})
- Elevation: 941 ft (287 m)

Population (2020)
  - Total: 561
  - Density: 2,064.6/sq mi (797.16/km^{2})
- Time zone: UTC-5 (Eastern (EST))
  - Summer (DST): UTC-4 (EDT)
- Zip code: 15083
- Area code: 724
- FIPS code: 42-75584

Sutersville is a borough in Westmoreland County, Pennsylvania, United States. As of the 2020 census, Sutersville had a population of 561.

== Geography ==
Sutersville is located at 40°14′9″N 79°48′14″W (40.235910, -79.803777).

According to the United States Census Bureau, the borough has a total area of 0.3 square miles (0.78 km^{2}), of which 0.3 square miles (0.78 km^{2}) is land and 0.04 square miles (0.10 km^{2}) (6.25%) is water.

== Surrounding and adjacent neighborhoods ==
Sutersville is bordered by land to the north, south and east by Sewickley Township. Across the Youghiogheny River to the west, Sutersville runs adjacent with Elizabeth Township in Allegheny County.

== Demographics ==
Historical population
Census	Pop.	Note	%±
1880	490		—
1890	812		65.7%
1910	917		—
1920	914		−0.3%
1930	918		0.4%
1940	937		2.1%
1950	854		−8.9%
1960	964		12.9%
1970	830		−13.9%
1980	863		4.0%
1990	744		−13.8%
2000	636		−14.5%
2010	605		−4.9%
2020	561		−7.3%
U.S. Decennial Census

As of the census of 2000, there were 636 people, 267 households, and 182 families living in the borough. The population density was 2,184.0 inhabitants per square mile (843.2/km^{2}). There were 277 housing units at an average density of 951.2 per square mile (367.3/km^{2}). The racial makeup of the borough was 99.53% White, 0.31% African American, and 0.16% from two or more races. Hispanic or Latino of any race were 0.16% of the population.

There were 267 households, out of which 25.8% had children under the age of 18 living with them, 52.8% were married couples living together, 10.5% had a female householder with no husband present, and 31.8% were non-families. 28.8% of all households were made up of individuals, and 16.9% had someone living alone who was 65 years of age or older. The average household size was 2.38 and the average family size was 2.92.

In the borough the population was spread out, with 19.8% under the age of 18, 5.7% from 18 to 24, 28.8% from 25 to 44, 22.6% from 45 to 64, and 23.1% who were 65 years of age or older. The median age was 41 years. For every 100 females there were 93.9 males. For every 100 females age 18 and over, there were 86.8 males.

The median income for a household in the borough was $30,066, and the median income for a family was $33,750. Males had a median income of $31,000 versus $21,125 for females. The per capita income for the borough was $13,853. About 9.0% of families and 10.5% of the population were below the poverty line, including 15.0% of those under age 18 and 7.7% of those age 65 or over.
