= Pennsylvania Route 981 =

State highway in Westmoreland County, Pennsylvania, US

Pennsylvania Route 981

Route information
- Maintained by PennDOT
- Length: 50.483 mi (81.245 km)

Major junctions
- South end: PA 51 at Rostraver Township
- US 30 near Lawson Heights; US 22 / US 119 near New Alexandria
- North end: PA 819 near Salina

Location
- Country: United States
- State: Pennsylvania
- Counties: Westmoreland

Highway system
- Pennsylvania State Route System; Interstate; US; State; Scenic; Legislative
← PA 980	→ PA 982

Pennsylvania Route 981 (PA 981) is a state highway which runs 50.4 miles (81.1 km) across Westmoreland County, in southwestern Pennsylvania, United States. The highway begins at PA 51 in Rostraver Township, Pennsylvania, and runs northward across Westmoreland County, passing through the towns of Mount Pleasant, Latrobe, and New Alexandria before ending at PA 819 in Salina.

== Route description ==
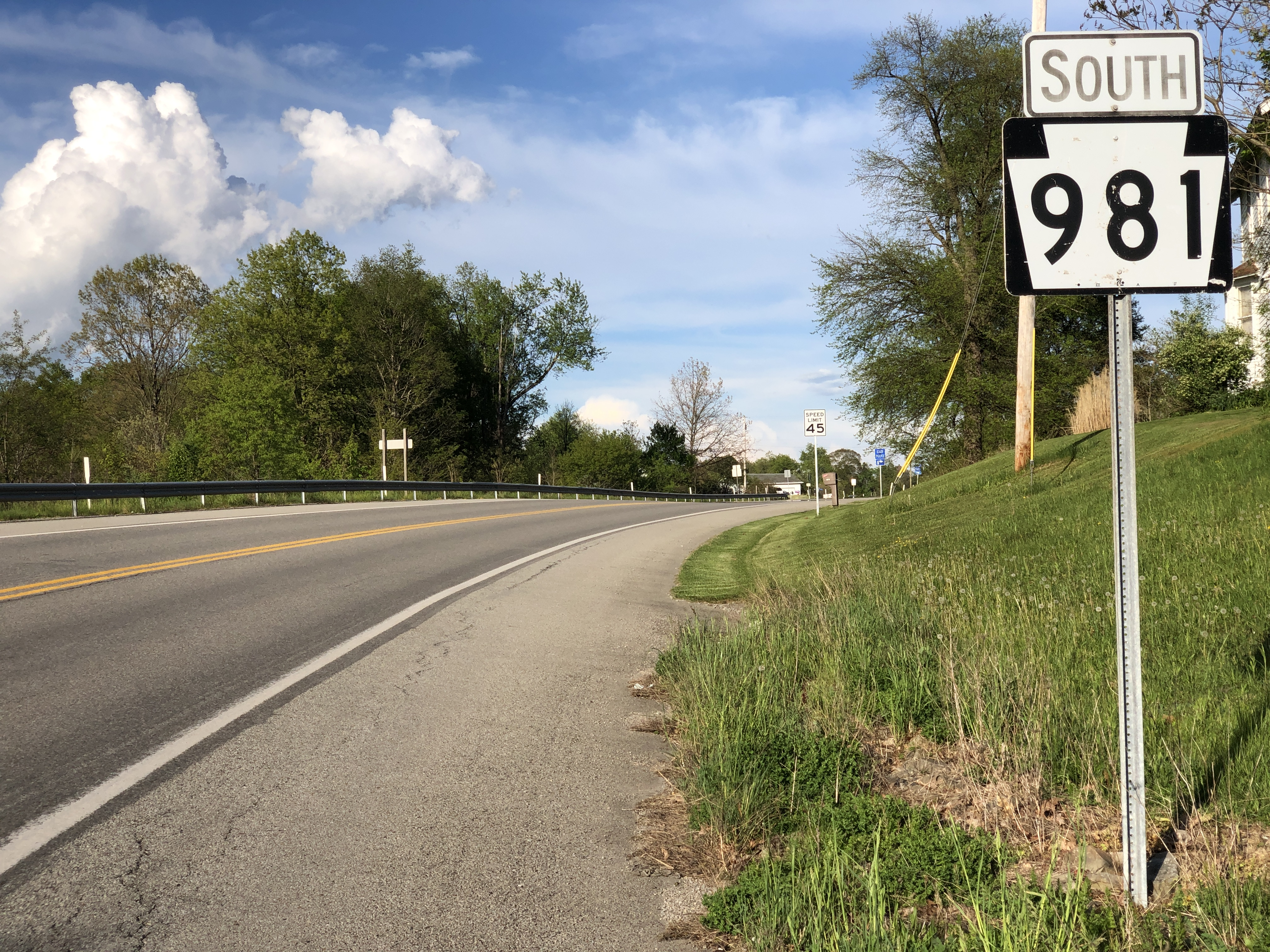
PA 981 southbound in Bell Township

PA 981 begins at PA 51 in Rostraver Township. From Rostraver, the route runs eastward to the borough of Mount Pleasant, where it meets PA 31. PA 981 then turns northward, meeting US 30 outside the city of Latrobe, near the Arnold Palmer Regional Airport. The route then continues northward through Latrobe, passing by Saint Vincent College in Latrobe. Continuing northward, PA 981 meets US 119 and US 22 at the borough of New Alexandria. The route then ends at PA 819 near Salina.

== History ==
PA 981 previously ended at PA 156, but was extended in 1998 to its current terminus at PA 819.

PennDOT began construction in 2006 to improve the intersection between PA 981 and US 30 near Latrobe.

In 2021, A petition to rename a section of Pennsylvania Route 981 as Honorable Mike Reese Memorial Highway from Kecksburg Road in Mount Pleasant Township Pennsylvania, to Pennsylvania Route 819 in Mount Pleasant Township was approved by the state legislature and became official on August 11, 2021, in a special ceremony dedicated to honor the late Pennsylvania State Representative Mike Reese.

== Major intersections ==
The entire route is in Westmoreland County.

Location	mi	km	Destinations	Notes
Rostraver Township	0.000	0.000	PA 51 – Uniontown, Pittsburgh	Southern terminus
Youghiogheny River	1.594– 1.656	2.565– 2.665	Smithton Low-Level Bridge	
Mount Pleasant	13.819	22.240	PA 31 west (West Main Street)	South end of PA 31 overlap
Mount Pleasant	14.187	22.832	PA 31 east (West Main Street)	North end of PA 31 overlap
Mount Pleasant Township	15.356	24.713	PA 819	
Unity Township	23.061	37.113	PA 130 west (Main Street)	South end of PA 130 overlap
Unity Township	23.540	37.884	PA 130 east – Lycippus	North end of PA 130 overlap
Unity Township	28.273	45.501	US 30 (Lincoln Highway) – Greensburg, Ligonier	
Derry Township	38.169	61.427	US 22 / US 119 (William Penn Highway) – Pittsburgh, Ebensburg	
Loyalhanna Township	45.892	73.856	PA 286 east (Washington Street) – Saltsburg	South end of PA 286 overlap
Loyalhanna Township	46.090	74.175	PA 286 west (Waukeena Road)	North end of PA 286 overlap
Bell Township	48.594	78.204	PA 156 north – Avonmore	Southern terminus of PA 156
Bell Township	50.483	81.245	PA 819 – Slickville, Apollo	Northern terminus
1.000 mi = 1.609 km; 1.000 km = 0.621 mi: Concurrency terminus
