= Ohiopyle State Park =

State park in Fayette County, Pennsylvania, United States

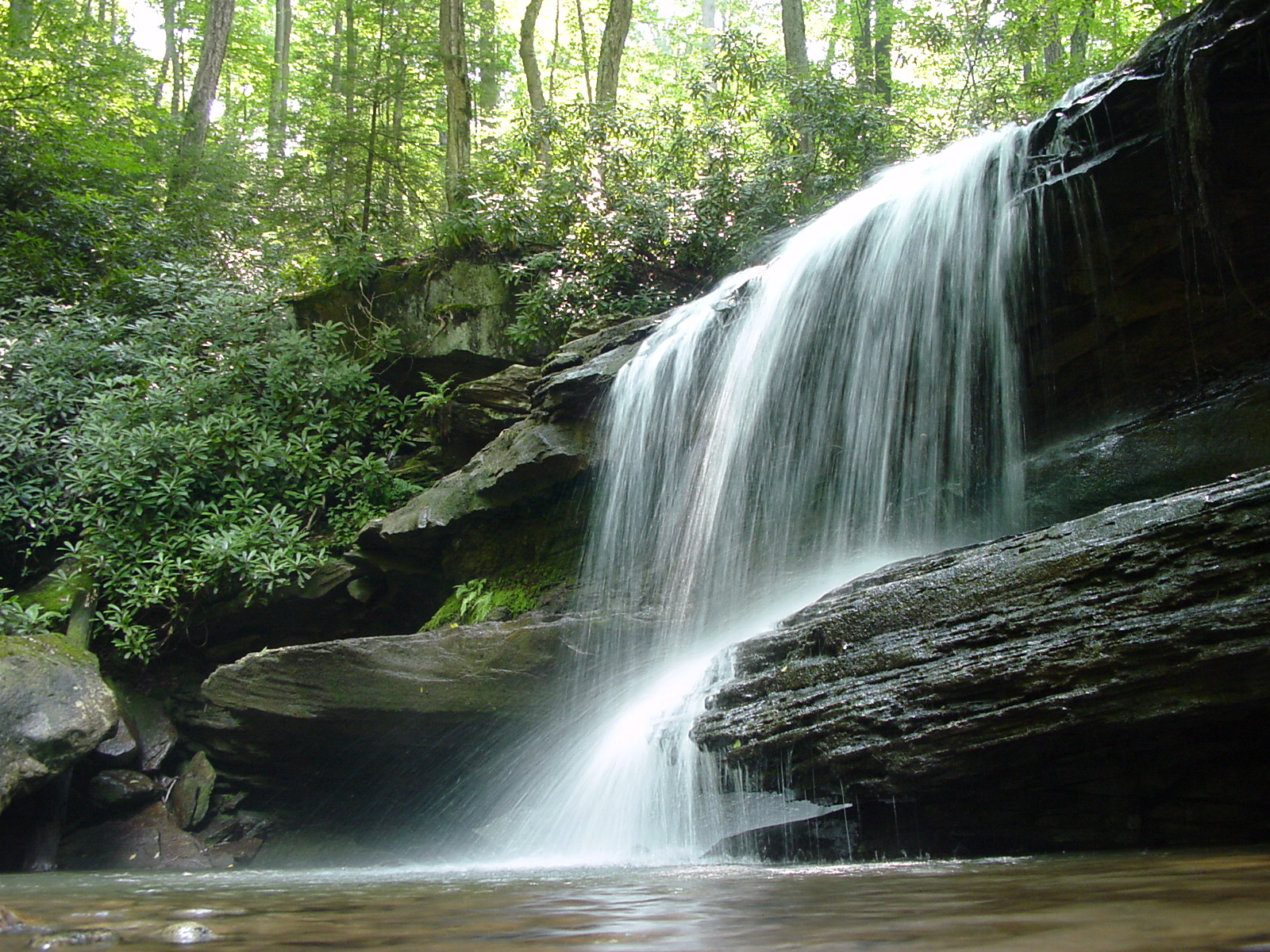
- Jonathan Run Falls

- Location within Pennsylvania Location within the United States
- Interactive map of Ohiopyle State Park
- Location: Fayette County, Pennsylvania, United States
- Coordinates: 39°52′05″N 79°29′39″W
- Area: 20,500 acres (8,300 ha)
- Elevation: 2,259 feet (689 m)
- Established: 1965
- Administrator: Pennsylvania Department of Conservation and Natural Resources
- Website: Official website
- Pennsylvania State Parks

Ohiopyle State Park is a Pennsylvania state park situated on 20,500 acres (8,300 ha) between Chestnut Ridge and Laurel Hill in Dunbar, Henry Clay, and Stewart Townships, Fayette County, Pennsylvania, in the United States. The focal point of the park is the more than 14 miles (23 km) of the Youghiogheny River gorge that passes through the park. The river provides whitewater boating, recreational fishing, and kayaking. Ohiopyle State Park is bisected by Pennsylvania Route 381 south of the Pennsylvania Turnpike. The park opened to the public in 1965 but was not officially dedicated until 1971.

Ohiopyle State Park was chosen by the Pennsylvania Department of Conservation and Natural Resources (DCNR) and its Bureau of Parks as one of "25 Must-See Pennsylvania State Parks".

== History ==
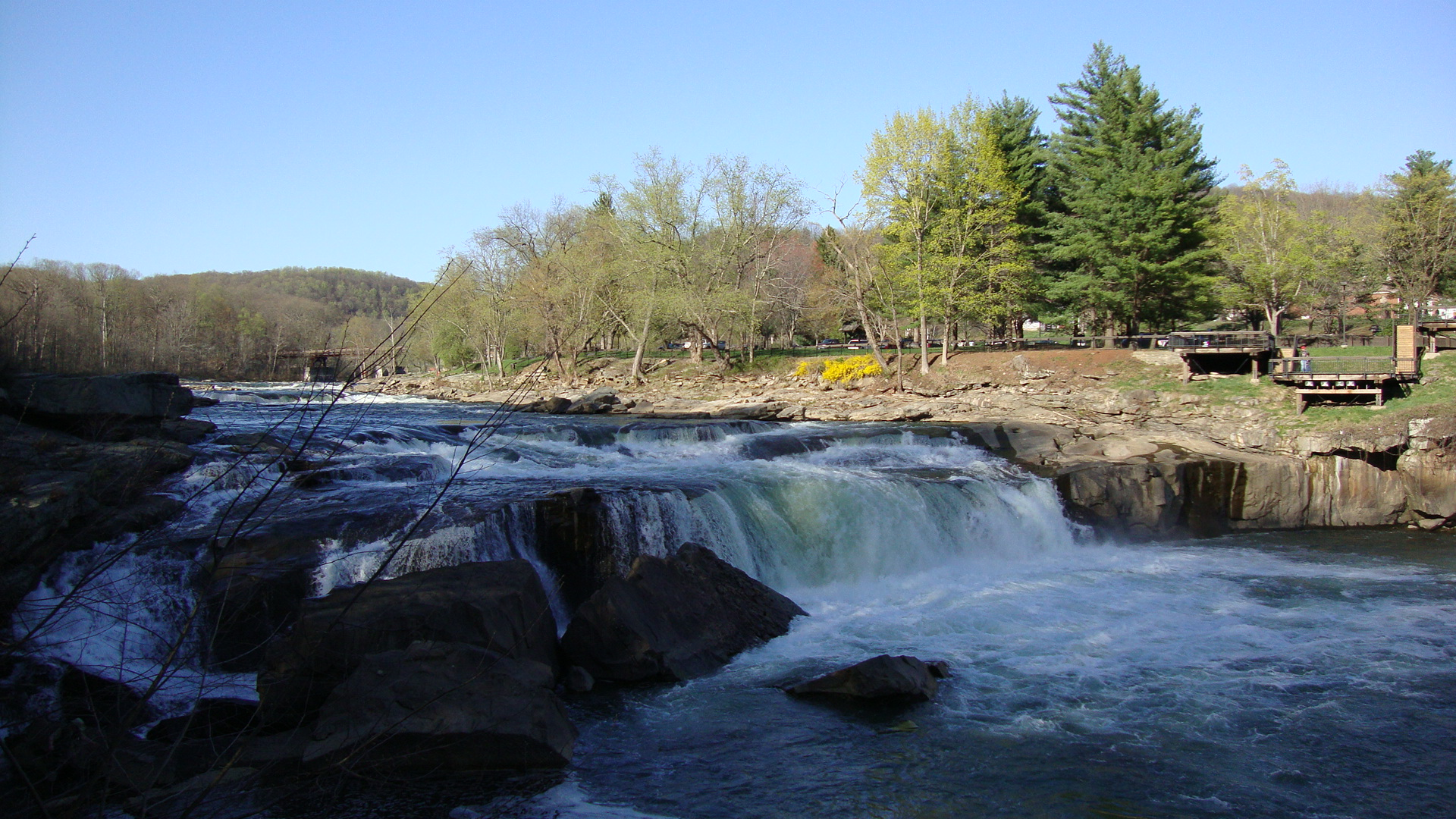
Ohiopyle Falls on the Youghiogheny River

The park lies in the Appalachian mixed mesophytic forests ecoregion.

=== Waterfalls ===
Ohiopyle State Park features several waterfalls.

- Ohiopyle Falls is a 20-foot (6.1 m) waterfall that spans the Youghiogheny River and is surrounded by the Falls Day Use Area located at the center of the park.
- Cucumber Falls is a 36-foot (11 m) bridal veil waterfall on Cucumber Run, a small creek that flows into the Youghiogheny River. It can be reached from Meadow Run Trail.
- Cascades is a woodland waterfall that is near the park office and is very popular with anglers.
- Jonathan Run Falls is a series of rhododendron-lined waterfalls on Jonathan Run that can be seen by hiking on Jonathan Run Trail.
- Sugar Run Falls is a waterfall on Sugar Run that is accessible from a walking trail that spurs off of the Great Allegheny Passage.
- Meadow Run Waterslides has unique geologic formations for exploration. There are ripples and potholes that have been carved into the stone by years and years of powerful currents and spinning rocks. Visitors to the park are permitted to ride these natural waterslides.

=== Ferncliff Peninsula National Natural Landmark ===
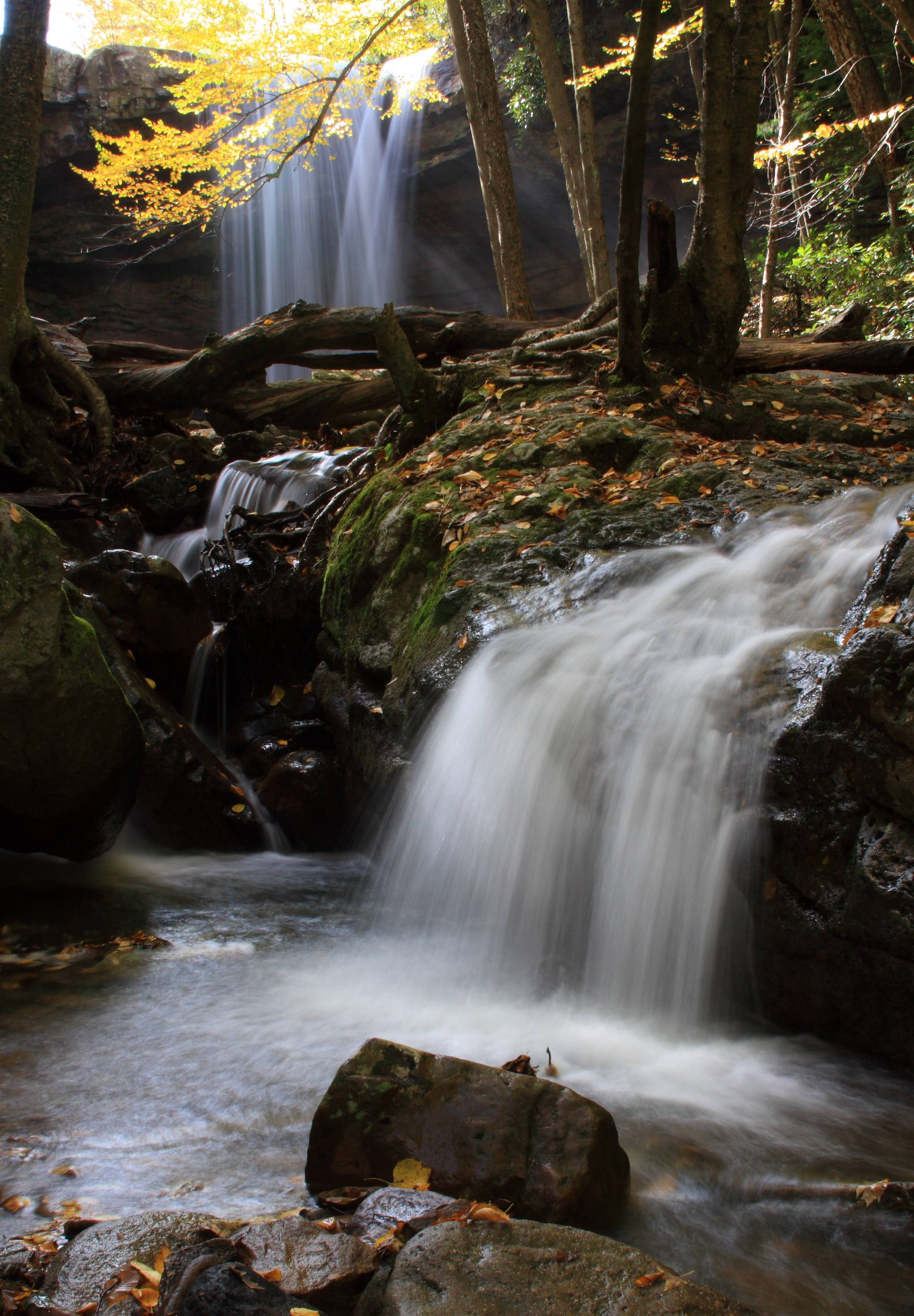
Cucumber Falls

Ferncliff Peninsula is a 100-acre (40 ha) peninsula in the Youghiogheny River inside the park. Due to the warmer microclimate inside the gorge, seeds carried by the river from the south survive. It was declared a National Natural Landmark in November 1973 and was named a State Park Natural Area in 1992.

The first known group of people to inhabit the Ohiopyle area were the Monongahela, a clan of the mound builders. These Native Americans disappeared from the scene just as European colonists began to arrive in North America. As the east coast was being settled, Native Americans who had lived closer to the Atlantic Ocean were exterminated or forced to flee to the west.

Various tribes, including the Shawnee, Lenni Lenape, and Seneca people, inhabited the Ohiopyle area during the 18th century but were ultimately removed after the French and Indian War. One of the few remnants of American Indian culture in the area is the name. "Ohiopyle" is derived from the Lenape phrase ahi opihəle, which means 'it turns very white', referring to the frothy waterfalls.

Baughman's Rock Overlook timelapse

The earliest European settlers to the Ohiopyle area were farmers, trappers, and hunters. The population of the area expanded after the building of the National Road in 1811 that passed near Ohiopyle. This road made the area more accessible and connected it to the eastern markets. Lumbering became the dominant industry. Smaller industries in the area included cooperages, tanneries, salt mining, and coal mining.

The construction of the Baltimore and Ohio Railroad and the Western Maryland Railroad greatly accelerated the progress of the lumbering operations in Ohiopyle. Both railroads had stations in the borough. Several narrow-gauge railroads were built up into the surrounding mountains. These smaller railways were able to efficiently transport the lumber to the sawmills and rail stations of Ohiopyle.

The railroads also brought tourists to Ohiopyle. The round trip ride from Pittsburgh to Ohiopyle was one dollar. Tourists flocked to the area to see the waterfalls and stay at the resorts that quickly sprouted up along the Youghiogheny River. The resorts had boardwalks, dancing pavilions, bowling alleys, fountains, tennis courts, and hiking trails. The rise of the automobile caused the end of the resorts at Ohiopyle. The buildings were torn down, and the forests were allowed to regrow. The Western Pennsylvania Conservancy purchased the land and then sold it to the Commonwealth of Pennsylvania. It was the first and largest park acquired under the Project 70 Land Acquisition and Borrowing Act, with the governor approving the acquisition on August 8, 1964. Ohiopyle State Park was opened to the public in 1965 and was formally dedicated on May 28, 1971.

== Recreation ==
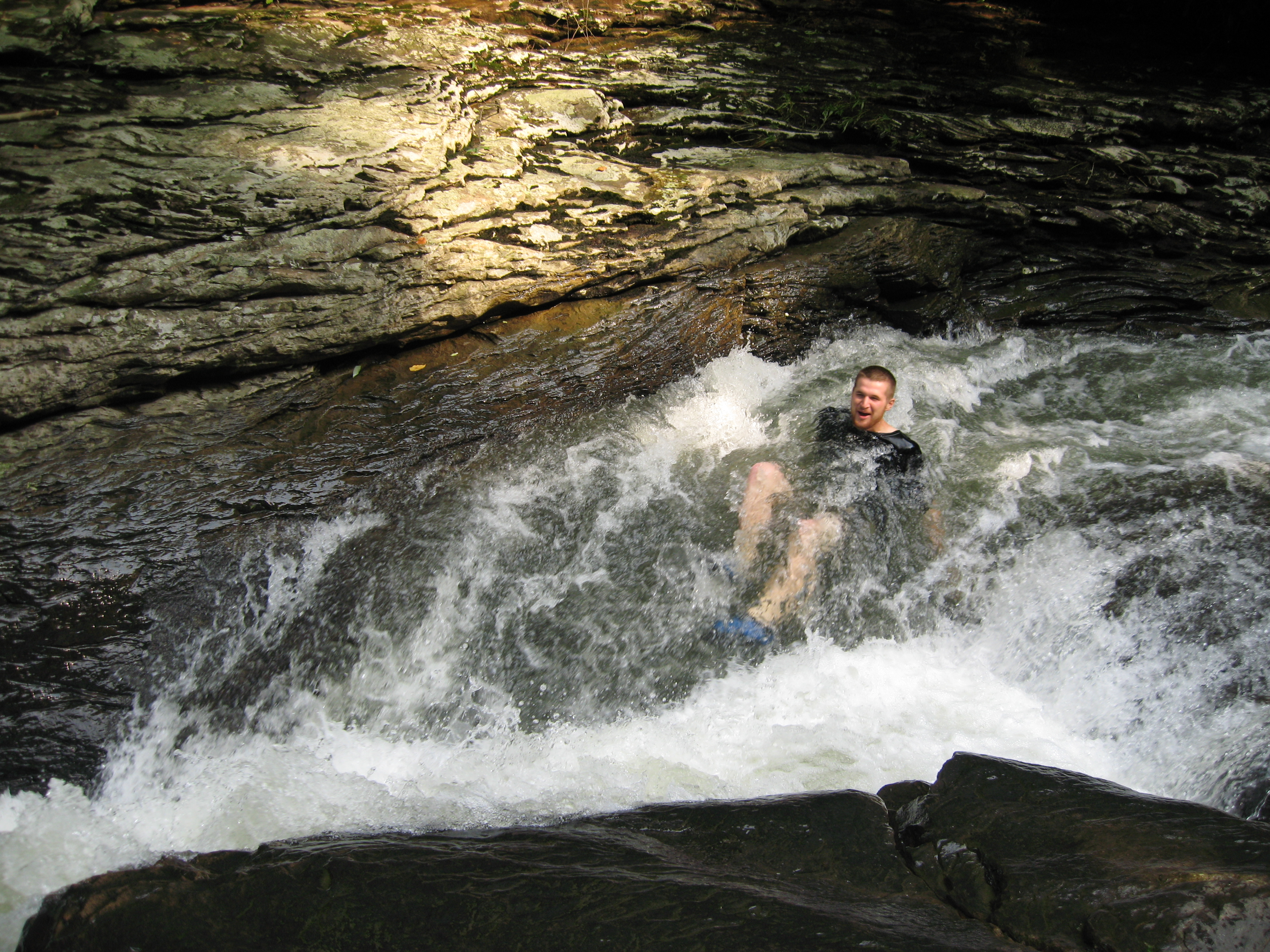
A visitor rides a natural waterslide at Meadow Run

A group of visitors prepare to run the Lower Yough just below Ohiopyle Falls

Ohiopyle State Park is a popular destination for rafting, kayaking, and canoeing, but it also has over 100 miles (160 km) of trails that are open to hiking, horseback riding, cross-country skiing, mountain bikes, and snowmobiles. The trails pass by several of the park's waterfalls and ascend the mountains to scenic overlooks.

=== Whitewater paddling ===
The Youghiogheny River is the busiest section of whitewater east of the Mississippi River. The Lower Yough, a 7-mile (11 km) run, begins at Ohiopyle Falls and ends at the Bruner Run take-out. The Middle Yough begins at the Ramcat put-in near Confluence and ends just above the falls in Ohiopyle. One weekend per year or so, there is a race and festival devoted to the falls, and the state park permits paddlers to run the falls. Only rubber rafts, closed-top canoes, and kayaks are permitted in the river. All visitors must wear life jackets certified by the United States Coast Guard. The Lower Yough River is rated Class III to Class IV on the International Scale of River Difficulty, depending on water conditions; the easier Middle Yough is rated II, and Ohiopyle Falls is rated IV. Boating must be in accordance with the Safety Code of American Whitewater. Inexperienced visitors are encouraged to hire one of the several private outfitters that offer guided trips down the rapids.

=== Trails ===
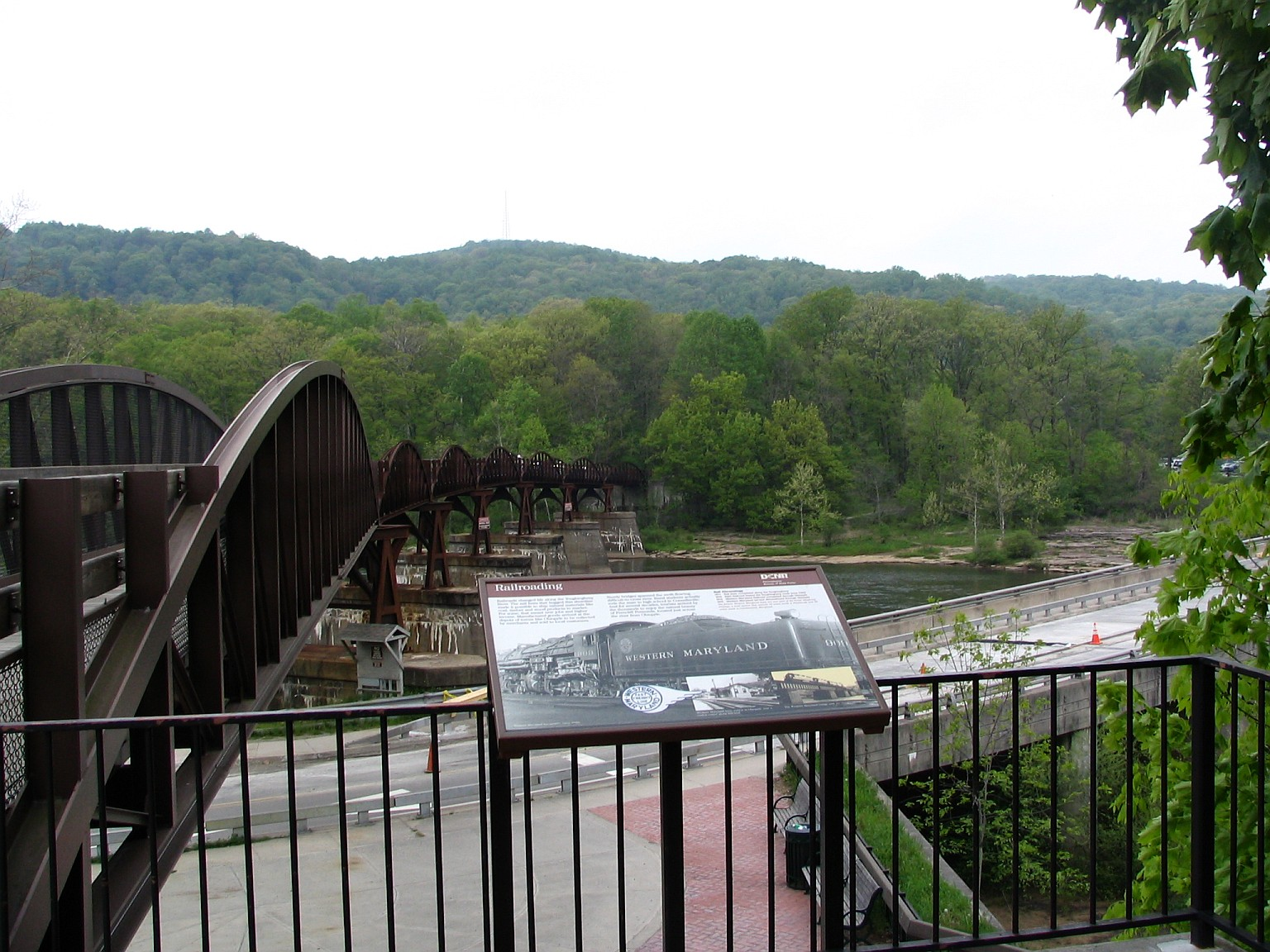
Ohiopyle Trestle, part of the Great Allegheny Passage

Ohiopyle State Park is connected end-to-end by the Youghiogheny River Trail South section of the Great Allegheny Passage, part of a 318-mile (512 km) system of off-road long-distance trails for hiking and biking between Pittsburgh, Pennsylvania, and Washington, D.C.

This rail-trail parallels the rapids from Ramcat to the Bruner Run take-out on either end of the park and crosses over the "Loop" near the falls at Ohiopyle on a high trestle. The trail system connects to a wide network of rustic hiking and equestrian trails, including the Appalachian Trail in Maryland. A network of hiking trails exists within the park itself. The Laurel Highlands Hiking Trail, part of the larger Potomac Heritage National Scenic Trail, has its southern terminus at Ohiopyle State Park.

=== Hunting and fishing ===
Hunting is permitted on 18,000 acres (7,300 ha) of Ohiopyle State Park. Hunters are expected to follow the rules and regulations of the Pennsylvania Game Commission. The common game species are ruffed grouse, eastern gray squirrel, wild turkey, American black bear, white-tailed deer, and eastern cottontail rabbits. Hunting of groundhogs is prohibited. Loaded firearms are not permitted within 50 feet (15 m) of the river. The Pennsylvania Fish and Boat Commission assures that anglers will have plenty of chances to catch fish by stocking trout in the waters of the Youghiogheny River. All fishermen are required to follow the rules and regulations of the fish commission.

=== Camping and picnicking ===
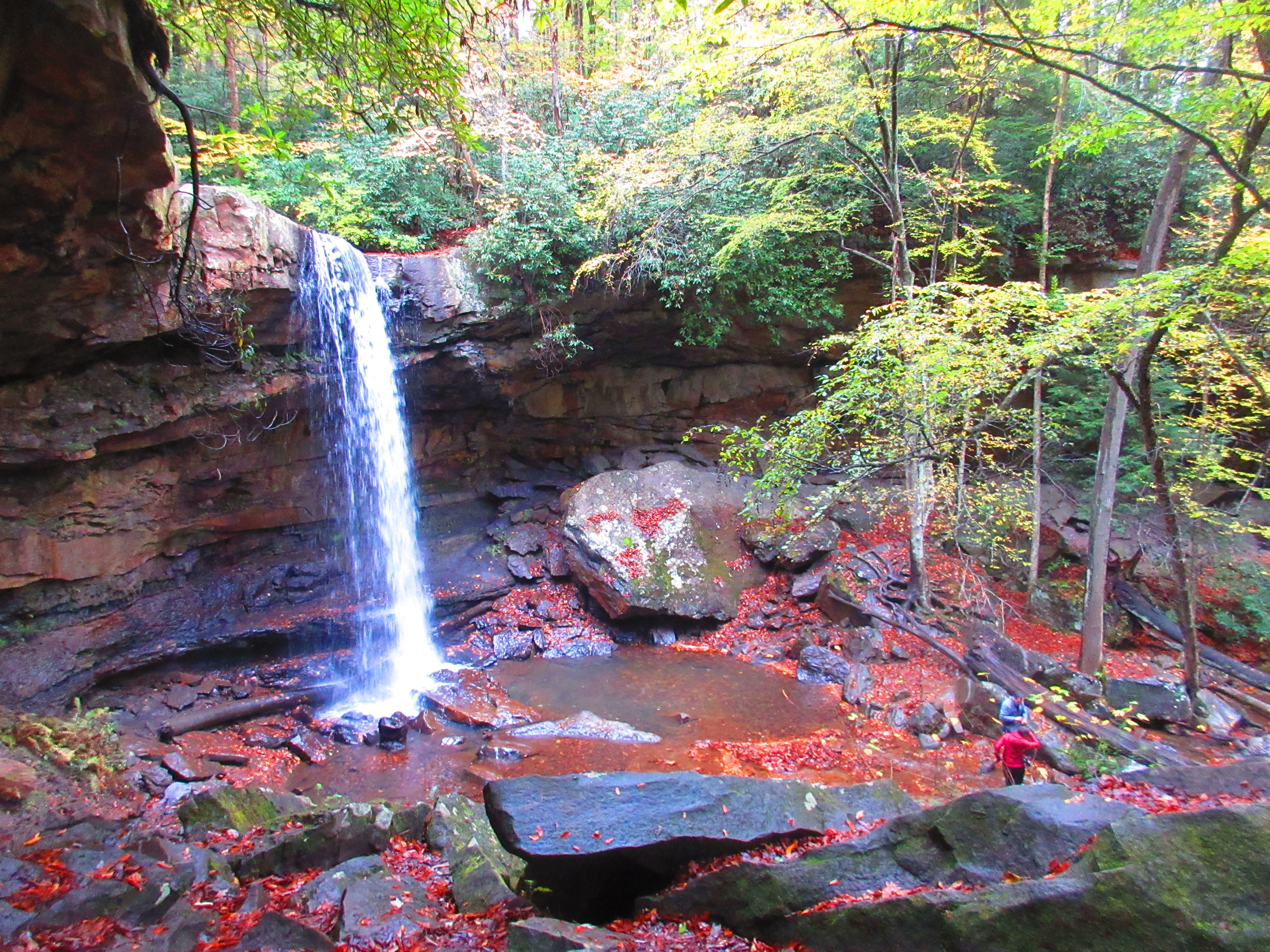
Cucumber Falls during autumn

Visitors can stay overnight at Ohiopyle State Park's Kentuck Campground or rent a cottage. The campground has 226 campsites, with 27 of them being walk-in, tent-only sites. All campsites have a picnic table and fire ring, modern restrooms with hot showers and flush toilets, and four playgrounds. The rustic cottages have electricity but lack running water. Each cottage can sleep five people in single or double bunks.

There are two picnic areas at Ohiopyle State Park. Both have tables, grills, restrooms, and pavilions. Cucumber Run Picnic Area is near Cucumber Run. Tharp Knob Picnic Area is near the Tharp Knob Overlook. It has a large ballfield, volleyball court, playground, and two pavilions.
