= Hen Run (Youghiogheny River tributary) =

Stream in Pennsylvania, USA

Hen Run Tributary to Youghiogheny River
- Location of Hen Run mouth Hen Run (Youghiogheny River tributary) (the United States)

Location
- Country: United States
- State: Pennsylvania
- County: Fayette

Physical characteristics
- Source: Ramcat Run divide
  - location: about 2 miles west of Confluence, Pennsylvania
  - coordinates: 39°48′31″N 079°24′41″W
  - elevation: 1,915 ft (584 m)
- Mouth: Youghiogheny River
  - location: Confluence, Pennsylvania
  - coordinates: 39°48′11″N 079°22′06″W
  - elevation: 1,322 ft (403 m)
- Length: 1.97 mi (3.17 km)
- Basin size: 1.81 square miles (4.7 km^{2})
- Discharge
  - location: Youghiogheny River
  - average: 3.60 cu ft/s (0.102 m^{3}/s) at mouth with Youghiogheny River

Basin features
- Progression: Youghiogheny River → Monongahela River → Ohio River → Mississippi River → Gulf of Mexico
- River system: Monongahela River
- Tributaries
  - left: Leonard Run
  - right: unnamed tributaries
- Bridges: Mae West Road, Flanigan Road

Hen Run is a 1.97 mi (3.17 km) long 1st order tributary to the Youghiogheny River in Fayette County, Pennsylvania.

== Course ==
Hen Run rises about 2 miles west of Confluence, Pennsylvania, and then flows east to join the Youghiogheny River at Confluence.

== Watershed ==
Hen Run drains 1.81 square miles (4.7 km^{2}) of area, receives about 47.1 in/year of precipitation, has a wetness index of 328.98, and is about 72% forested.

== See also ==
- List of rivers of Pennsylvania
