= Braddocks Run =

Stream in Pennsylvania, USA

Braddocks Run Tributary to Youghiogheny River
- Location of Braddocks Run mouth Braddocks Run (the United States)

Location
- Country: United States
- State: Pennsylvania
- County: Somerset

Physical characteristics
- Source: Chub Run divide
  - location: about 1 mile south of Addison, Pennsylvania
  - coordinates: 39°44′01″N 079°20′20″W
  - elevation: 1,760 ft (540 m)
- Mouth: Youghiogheny River in Youghiogheny River Lake
  - location: about 0.25 miles south of Somerfield, Pennsylvania
  - coordinates: 39°44′33″N 079°22′57″W
  - elevation: 1,439 ft (439 m)
- Length: 2.86 mi (4.60 km)
- Basin size: 4.49 square miles (11.6 km^{2})
- Discharge
  - location: Youghiogheny River in Youghiogheny River Lake
  - average: 8.05 cu ft/s (0.228 m^{3}/s) at mouth with Youghiogheny River

Basin features
- Progression: generally northwest
- River system: Monongahela River
- Tributaries
  - left: unnamed tributaries
  - right: unnamed tributaries
- Bridges: Braddocks Run Road

Braddocks Run is a 2.86 mi (4.60 km) long 2nd order tributary to the Youghiogheny River in Somerset County, Pennsylvania.

== Variant names ==
According to the Geographic Names Information System, it has also been known historically as:

- Braddock Run

== Course ==
Braddocks Run rises about 1 mile south of Addison, Pennsylvania, and then flows northwest to join the Youghiogheny River in Youghiogheny River Lake about 0.25 miles south of Somerfield.

== Watershed ==
Braddocks Run drains 4.49 square miles (11.6 km^{2}) of area, receives about 45.7 in/year of precipitation, has a wetness index of 367.96, and is about 62% forested.

== See also ==
- List of rivers of Pennsylvania
