= Dickerson Run (Youghiogheny River tributary) =

Stream in Pennsylvania, USA

Dickerson Run Tributary to Youghiogheny River
- Location of Dickerson Run mouth Dickerson Run (Youghiogheny River tributary) (the United States)

Location
- Country: United States
- State: Pennsylvania
- County: Fayette
- Borough: Vanderbilt

Physical characteristics
- Source: Opossum Run divide
  - location: pond about 1.5 miles northwest of Leisenring, Pennsylvania
  - coordinates: 40°01′15″N 079°39′48″W
  - elevation: 1,120 ft (340 m)
- Mouth: Youghiogheny River
  - location: Liberty, Pennsylvania
  - coordinates: 40°02′45″N 079°39′41″W
  - elevation: 845 ft (258 m)
- Length: 3.36 mi (5.41 km)
- Basin size: 6.04 square miles (15.6 km^{2})
- Discharge
  - location: Youghiogheny River
  - average: 8.64 cu ft/s (0.245 m^{3}/s) at mouth with Youghiogheny River

Basin features
- Progression: Youghiogheny River → Monongahela River → Ohio River → Mississippi River → Gulf of Mexico
- River system: Monongahela River
- Tributaries
  - left: unnamed tributaries
  - right: unnamed tributaries
- Bridges: Lower Sandy Hollow Road (x2), Nellies School Road, Main Street, Creek Road (x2), Hollow Road, Front Street

Dickerson Run is a 3.36 mi (5.41 km) long 3rd order tributary to the Youghiogheny River in Fayette County, Pennsylvania.

== Variant names ==
According to the Geographic Names Information System, it has also been known historically as:

- Dickinsons Mill Run

== Course ==
Dickerson Run rises in a pond about 1.5 miles northwest of Leisenring, Pennsylvania, and then flows north to join the Youghiogheny River at Liberty.

== Watershed ==
Dickerson Run drains 6.04 square miles (15.6 km^{2}) of area, receives about 42.8 in/year of precipitation, has a wetness index of 335.92, and is about 51% forested.
