= Hall Run (Youghiogheny River tributary) =

Stream in Pennsylvania, USA

Hall Run Tributary to Youghiogheny River
- Location of Hall Run mouth Hall Run (Youghiogheny River tributary) (the United States)

Location
- Country: United States
- State: Pennsylvania
- County: Fayette

Physical characteristics
- Source: Fike Run divide
  - location: Fiketown, Pennsylvania
  - coordinates: 39°43′40″N 079°27′07″W
  - elevation: 2,310 ft (700 m)
- Mouth: Youghiogheny River in Youghiogheny River Lake
  - location: Somerfield, Pennsylvania
  - coordinates: 39°45′00″N 079°24′48″W
  - elevation: 1,439 ft (439 m)
- Length: 7.68 mi (12.36 km)
- Basin size: 12.15 square miles (31.5 km^{2})
- Discharge
  - location: Youghiogheny River in Youghiogheny River Lake
  - average: 24.13 cu ft/s (0.683 m^{3}/s) at mouth with Youghiogheny River

Basin features
- Progression: Youghiogheny River → Monongahela River → Ohio River → Mississippi River → Gulf of Mexico
- River system: Monongahela River
- Tributaries
  - left: Pinkham Run
  - right: unnamed tributaries
- Bridges: Glass Road, PA 281, US 40, PA 281, Forrest Road, Dark Hollow Road, Myers Drive

Hall Run is a 7.68 mi (12.36 km) long 3rd order tributary to the Youghiogheny River in Fayette County, Pennsylvania.

== Variant names ==
According to the Geographic Names Information System, it has also been known historically as:

- Hall's Run
- Halls Run

== Course ==
Hall Run rises at Fiketown, Pennsylvania, and then flows easterly to join the Youghiogheny River in Youghiogheny River Lake at Somerfield.

== Watershed ==
Hall Run drains 12.15 square miles (31.5 km^{2}) of area, receives about 48.3 in/year of precipitation, has a wetness index of 350.05, and is about 72% forested.

== See also ==
- List of rivers of Pennsylvania
