= Johnson Run (Youghiogheny River tributary) =

Stream in Pennsylvania, USA

Johnson Run Tributary to Youghiogheny River
- Location of Johnson Run mouth Johnson Run (Youghiogheny River tributary) (the United States)

Location
- Country: United States
- State: Pennsylvania
- County: Fayette

Physical characteristics
- Source: Morgan Run divide
  - location: about 4 miles west of Mill Run
  - coordinates: 39°56′34″N 079°30′40″W
  - elevation: 1,860 ft (570 m)
- Mouth: Youghiogheny River
  - location: about 3 miles southwest of Mill Run
  - coordinates: 39°56′01″N 079°29′18″W
  - elevation: 988 ft (301 m)
- Length: 2.31 mi (3.72 km)
- Basin size: 1.24 square miles (3.2 km^{2})
- Discharge
  - location: Youghiogheny River
  - average: 2.44 cu ft/s (0.069 m^{3}/s) at mouth with Youghiogheny River

Basin features
- Progression: Youghiogheny River → Monongahela River → Ohio River → Mississippi River → Gulf of Mexico
- River system: Monongahela River
- Tributaries
  - left: unnamed tributaries
  - right: unnamed tributaries
- Bridges: Kingan Hill Road

Johnson Run is a 2.31 mi (3.72 km) long 1st order tributary to the Youghiogheny River in Fayette County, Pennsylvania.

== Course ==
Johnson Run rises about 4 miles (6 km) west of the community of Mill Run, and then flows south and turns east to join the Youghiogheny River about 3 miles (5 km) southwest of Mill Run.

== Watershed ==
Johnson Run drains 1.24 square miles (3.2 km^{2}) of area, receives about 46.5 in/year of precipitation, has a wetness index of 317.21, and is about 95% forested.

== See also ==
- List of rivers of Pennsylvania
