= Sheepskin Run =

Stream in Pennsylvania, USA

Sheepskin Run Tributary to Youghiogheny River
- Location of Sheepskin Run mouth Sheepskin Run (the United States)

Location
- Country: United States
- State: Pennsylvania
- County: Fayette

Physical characteristics
- Source: Jim Run divide
  - location: about 1 mile northeast of Ohiopyle, Pennsylvania
  - coordinates: 39°51′52″N 079°27′50″W
  - elevation: 1,700 ft (520 m)
- Mouth: Youghiogheny River
  - location: about 0.25 miles east of Ohiopyle, Pennsylvania
  - coordinates: 39°51′58″N 079°28′55″W
  - elevation: 1,217 ft (371 m)
- Length: 1.29 mi (2.08 km)
- Basin size: 0.81 square miles (2.1 km^{2})
- Discharge
  - location: Youghiogheny River
  - average: 0.81 cu ft/s (0.023 m^{3}/s) at mouth with Youghiogheny River

Basin features
- Progression: southwest
- River system: Monongahela River
- Tributaries
  - left: unnamed tributaries
  - right: unnamed tributaries
- Bridges: none

Sheepskin Run is a 1.29 mi (2.08 km) long 1st order tributary to the Youghiogheny River in Fayette County, Pennsylvania.

== Course ==
Sheepskin Run rises about 1 mile northeast of Ohiopyle, Pennsylvania, and then flows southwest to join the Youghiogheny River about 0.25 miles east of Ohiopyle.

== Watershed ==
Sheepskin Run drains 0.81 square miles (2.1 km^{2}) of area, receives about 47.3 in/year of precipitation, has a wetness index of 332.00, and is about 94% forested.

== See also ==
- List of rivers of Pennsylvania
