= Crooked Run (Youghiogheny River tributary) =

Stream in Pennsylvania, USA

Crooked Run Tributary to Youghiogheny River
- Location of Crooked Run mouth Crooked Run (Youghiogheny River tributary) (the United States)

Location
- Country: United States
- State: Pennsylvania
- County: Fayette

Physical characteristics
- Source: Workman Run divide
  - location: about 1 mile north-northeast of Stewarton, Pennsylvania
  - coordinates: 39°56′07″N 079°27′53″W
  - elevation: 1,510 ft (460 m)
- Mouth: Youghiogheny River
  - location: Stewarton, Pennsylvania
  - coordinates: 39°55′32″N 079°28′49″W
  - elevation: 998 ft (304 m)
- Length: 2.45 mi (3.94 km)
- Basin size: 1.63 square miles (4.2 km^{2})
- Discharge
  - location: Youghiogheny River
  - average: 3.01 cu ft/s (0.085 m^{3}/s) at mouth with Youghiogheny River

Basin features
- Progression: southwest
- River system: Monongahela River
- Tributaries
  - left: unnamed tributaries
  - right: unnamed tributaries
- Bridges: PA 381, Baptist Church Road, Rank Lane, Baptist Church Road, Stewarton Road (x3)

Crooked Run is a 2.45 mi (3.94 km) long 1st order tributary to the Youghiogheny River in Fayette County, Pennsylvania.

== Course ==
Crooked Run rises about 1 mile north-northeast of Stewarton, Pennsylvania, and then flows southwest to join the Youghiogheny River at Stewarton.

== Watershed ==
Crooked Run drains 1.63 square miles (4.2 km^{2}) of area, receives about 46.1 in/year of precipitation, has a wetness index of 385.09, and is about 42% forested.
