= Tub Run (Youghiogheny River tributary) =

Stream in Pennsylvania, USA

Tub Run Tributary to Youghiogheny River
- Location of Tub Run mouth Tub Run (Youghiogheny River tributary) (the United States)

Location
- Country: United States
- State: Pennsylvania
- County: Fayette

Physical characteristics
- Source: Laurel Run divide
  - location: about 2.5 miles north-northeast of Flat Rock, Pennsylvania
  - coordinates: 39°48′34″N 079°26′58″W
  - elevation: 2,415 ft (736 m)
- Mouth: Youghiogheny River in Youghiogheny River Lake
  - location: about 0.25 miles north of Somerfield, Pennsylvania
  - coordinates: 39°46′17″N 079°23′57″W
  - elevation: 1,435 ft (437 m)
- Length: 4.90 mi (7.89 km)
- Basin size: 7.14 square miles (18.5 km^{2})
- Discharge
  - location: Youghiogheny River in Youghiogheny River Lake
  - average: 14.80 cu ft/s (0.419 m^{3}/s) at mouth with Youghiogheny River

Basin features
- Progression: Youghiogheny River → Monongahela River → Ohio River → Mississippi River → Gulf of Mexico
- River system: Monongahela River
- Tributaries
  - left: unnamed tributaries
  - right: unnamed tributaries
- Bridges: Martin Road, PA 281, Tub Run Road, Parnell Road

Tub Run is a 4.90 mi (7.89 km) long 3rd order tributary to the Youghiogheny River in Fayette County, Pennsylvania.

== Variant names ==
According to the Geographic Names Information System, it has also been known historically as:

- Tub Mill Run

== Course ==
Tub Run rises about 2.5 miles north-northeast of Flat Rock, Pennsylvania, and then flows southeast to join the Youghiogheny River in Youghiogheny River Lake about 0.25 miles north of Somerfield.

== Watershed ==
Tub Run drains 7.40 square miles (19.2 km^{2}) of area, receives about 48.8 in/year of precipitation, has a wetness index of 365.42, and is about 87% forested.

== See also ==
- List of rivers of Pennsylvania
