= Youghiogheny Scenic & Wild River =

Protected river in Maryland

Coordinates: 39°40′33.88″N 79°23′28.31″W

The Youghiogheny Scenic & Wild River is a river given special protected status by the state of Maryland. This wild and scenic portion of the Youghiogheny River is located in Western Garrett County, in Western Maryland. The Yough drains an area comprising approximately 397 square miles (1,030 km^{2}) in Maryland, flowing through forests and farms. It rises from the west side of Backbone Mountain in Preston County, West Virginia, near the state's border with Garrett County.

== History ==
In the late 1800s, Garrett County’s economy prospered with the agricultural, coal, and timber industries. When the B&O Railroad arrived in the area after World War II, resources were able to be harvested at a maximum to make room for the railroad. The railroad provided transportation for passengers as well as a way to export timber and coal. Because of the multitudes of waterfalls in this stretch of the Youghiogheny, timber could not be floated down the river. Logging railroads went through the Youghiogheny river valley, permitting exploitation of its timber and coal.

In 1889, the Confluence and Oakland railroad was built to reach the timberlands along the river held by the Yough Manor Land Company. It followed the path of the river from Confluence, PA through Friendsville, MD to the town of Kendall, where a major barrel manufacturer and a sawmill company were located. In 1908, Kendall was a thriving town. Due to operations of the mills ceasing in 1912, however, the town quickly deteriorated. Very little of the town of Kendall exists today. Because of the decrease in industry in the Youghiogheny River Valley, the land naturally regenerated. Through the efforts of landowners through the years, much of the land has been restored to its original state. The Maryland Department of Natural Resources is acquiring land along the river to be preserved for future generations to enjoy.

== Wild and Scenic Rivers Act ==
The Youghiogheny Scenic and Wild River is considered to be an ecological greenway with a water trail, which is a piece of land that has been set aside to preserve open space. The water trail is the flowing Youghiogheny River. The Yough is one of the nine rivers that are recognized under the Maryland Wild and Scenic Rivers Act. The act was enacted by congress in 1968 and is meant to recognize and protect rivers with outstanding scenic, geological, ecological, historical, and cultural value. The Wild and Scenic Rivers act encourages the preservation and protection of the natural values of the river, strives for enhanced water quality to fulfill conservation purposes, and encourages the wise use of resources. The Yough is included under this act due to the substantial natural values it possesses, such as the outstanding white water, the scenic beauty of narrow, heavily forested gorges, and the abundance of trout fisheries. The act strives to keep the river in the free-flowing condition it is in. It is up to the state and local governments to enforce the act.

A Scenic and Wild Review Board is necessary to effectively enforce the act. The duties of the board members are to review, study, and plan. They are always to be looking for ways to improve the conditions of the river and review recommendations that have been made. One of their duties includes creating regulations that pertain to the river. For example, they prohibit federal support that could jeopardize the act. The board members also developed a regulation that maintains a balance between construction of dams and preservation of the river's natural state so they can enforce permanent protection on certain parts of the river. The members are also required to meet regularly and proceed with business with the advice and consent of the appropriate local governing body. Members of the board include the secretary of the Maryland Department of Natural Resources, the secretary of the Maryland Department of Agriculture and the secretary of the Environmental Protection Agency. Members also include the director of planning and a County Commissioner. Since the wild and scenic portion of the river runs through Garrett County, the Garrett County Commissioner is on the board.

== Designation as Wild and Scenic ==
The portion of the Youghiogheny River located in Garrett County, Maryland is the wild and scenic portion. The State Scenic and Wild River System was created when the Maryland General Assembly passed the Scenic and Wild Rivers Act in 1968. The process of designating a river as scenic, wild, or both occurs in four steps:

1. an inventory of the river’s resources and landmarks is taken to decide if the river is eligible to be determined as scenic or wild,
2. local governments officially propose and endorse the designation of the river,
3. The Scenic and Wild Rivers Board reviews the proposal, and
4. the Maryland General Assembly officially designates the river.

To be determined as scenic, the river must be a, “free-flowing river whose shoreline and related land are predominantly forested, agricultural, grassland, marshland, or swampland with a minimum of development for at least 2 miles of the river length.” To be determined as wild, the river must be a, “free-flowing river whose shoreline and related land are undeveloped, inaccessible except by trail, or predominantly primitive in a natural state for at least 4 miles of the river length.”
