= Rock Spring Run (Youghiogheny River tributary) =

Stream in Pennsylvania, USA

Rock Spring Run Tributary to Youghiogheny River
- Location of Rock Spring Run mouth Rock Spring Run (Youghiogheny River tributary) (the United States)

Location
- Country: United States
- State: Pennsylvania
- County: Fayette

Physical characteristics
- Source: Bear Run divide
  - location: about 2.5 miles north-northeast of Victoria, Pennsylvania
  - coordinates: 39°52′51″N 079°26′31″W
  - elevation: 2,215 ft (675 m)
- Mouth: Youghiogheny River
  - location: Victoria, Pennsylvania
  - coordinates: 39°51′15″N 079°27′36″W
  - elevation: 1,257 ft (383 m)
- Length: 2.34 mi (3.77 km)
- Basin size: 1.56 square miles (4.0 km^{2})
- Discharge
  - location: Youghiogheny River
  - average: 3.18 cu ft/s (0.090 m^{3}/s) at mouth with Youghiogheny River

Basin features
- Progression: southwest
- River system: Monongahela River
- Tributaries
  - left: unnamed tributaries
  - right: unnamed tributaries
- Bridges: Victoria Trail

Rock Spring Run is a 2.34 mi (3.77 km) long 1st order tributary to the Youghiogheny River in Fayette County, Pennsylvania.

== Variant names ==
According to the Geographic Names Information System, it has also been known historically as:

- Shermans Run

== Course ==
Rock Spring Run rises about 2.5 miles north-northeast of Victoria, Pennsylvania, and then flows southwest to join the Youghiogheny River at Victoria.

== Watershed ==
Rock Spring Run drains 1.56 square miles (4.0 km^{2}) of area, receives about 47.9 in/year of precipitation, has a wetness index of 381.95, and is about 94% forested.

== See also ==
- List of rivers of Pennsylvania
