= Mounts Creek (Youghiogheny River tributary) =

Stream in Pennsylvania, USA

Mounts Creek Tributary to Youghiogheny River
- Location of Mounts Creek mouth Mounts Creek (Youghiogheny River tributary) (the United States)

Location
- Country: United States
- State: Pennsylvania
- County: Fayette
- Borough: Connellsville

Physical characteristics
- Source: South Spruce Run divide
  - location: about 2 miles northwest of Clinton, Pennsylvania
  - coordinates: 40°03′57″N 079°28′44″W
  - elevation: 1,980 ft (600 m)
- Mouth: Youghiogheny River
  - location: Connellsville, Pennsylvania
  - coordinates: 40°01′46″N 079°36′08″W
  - elevation: 853 ft (260 m)
- Length: 13.11 mi (21.10 km)
- Basin size: 31.19 square miles (80.8 km^{2})
- Discharge
  - location: Youghiogheny River
  - average: 49.11 cu ft/s (1.391 m^{3}/s) at mouth with Youghiogheny River

Basin features
- Progression: north, west, and south
- River system: Monongahela River
- Tributaries
  - left: South Spruce Run; Whites Run
  - right: Irish Run
- Bridges: Wingrove Road, Eutsey Road, Ore Mine Hill Road, PLeasant Valley Road, Prittstown Road, Gimlet Hill Road, Keefer Road, Medsger Road, Country Club Road, Longanecker Road, Pleasant Valley Road, Emglishman Hill Road, US 119, Moyer Road (x3), Bell View Road, Narrows Hill Road, Pittsburgh Street Ext., York Avenue

Mounts Creek is a 13.11 mi (21.10 km) long 3rd order tributary to the Youghiogheny River in Fayette County, Pennsylvania.

== Variant names ==
According to the Geographic Names Information System, it has also been known historically as:

- Mount's Creek

== Course ==
Mounts Creek rises about 2 miles northwest of Clinton, Pennsylvania, and then flows north, west, and south in a hook to join the Youghiogheny River just downstream of Connellsville.

== Watershed ==
Mounts Creek drains 31.19 square miles (80.8 km^{2}) of area, receives about 40.8 in/year of precipitation, has a wetness index of 365.50, and is about 61% forested.
