= Sugar Run (Youghiogheny River tributary) =

Stream in Pennsylvania, USA

Sugar Run Tributary to Youghiogheny River
- Location of Sugar Run mouth Sugar Run (Youghiogheny River tributary) (the United States)

Location
- Country: United States
- State: Pennsylvania
- County: Fayette

Physical characteristics
- Source: Bruner Run and Blackberry Run divide
  - location: about 2 miles west of Kaufmann, Pennsylvania
  - coordinates: 39°54′28″N 079°30′30″W
  - elevation: 1,545 ft (471 m)
- Mouth: Youghiogheny River
  - location: about 1 mile north of Holland Hill, Pennsylvania
  - coordinates: 39°54′21″N 079°29′20″W
  - elevation: 999 ft (304 m)
- Length: 1.01 mi (1.63 km)
- Basin size: 0.73 square miles (1.9 km^{2})
- Discharge
  - location: Youghiogheny River
  - average: 1.49 cu ft/s (0.042 m^{3}/s) at mouth with Youghiogheny River

Basin features
- Progression: Youghiogheny River → Monongahela River → Ohio River → Mississippi River → Gulf of Mexico
- River system: Monongahela River
- Tributaries
  - left: unnamed tributaries
  - right: unnamed tributaries
- Bridges: none

Sugar Run is a 1.01 mi (1.63 km) long 1st order tributary to the Youghiogheny River in Fayette County, Pennsylvania.

== Course ==
Sugar Run rises about 2 miles west of Kaufmann, Pennsylvania, and then flows south-southeast to join the Youghiogheny River about 1 mile north of Holland Hill.

== Watershed ==
Sugar Run drains 0.73 square miles (1.9 km^{2}) of area, receives about 47.0 in/year of precipitation, has a wetness index of 347.83, and is about 94% forested.

== See also ==
- List of rivers of Pennsylvania
