= Connell Run =

Stream in Pennsylvania, USA

Connell Run Tributary to Youghiogheny River
- Location of Connell Run mouth Connell Run (the United States)

Location
- Country: United States
- State: Pennsylvania
- County: Fayette
- Borough: Connellsville

Physical characteristics
- Source: Tates Run divide (Chestnut Ridge)
  - location: about 1.5 miles west of Pleasant Hill, Pennsylvania
  - coordinates: 40°00′35″N 079°32′05″W
  - elevation: 1,920 ft (590 m)
- Mouth: Youghiogheny River
  - location: Connellsville, Pennsylvania
  - coordinates: 40°00′55″N 079°35′54″W
  - elevation: 866 ft (264 m)
- Length: 3.78 mi (6.08 km)
- Basin size: 3.14 square miles (8.1 km^{2})
- Discharge
  - location: Youghiogheny River
  - average: 5.44 cu ft/s (0.154 m^{3}/s) at mouth with Youghiogheny River

Basin features
- Progression: generally west
- River system: Monongahela River
- Tributaries
  - left: unnamed tributaries
  - right: unnamed tributaries
- Bridges: McCoy Hollow Road (x5), Hosfelt Road, Perry Street, South Alley, E Park Drive (x2), Wills Road, Baldwin Avenue, S Pittsburgh Street, S Arch Street

Connell Run is a 3.14 mi (5.05 km) long 2nd order tributary to the Youghiogheny River in Fayette County, Pennsylvania. This is the only stream of this name in the United States.

== Course ==
Connell Run rises about 1.5 miles west-southwest of Pleasant Hill, Pennsylvania, and then flows west to join the Youghiogheny River at Connellsville.

== Watershed ==
Connell Run drains 3.78 square miles (9.8 km^{2}) of area, receives about 45.5 in/year of precipitation, has a wetness index of 339.82, and is about 70% forested.

== Natural history ==
Connell Run is the location of Connell Run BDA. The slopes on Connell Run provide habitat for a plant of special concern.
