= Dunbar Creek =

Stream in Pennsylvania, USA

Dunbar Creek Tributary to Youghiogheny River
- Location of Dunbar Creek mouth Dunbar Creek (the United States)

Location
- Country: United States
- State: Pennsylvania
- County: Fayette
- Borough: Connellsville; Dunbar

Physical characteristics
- Source: Coolspring Run divide
  - location: Jumonville, Pennsylvania
  - coordinates: 39°52′58″N 079°38′40″W
  - elevation: 2,130 ft (650 m)
- Mouth: Youghiogheny River
  - location: Connellsville, Pennsylvania
  - coordinates: 40°00′16″N 079°35′51″W
  - elevation: 879 ft (268 m)
- Length: 12.83 mi (20.65 km)
- Basin size: 36.91 square miles (95.6 km^{2})
- Discharge
  - location: Youghiogheny River
  - average: 70.03 cu ft/s (1.983 m^{3}/s) at mouth with Youghiogheny River

Basin features
- Progression: Youghiogheny River → Monongahela River → Ohio River → Mississippi River → Gulf of Mexico
- River system: Monongahela River
- Tributaries
  - left: Irishtown Run; Gist Run
  - right: Glade Run; Limestone Run; Tucker Run; Elk Rock Run
- Bridges: Church Hill Road, Railroad Street, Bridge Street, Riverside Drive

Dunbar Creek is a 12.6-mile-long (20.3 km) stream which is located in Fayette County, Pennsylvania. It flows into the Youghiogheny River at Connellsville.

== History and features ==
According to the Geographic Names Information System, Dunbar Creek has also been known historically as:

- New Haven and Dunber Cree

It is a noted trout stream, with a popular fly fishing-only section on its upper portions. The Pennsylvania Fish Commission stocks the stream with brown and brook trout. There are also some native brook trout located in its headwaters. The Budinsky hole is a popular fishing spot on the stream.

== Course ==
Dunbar Creek rises in a pond at Jumonville, Pennsylvania, and then flows northerly along the west side of Chestnut Ridge to join the Youghiogheny River at Connellsville.

== Watershed ==
Dunbar Creek drains 36.91 square miles (95.6 km^{2}) of area, receives about 48.3 in/year of precipitation, has a wetness index of 358.73, and is about 85% forested.

== Natural history ==
The mouth of Dunbar Creek is the location of Dunbar Creek Confluence BDA. Here, there is a mature riverine forest and a scour habitat that provide habitat for a plant species of special concern.
