= Hickman Run (Youghiogheny River tributary) =

Stream in Pennsylvania, USA

Hickman Run Tributary to Youghiogheny River
- Location of Hickman Run mouth Hickman Run (Youghiogheny River tributary) (the United States)

Location
- Country: United States
- State: Pennsylvania
- County: Fayette

Physical characteristics
- Source: Jacobs Creek divide
  - location: about 2 miles west of Owensdale, Pennsylvania
  - coordinates: 40°04′50″N 079°37′39″W
  - elevation: 1,190 ft (360 m)
- Mouth: Youghiogheny River
  - location: Raineytown, Pennsylvania
  - coordinates: 40°02′26″N 079°38′51″W
  - elevation: 850 ft (260 m)
- Length: 3.05 mi (4.91 km)
- Basin size: 6.04 square miles (15.6 km^{2})
- Discharge
  - location: Youghiogheny River
  - average: 3.66 cu ft/s (0.104 m^{3}/s) at mouth with Youghiogheny River

Basin features
- Progression: generally south
- River system: Monongahela River
- Tributaries
  - left: unnamed tributaries
  - right: unnamed tributaries
- Bridges: Gillespie Road, PA 819, Clark Road, Hickory Square Road, Hickman Road, Spring Grove Road, Raineytown Road

Hickman Run is a 3.05 mi (4.91 km) long 2nd order tributary to the Youghiogheny River in Fayette County, Pennsylvania.

== Course ==
Hickman Run rises about 2 miles west of Owensdale, Pennsylvania, and then flows south to join the Youghiogheny River at Raineytown.

== Watershed ==
Hickman Run drains 2.68 square miles (6.9 km^{2}) of area, receives about 42.1 in/year of precipitation, has a wetness index of 372.93, and is about 34% forested.
