= Cedar Creek (Youghiogheny River tributary) =

Stream in Pennsylvania, USA

Cedar Creek Tributary to Youghiogheny River
- Location of Cedar Creek mouth Cedar Creek (Youghiogheny River tributary) (the United States)

Location
- Country: United States
- State: Pennsylvania
- County: Westmoreland

Physical characteristics
- Source: Lutz Creek divide
  - location: about 3 miles northeast of Arnold City, Pennsylvania
  - coordinates: 40°08′11″N 079°48′09″W
  - elevation: 1,130 ft (340 m)
- Mouth: Youghiogheny River
  - location: about 2 miles east of Sweeneys Crossroads, Pennsylvania
  - coordinates: 40°10′44″N 079°46′40″W
  - elevation: 758 ft (231 m)
- Length: 4.74 mi (7.63 km)
- Basin size: 5.73 square miles (14.8 km^{2})
- Discharge
  - location: Youghiogheny River
  - average: 6.72 cu ft/s (0.190 m^{3}/s) at mouth with Youghiogheny River

Basin features
- Progression: Youghiogheny River → Monongahela River → Ohio River → Mississippi River → Gulf of Mexico
- River system: Monongahela River
- Tributaries
  - left: unnamed tributaries
  - right: unnamed tributaries
- Bridges: Todd Farm Road, Cedar Hill Boulevard, Mildred Road, Cobble Lane, Ridge Road, I-70, Smith Road, Pfile Lane, PA 51, Concord Lane

Cedar Creek is a 4.74 mi (7.63 km) long 2nd order tributary to the Youghiogheny River in Westmoreland County, Pennsylvania.

== Course ==
Cedar Creek rises about 3 miles northeast of Arnold City, Pennsylvania, and then flows north to join the Youghiogheny River about 2 miles northeast of Sweeneys Crossroads.

== Watershed ==
Cedar Creek drains 5.73 square miles (14.8 km^{2}) of area, receives about 40.1 in/year of precipitation, has a wetness index of 354.20, and is about 43% forested.
