= Furnace Run (Youghiogheny River tributary) =

Stream in Pennsylvania, USA

Furnace Run Tributary to Youghiogheny River
- Location of Furnace Run mouth Furnace Run (Youghiogheny River tributary) (the United States)

Location
- Country: United States
- State: Pennsylvania
- County: Fayette

Physical characteristics
- Source: Allen Run divide
  - location: Buena Vista, Pennsylvania
  - coordinates: 40°01′16″N 079°42′30″W
  - elevation: 1,290 ft (390 m)
- Mouth: Youghiogheny River
  - location: about 1 mile west of Dawson, Pennsylvania
  - coordinates: 40°03′25″N 079°41′28″W
  - elevation: 839 ft (256 m)
- Length: 2.70 mi (4.35 km)
- Basin size: 3.19 square miles (8.3 km^{2})
- Discharge
  - location: Youghiogheny River
  - average: 4.78 cu ft/s (0.135 m^{3}/s) at mouth with Youghiogheny River

Basin features
- Progression: Youghiogheny River → Monongahela River → Ohio River → Mississippi River → Gulf of Mexico
- River system: Monongahela River
- Tributaries
  - left: unnamed tributaries
  - right: unnamed tributaries
- Bridges: Goth Road, PA 201, Virgin Run Road, Hawk Road (x3)

Furnace Run is a 2.70 mi (4.35 km) long 2nd order tributary to the Youghiogheny River in Fayette County, Pennsylvania.

== Course ==
Furance Run rises in Buena Vista, Pennsylvania, and then flows northeast to join the Youghiogheny River about 1 mile west of Dawson.

== Watershed ==
Furnace Run drains 3.19 square miles (8.3 km^{2}) of area, receives about 43.0 in/year of precipitation, has a wetness index of 348.92, and is about 67% forested.

== Natural history ==
Furnace Run is the location of Furnace Run Confluence BDA, which contains a scour area and a mature riverine forest as well as a rare plant species.
