= Lick Run (Youghiogheny River tributary) =

Stream in Pennsylvania, USA

Lick Run Tributary to Youghiogheny River
- Location of Lick Run mouth Lick Run (Youghiogheny River tributary) (the United States)

Location
- Country: United States
- State: Pennsylvania
- County: Fayette

Physical characteristics
- Source: Bear Run divide
  - location: about 2 miles north of Bidwell, Pennsylvania
  - coordinates: 39°53′53″N 079°24′49″W
  - elevation: 2,100 ft (640 m)
- Mouth: Youghiogheny River
  - location: Bidwell, Pennsylvania
  - coordinates: 39°51′19″N 079°25′13″W
  - elevation: 1,272 ft (388 m)
- Length: 2.47 mi (3.98 km)
- Basin size: 2.54 square miles (6.6 km^{2})
- Discharge
  - location: Youghiogheny River
  - average: 5.43 cu ft/s (0.154 m^{3}/s) at mouth with Youghiogheny River

Basin features
- Progression: generally south
- River system: Monongahela River
- Tributaries
  - left: unnamed tributaries
  - right: unnamed tributaries
- Bridges: none

Lick Run is a 2.47 mi (3.98 km) long 1st order tributary to the Youghiogheny River in Fayette County, Pennsylvania.

== Course ==
Lick Run rises about 2 miles north of Bidwell, Pennsylvania, and then flows south to join the Youghiogheny River at Bidwell.

== Watershed ==
Lick Run drains 2.54 square miles (6.6 km^{2}) of area, receives about 49.0 in/year of precipitation, has a wetness index of 305.60, and is about 91% forested.

== See also ==
- List of rivers of Pennsylvania
