= Cucumber Run (Youghiogheny River tributary) =

Stream in Pennsylvania, USA

Cucumber Run Tributary to Youghiogheny River
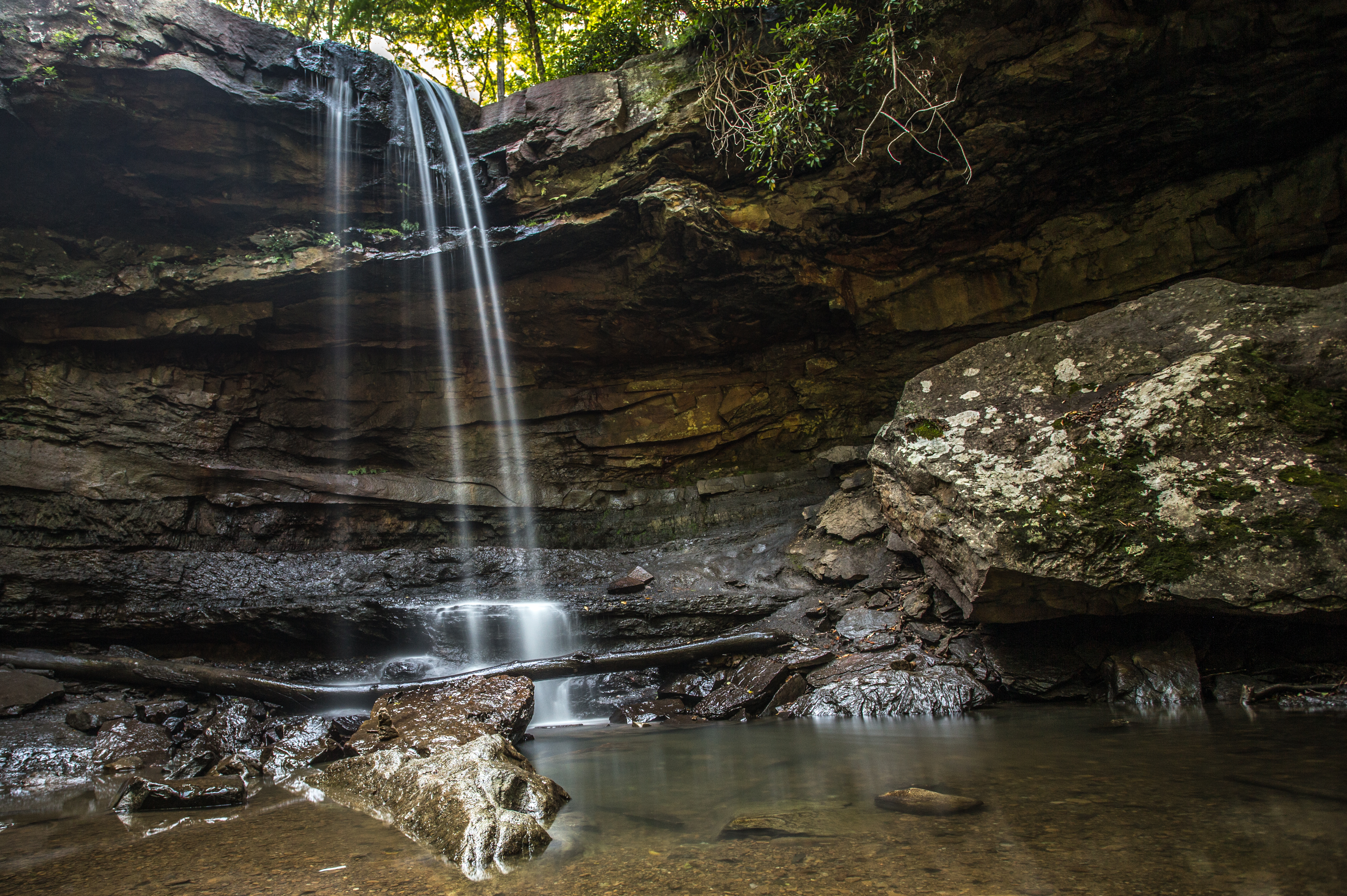
- Cucumber Falls on Cucumber Run

- Location of Cucumber Run mouth Cucumber Run (Youghiogheny River tributary) (the United States)

Location
- Country: United States
- State: Pennsylvania
- County: Fayette

Physical characteristics
- Source: Meadow Run divide
  - location: about 2 miles south of Deer Lake, Pennsylvania
  - coordinates: 39°50′21″N 079°32′55″W
  - elevation: 1,895 ft (578 m)
- Mouth: Youghiogheny River
  - location: about 0.25 miles southesst of Ohiopyle, Pennsylvania
  - coordinates: 39°51′50″N 079°30′04″W
  - elevation: 1,042 ft (318 m)
- Length: 3.09 mi (4.97 km)
- Basin size: 6.42 square miles (16.6 km^{2})
- Discharge
  - location: Youghiogheny River
  - average: 14.50 cu ft/s (0.411 m^{3}/s) at mouth with Youghiogheny River

Basin features
- Progression: Youghiogheny River → Monongahela River → Ohio River → Mississippi River → Gulf of Mexico
- River system: Monongahela River
- Tributaries
  - left: North Branch Cucumber Run
  - right: unnamed tributaries
- Bridges: Bell Grove Road, Middle Ridge Road, Ohiopyle Road

Cucumber Run is a 3.09 mi (4.97 km) long 3rd order tributary to the Youghiogheny River in Fayette County, Pennsylvania.

== Course ==
Cucumber Run rises about 2 miles southeast of Deer Lake, Pennsylvania, and then flows northeast to join the Youghiogheny River about 0.25 miles southeast of Ohiopyle.

== Watershed ==
Cucumber Run drains 6.42 square miles (16.6 km^{2}) of area, receives about 51.1 in/year of precipitation, has a wetness index of 350.68, and is about 85% forested.

== See also ==
- List of rivers of Pennsylvania
