= Washington Run (Youghiogheny River tributary) =

Stream in Pennsylvania, USA

Washington Run Tributary to Youghiogheny River
- Location of Washington Run mouth Washington Run (Youghiogheny River tributary) (the United States)

Location
- Country: United States
- State: Pennsylvania
- County: Fayette
- Borough: Perryopolis

Physical characteristics
- Source: Crabapple Run divide
  - location: about 1 mile west of Curfew, Pennsylvania
  - coordinates: 40°2′38″N 79°46′42″W
  - elevation: 1,080 ft (330 m)
- Mouth: Youghiogheny River
  - location: across the Youighiogheny River from Layton, Pennsylvania
  - coordinates: 40°5′19″N 79°43′44″W
  - elevation: 798 ft (243 m)
- Length: 5.16 mi (8.30 km)
- Basin size: 7.72 square miles (20.0 km^{2})
- Discharge
  - location: Youghiogheny River
  - average: 10.28 cu ft/s (0.291 m^{3}/s) at mouth with Youghiogheny River

Basin features
- Progression: Youghiogheny River → Monongahela River → Ohio River → Mississippi River → Gulf of Mexico
- River system: Monongahela River
- Tributaries
  - left: unnamed tributaries
  - right: unnamed tributaries
- Bridges: Fayette City Road, Tony Row Road, Quaker Church Road (x2), PA 51, Liberty Street, Cemetery Road, Layton Road (x2)

Washington Run is a 5.16 mi (8.30 km) long 2nd order tributary to the Youghiogheny River in Fayette County, Pennsylvania, United States.

== Course ==
Washington Run rises about 1 mile west of Curfew, Pennsylvania, and then flows north and turns east to join the Youghiogheny River across from Layton.

== Watershed ==
Washington Run drains 7.72 square miles (20.0 km^{2}) of area, receives about 41.9 in/year of precipitation, has a wetness index of 353.54, and is about 51% forested.
