= Youghiogheny River =

River in Pennsylvania, West Virginia and Maryland, U.S.

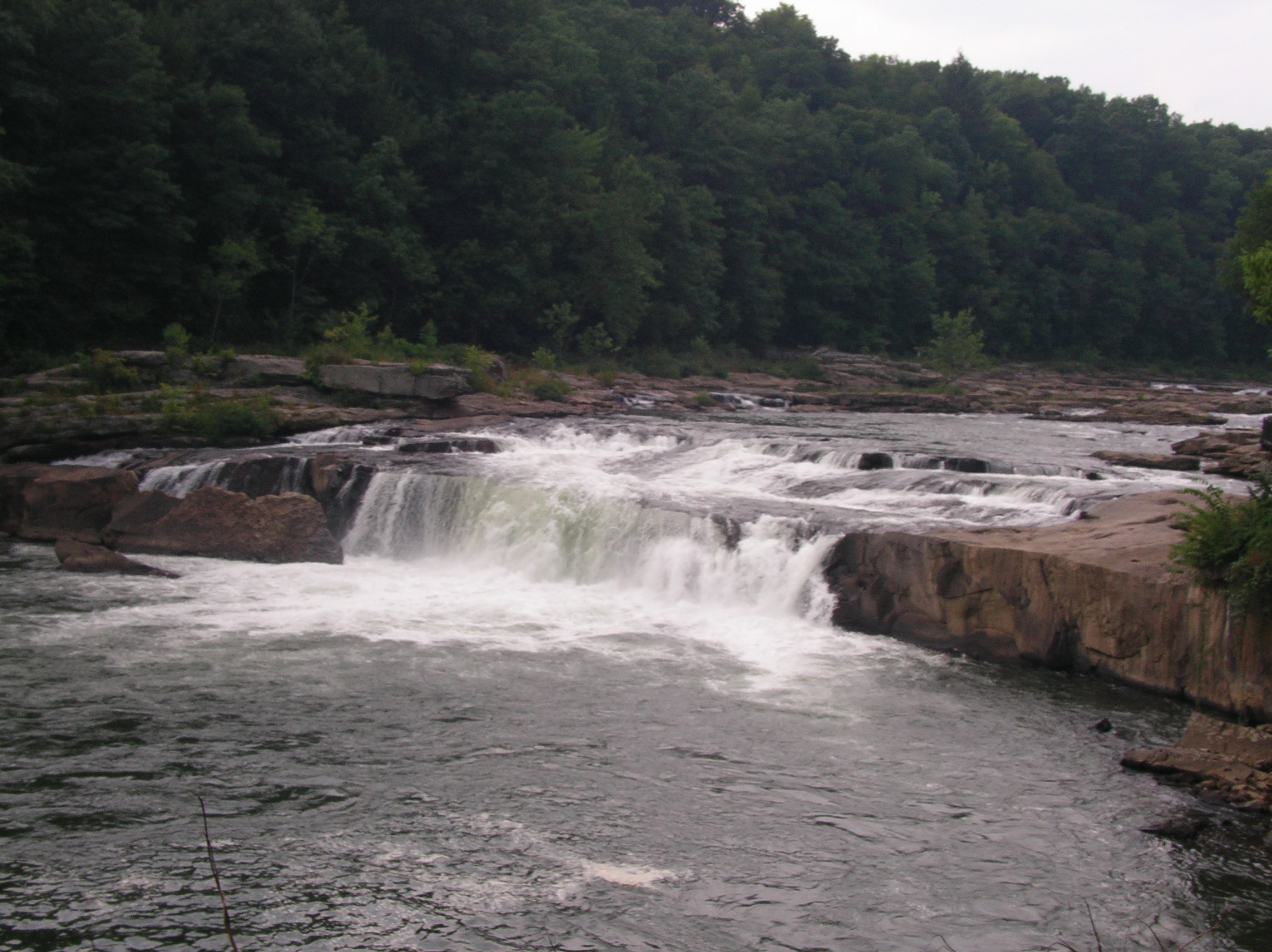
- Ohiopyle Falls on the Youghiogheny in Ohiopyle State Park in Pennsylvania

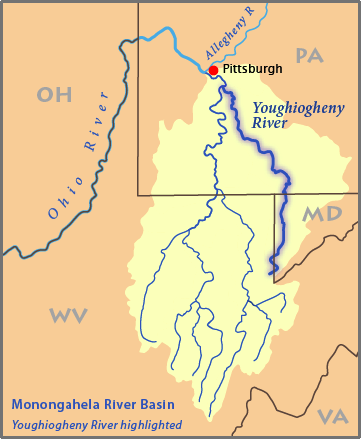
- Map of the Monongahela River basin with the Youghiogheny River highlighted

Location
- Country: United States
- State: Pennsylvania, Maryland, West Virginia
- Counties: Allegheny, PA, Westmoreland, PA, Fayette, PA, Somerset, PA, Garrett, MD, Preston, WV
- Cities: McKeesport, PA, Connellsville, PA

Physical characteristics
- Source
  - location: Backbone Mountain, Preston County, West Virginia
  - coordinates: 39°14′43″N 79°29′19″W
  - elevation: 2,688 ft (819 m)
- Mouth: Monongahela River
  - location: McKeesport, Allegheny County, PA
  - coordinates: 40°21′19″N 79°52′16″W
  - elevation: 724 ft (221 m)
- Length: 132 mi (212 km)
- Basin size: 1,715 sq mi (4,440 km^{2})
- Discharge
  - location: Sutersville, PA
  - average: 3,477 cu ft/s (98.5 m^{3}/s)
  - minimum: 717 cu ft/s (20.3 m^{3}/s)
  - maximum: 35,500 cu ft/s (1,010 m^{3}/s)
- Discharge
  - location: Oakland, MD
  - average: 329 cu ft/s (9.3 m^{3}/s)

Basin features
- Tributaries
  - left: Maple Run, Rhine Creek, Cherry Bottom Run, Snowy Creek, Chisholm Run, Herrington Run, Toliver Run, Muddy Creek, Salt Block Run, White Rock Run, Trap Run, Laurel Run, Peppermint Hollow, Buffalo Run, Reason Run, Hall Run, Tub Run, Hen Run, Ramcat Run, Long Run, Meadow Run, Cucumber Run, Jonathan Run, Sugar Run, Bruner Run, Johnson Run, Morgan Run, Dunbar Creek, Opossum Run, Dickerson Run, Furnace Run, Virgin Run, Washington Run, Browneller Run, Flack Hollow, Cedar Creek, Pollock Run, Gillespie Run
  - right: Sand Spring Run, Cherry Creek, White Meadow Run, Little Youghiogheny River, Millers Run, Round Glade Run, Deep Creek, Fork Run, Steep Run, Ginseng Run, Gap Run, Bear Creek, Mill Run, Braddocks Run, Casselman River, Drake Run, Camp Run, Lick Run, Rock Spring Run, Sheepskin Run, Jim Run, Stulls Run, Bear Run, Laurel Run, Crooked Run, Workman Run, Indian Creek, Laurel Run, Connell Run, Mounts Creek, Galley Run, Hickman Run, Smiley Run, Laurel Run, Jacobs Creek, Sewickley Creek, Crawford Run, Long Run
- Waterbodies: Silver Lake, Youghiogheny River Lake

The Youghiogheny River (/jɒkəˈɡeɪni/ yok-ə-GAY-nee), or the Yough (/ˈjɒk/ YOK) for short, is a 134-mile-long (216 km) tributary of the Monongahela River in West Virginia, Maryland, and Pennsylvania. It drains an area on the west side of the Allegheny Mountains northward into Pennsylvania, providing a small watershed in extreme western Maryland into the tributaries of the Mississippi River. Youghiogheny is a Lenape word meaning "a stream flowing in a contrary direction".

== Variant names ==
According to the Geographic Names Information System, it has also been known historically as:

- Gawgawgamie, Ohio Gani River, Roonanetto, Yanghyanghgain, Yaughvaughani, Yauyougaine River, Yawyawganey, Yawyougaine River, Yeoyogani, Yochio Geni, Yoghioghenny River, Yogyogany River, Yohioganey, Yohogany, Youghiogeny River, Youghogania, Youghyaughye, Youghyoghgyina River, Yoxhio geni River, Yoxhiogany, Yoxhiogeny, Yoxyougaine River, Yughiogeny

== Course ==
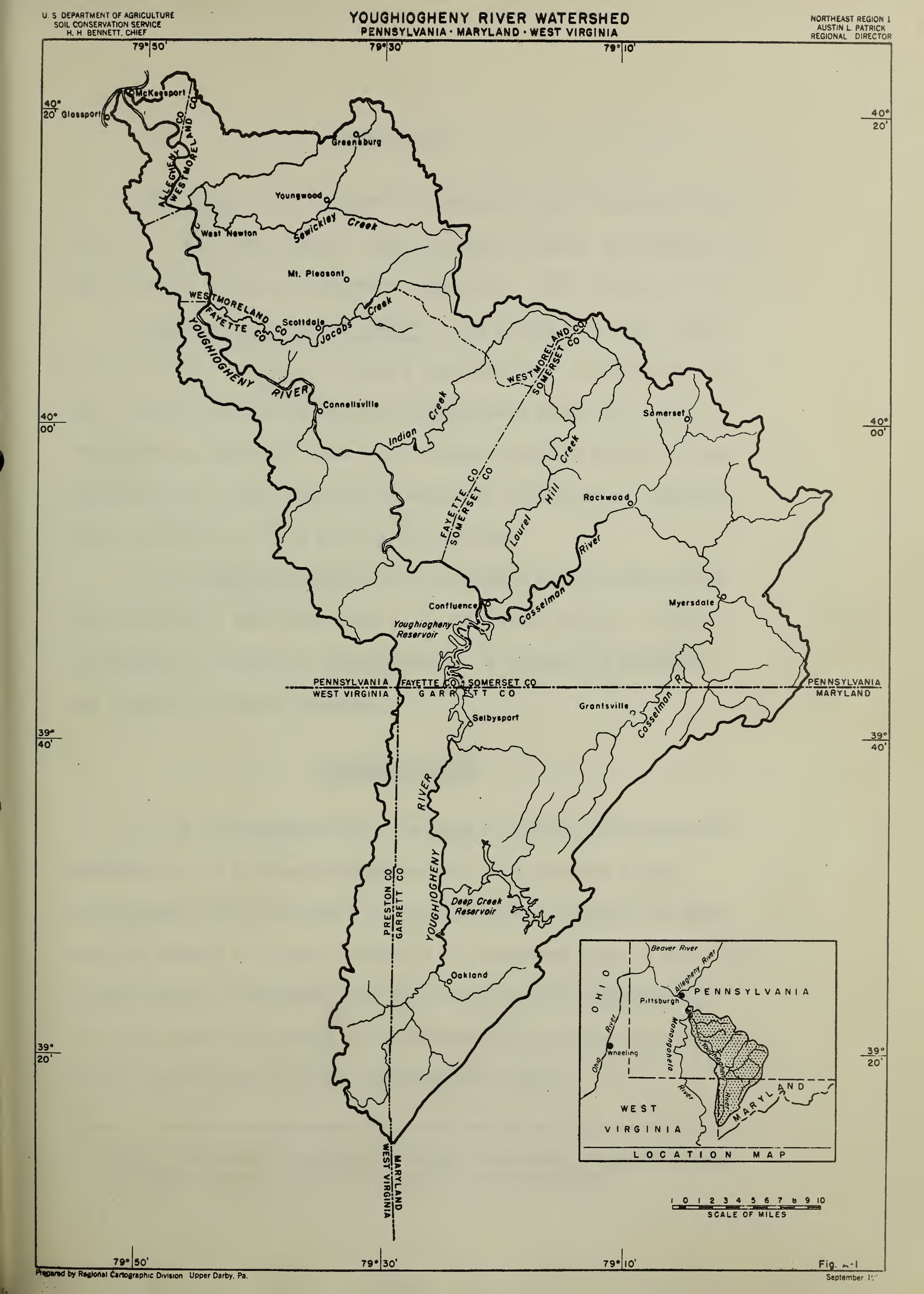
Youghiogheny River Watershed in Pennsylvania, Maryland, and West Virginia

The Youghiogheny rises in far Western Maryland, in Garrett County, from springs on Backbone Mountain. The headwaters are approximately 10 miles (16 km) north of the headwaters of the North Branch Potomac River and pass through Silver Lake before flowing north-northeast back into Garrett County, Maryland, then flowing north past Oakland and roughly parallel to the West Virginia border, separated by approximately 3 miles (5 km). The river enters southwestern Pennsylvania on the border between Fayette and Somerset counties. It flows northwest through a gap in Chestnut Ridge and then past Connellsville. It joins the Monongahela River from the southeast (right bank) at McKeesport.

Just upstream from Confluence, Pennsylvania, approximately 6 miles (9.7 km) north of the Pennsylvania border, the river is impounded by the 184-foot-high (56 m) Youghiogheny Dam to form the Youghiogheny River Lake, a reservoir that stretches upstream into northern Maryland. The dam was completed in 1944 primarily for flood control. U.S. Route 40 crosses the Youghiogheny River Lake between Jockey Hollow on the Fayette County side and Somerfield on the Somerset County side.

== History ==
1751 map depicting the "Yawyawganey River" (top-left corner)

In the colonial era and in the early United States, the valley of the river provided an important route of access through the mountains for settlers and military forces from Virginia to western Pennsylvania and the Ohio Country. In 1754, as a militia officer of the British Colony of Virginia, George Washington followed the river in an attempt to find a water route to Fort Duquesne, then held by the French.

During the uncommonly severe winter of 1787-88, American pioneers to the Northwest Territory departed New England and cut trails westward through the mountains. At Sumrill's Ferry, present-day West Newton, Pennsylvania, on the Youghiogheny River, the men built flatboats which carried them down the Youghiogheny River to the Monongahela River, and then to the Ohio River, and onward to the Northwest Territory.

The pioneer town of Somerfield, Pennsylvania, was inundated by the building of the Youghiogheny Dam in 1943. Perryopolis in northern Fayette County, Pennsylvania, is the site of the George Washington Grist Mill. The Youghiogheny River Trail follows the river in southwestern Pennsylvania southeast of Connellsville.

Coal mining became an important industry along the lower Youghiogheny River during the 19th century. At that time, the name was often spelled Yohoghany (or variants thereof), and during the 1860s and 1870s that spelling was used as the name of a post office near what is now Shaner in Westmoreland County.

In 1976, a 21-mile-long (34 km) segment of the Youghiogheny in Maryland was given special protected status by the state as the Youghiogheny Scenic & Wild River. Though most of the land along this corridor is private, it is managed by the Maryland Department of Natural Resources to preserve its natural and cultural resources.

== Recreation and travel ==
The Youghiogheny is popular for whitewater canoeing, kayaking and rafting. Four sections of the river, varying in difficulty, are available on a predictable basis for whitewater recreation:

- Top Yough, near Swallow Falls State Park in Maryland (Class IV-V)
- Upper Yough, from Sang Run to Friendsville, Maryland (Class IV-V)
- Middle Yough, from Confluence, Pennsylvania to Ohiopyle (Class II)
- Ohiopyle Falls in Ohiopyle State Park: Previously, this spectacular 18-foot (5.5 m) waterfall was legal for kayakers and canoeists to run on only one weekend a year (Class IV), during a race and festival. In August 2010, the Pennsylvania Department of Conservation and Natural Resources announced a pilot program allowing boaters to run the falls during three weeks that fall. The program was successful, so the falls are accessible to whitewater kayakers and canoeists with the same rules as the test program.
- Lower Yough, which runs through Ohiopyle State Park from Ohiopyle to Bruner Run (Class III). This section is the busiest whitewater trip east of the Mississippi River, being completed by over 250,000 people each year.
- Further downstream, near Connellsville, the river is much slower, without whitewater rapids, and is able to be piloted by personal tubes, kayaks or canoes.

Although the Youghiogheny is generally considered to be safe for whitewater recreation, there have been 19 deaths on the Lower Yough. At least five, and possibly as many as 14, of the fatalities have occurred at a rapid within the Lower Yough known as Dimple Rock. Dimple refers to both the Class III rapid by that name, as well as an undercut rock in the middle of the rapid by that name. Some of the deaths were attributed to preexisting health conditions, with 9 of the 14 being caused by the rock.

The Youghiogheny is also known for fishing, having brown and rainbow trout, as well as smallmouth above the power plant discharge. Part of the Great Allegheny Passage, a multi-use trail along the former Western Maryland Railway right-of-way, extends from Pittsburgh to Confluence. From Confluence, it connects to Washington, D.C. Amtrak's Floridian, an overnight train connecting Chicago and Miami, follows the Youghiogheny through southwest Pennsylvania into western Maryland, one of the most scenic stretches of Amtrak's national system, crossing from side to side of the river in several places.

== Images ==
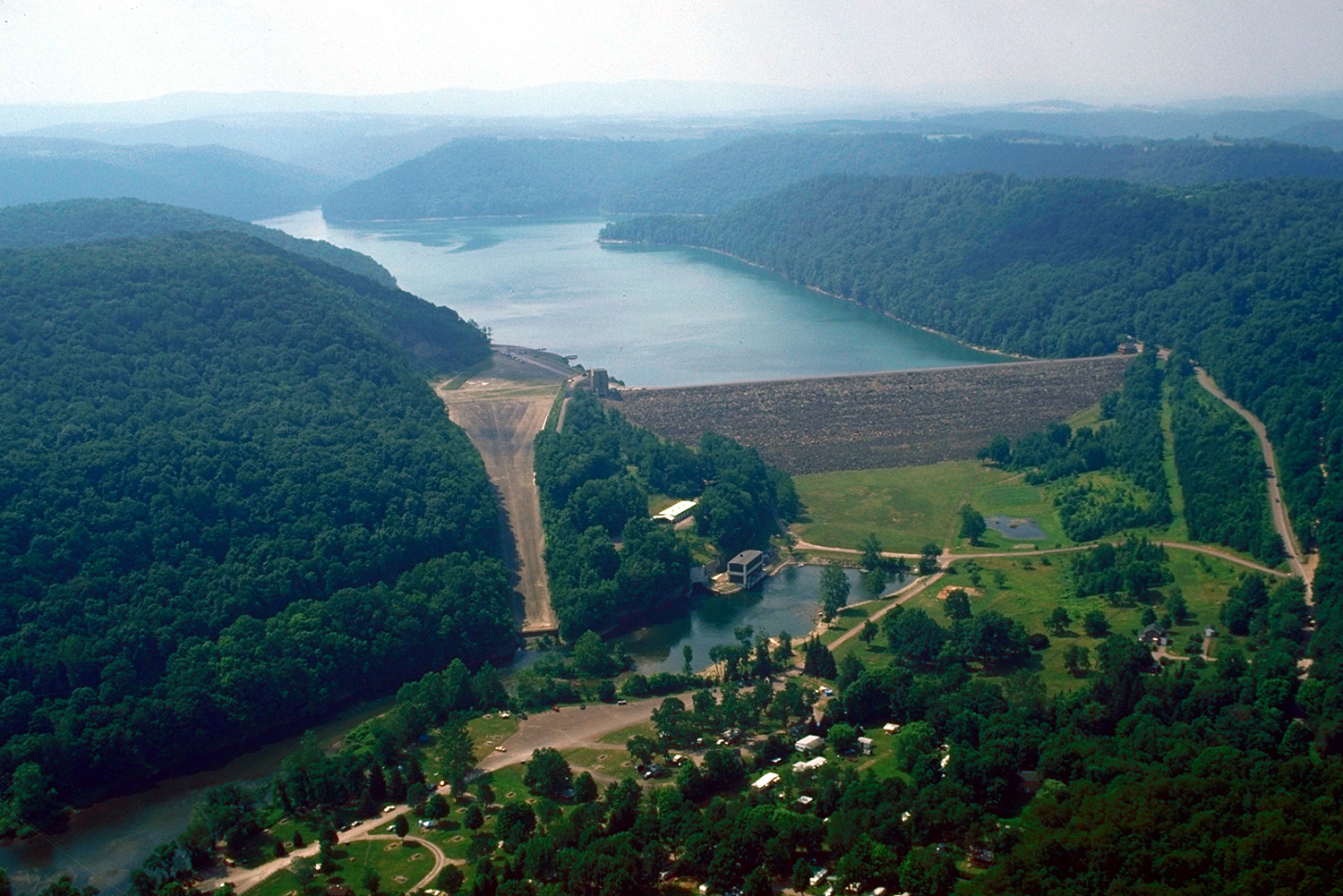
Youghiogheny Lake and Dam on the Youghiogheny River near Confluence, Pennsylvania

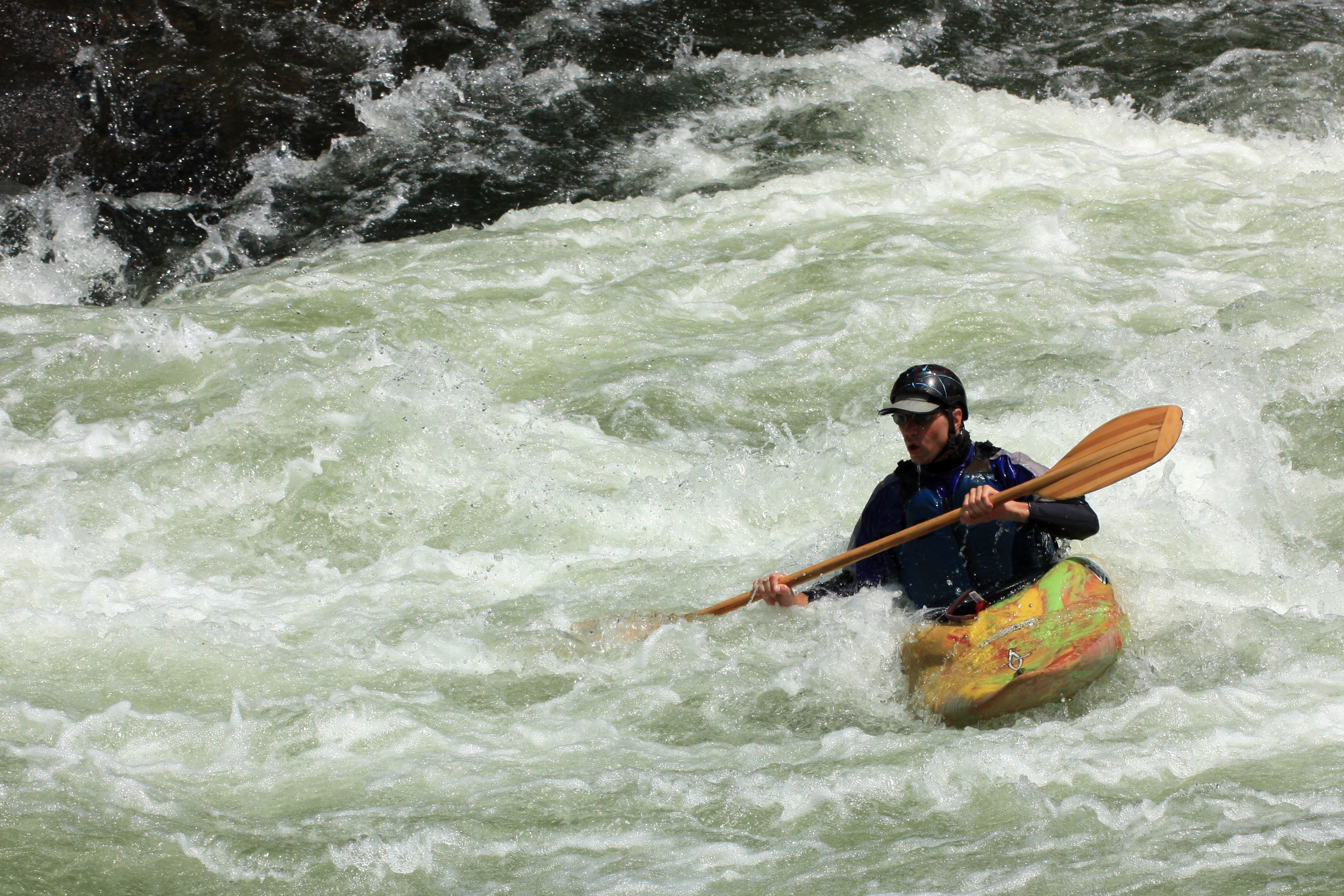
The Lower Yough: One of the most actively run sections of whitewater east of the Mississippi River

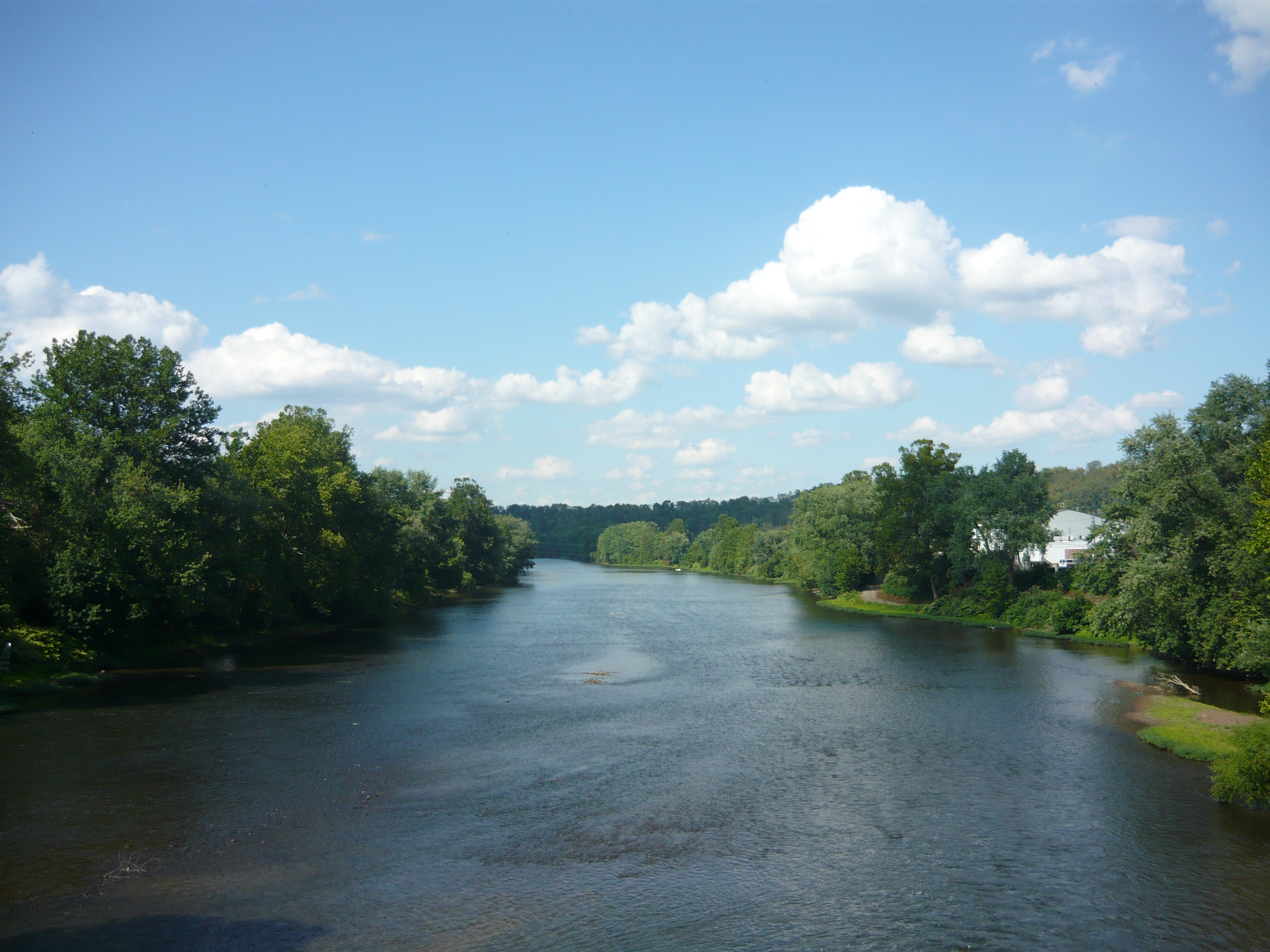
Youghiogheny River at West Newton, Pennsylvania

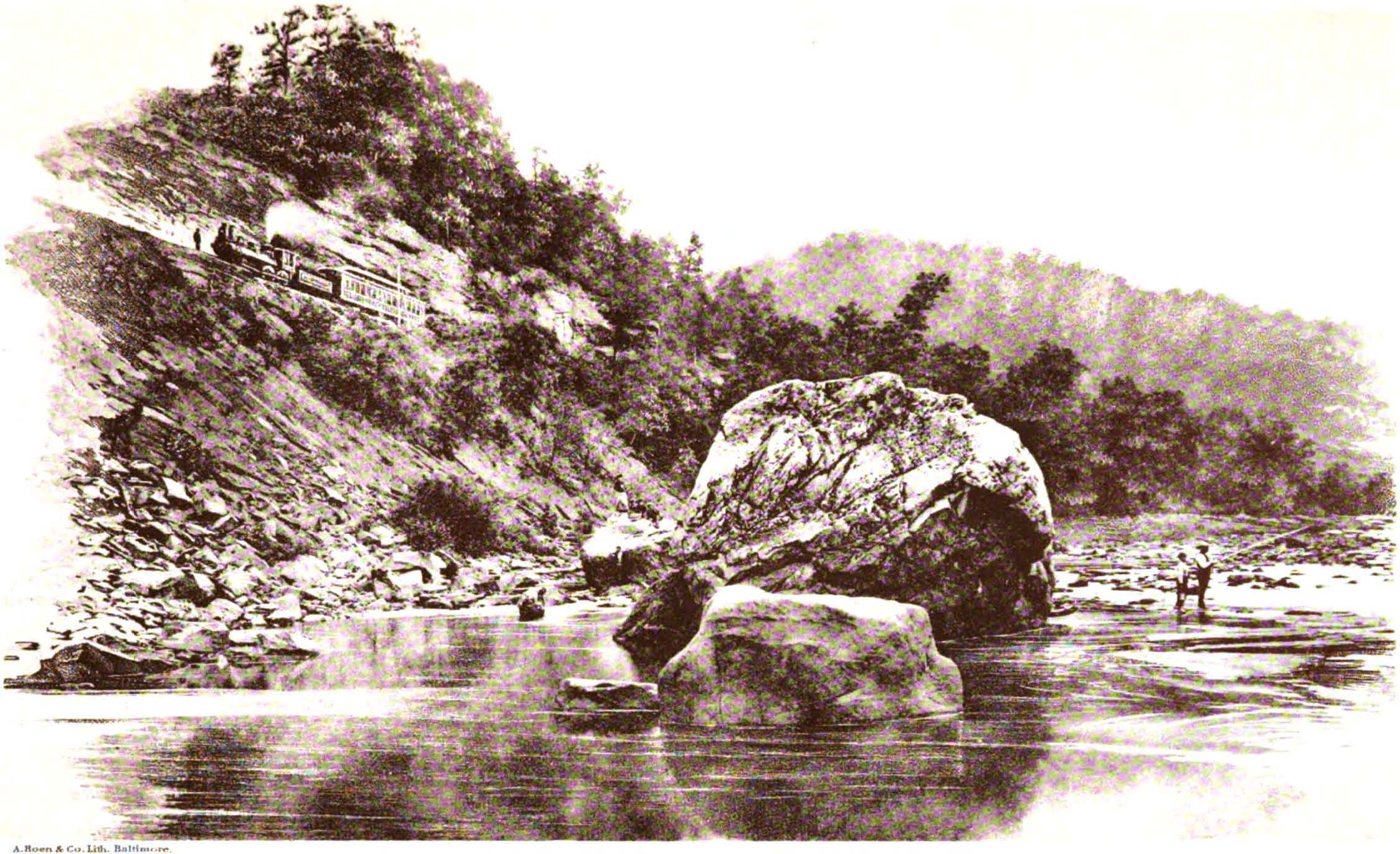
View of the Youghiogheny Valley in the Alleghany Mountains, on the Baltimore and Ohio Railroad (1898)

== Crossings ==
The Great Crossings is the place on the river where General George Washington and General Edward Braddock forded the river in 1755, during the French and Indian War.

== See also ==
- List of rivers of Maryland
- List of rivers of Pennsylvania
- List of rivers of West Virginia
- Meshach Browning (1781–1859), early backwoodsman and explorer of the Youghiogheny country
