= Leisenring, Pennsylvania =

Unincorporated community in Pennsylvania, US

- Unincorporated community
- Location within Pennsylvania
- Coordinates: 39°59′54″N 79°38′39″W
- Country: United States
- State: Pennsylvania
- County: Fayette
- Elevation: 1,053 ft (321 m)
- Time zone: UTC-5 (Eastern (EST))
  - Summer (DST): UTC-4 (EDT)
- ZIP code: 15455
- Area codes: 724, 878
- GNIS feature ID: 1179176

Leisenring is an unincorporated community in Fayette County, Pennsylvania, United States. The community is located 3.2 miles (5.1 km) west-southwest of Connellsville. The Leisenring post office carries ZIP code 15455.
