= Ramcat Run =

Stream in Pennsylvania, USA

Ramcat Run Tributary to Youghiogheny River
- Location of Ramcat Run mouth Ramcat Run (the United States)

Location
- Country: United States
- State: Pennsylvania
- County: Fayette

Physical characteristics
- Source: Laurel Run divide
  - location: about 1.5 miles southeast of Sugarloaf Knob
  - coordinates: 39°49′06″N 079°26′15″W
  - elevation: 2,570 ft (780 m)
- Mouth: Youghiogheny River
  - location: Huston, Pennsylvania
  - coordinates: 39°49′38″N 079°22′33″W
  - elevation: 1,302 ft (397 m)
- Length: 3.75 mi (6.04 km)
- Basin size: 4.06 square miles (10.5 km^{2})
- Discharge
  - location: Youghiogheny River
  - average: 8.68 cu ft/s (0.246 m^{3}/s) at mouth with Youghiogheny River

Basin features
- Progression: Youghiogheny River → Monongahela River → Ohio River → Mississippi River → Gulf of Mexico
- River system: Monongahela River
- Tributaries
  - left: unnamed tributaries
  - right: unnamed tributaries
- Bridges: Sugar Loaf Road, Fire Tower Road, Ram Cat Road (x2)

Ramcat Run is a 3.75 mi (6.04 km) long 1st order tributary to the Youghiogheny River in Fayette County, Pennsylvania.

== Course ==
Ramcat Run rises about 1.5 miles southeast of Sugar Loaf Knob, and then flows east to join the Youghiogheny River at Huston.

== Watershed ==
Ramcat Run drains 4.06 square miles (10.5 km^{2}) of area, receives about 48.7 in/year of precipitation, has a wetness index of 350.74, and is about 94% forested.

== See also ==
- List of rivers of Pennsylvania
