= Workman Run =

Stream in Pennsylvania, USA

Workman Run Tributary to Youghiogheny River
- Location of Workman Run mouth Workman Run (the United States)

Location
- Country: United States
- State: Pennsylvania
- County: Fayette

Physical characteristics
- Source: unnamed tributary to Indian Creek divide
  - location: about 0.75 miles southwest of Mill Run
  - coordinates: 39°56′38″N 079°27′48″W
  - elevation: 1,600 ft (490 m)
- Mouth: Youghiogheny River
  - location: about 2.5 miles west-southwest of Mill Run
  - coordinates: 39°56′28″N 079°29′11″W
  - elevation: 974 ft (297 m)
- Length: 1.39 mi (2.24 km)
- Basin size: 0.93 square miles (2.4 km^{2})
- Discharge
  - location: Youghiogheny River
  - average: 1.69 cu ft/s (0.048 m^{3}/s) at mouth with Youghiogheny River

Basin features
- Progression: west-southwest
- River system: Monongahela River
- Tributaries
  - left: unnamed tributaries
  - right: unnamed tributaries
- Bridges: Skinner Road

Workman Run is a 1.39 mi (2.24 km) long 1st order tributary to the Youghiogheny River in Fayette County, Pennsylvania.

== Course ==
Workman Run rises about 0.75 miles west of the community of Mill Run, and then flows west-southwest to join the Youghiogheny River about 2.5 miles west-southwest of Mill Run.

== Watershed ==
Workman Run drains 0.93 square miles (2.4 km^{2}) of area, receives about 45.7 in/year of precipitation, has a wetness index of 342.42, and is about 71% forested.

== See also ==
- List of rivers of Pennsylvania
