= Jim Run (Youghiogheny River tributary) =

Stream in Pennsylvania, USA

Jim Run Tributary to Youghiogheny River
- Location of Jim Run mouth Jim Run (Youghiogheny River tributary) (the United States)

Location
- Country: United States
- State: Pennsylvania
- County: Fayette

Physical characteristics
- Source: Stulls Run divide
  - location: about 1.5 miles east-northeast of Ohiopyle, Pennsylvania
  - coordinates: 39°52′49″N 079°27′10″W
  - elevation: 1,700 ft (520 m)
- Mouth: Youghiogheny River
  - location: about 1 mile northeast of Ohiopyle, Pennsylvania
  - coordinates: 39°52′50″N 079°28′51″W
  - elevation: 1,021 ft (311 m)
- Length: 1.11 mi (1.79 km)
- Basin size: 0.96 square miles (2.5 km^{2})
- Discharge
  - location: Youghiogheny River
  - average: 0.96 cu ft/s (0.027 m^{3}/s) at mouth with Youghiogheny River

Basin features
- Progression: west
- River system: Monongahela River
- Tributaries
  - left: unnamed tributaries
  - right: unnamed tributaries
- Bridges: PA 381

Jim Run is a 1.11 mi (1.79 km) long 1st order tributary to the Youghiogheny River in Fayette County, Pennsylvania.

== Course ==
Jim Run rises about 1.5 miles east-northeast of Ohiopyle, Pennsylvania, and then flows west to join the Youghiogheny River about 1 mile northeast of Ohiopyle.

== Watershed ==
Jim Run drains 0.96 square miles (2.5 km^{2}) of area, receives about 47.4 in/year of precipitation, has a wetness index of 342.80, and is about 88% forested.

== See also ==
- List of rivers of Pennsylvania
