= Meadow Run (Youghiogheny River tributary) =

Stream in Pennsylvania, USA

Meadow Run Tributary to Youghiogheny River
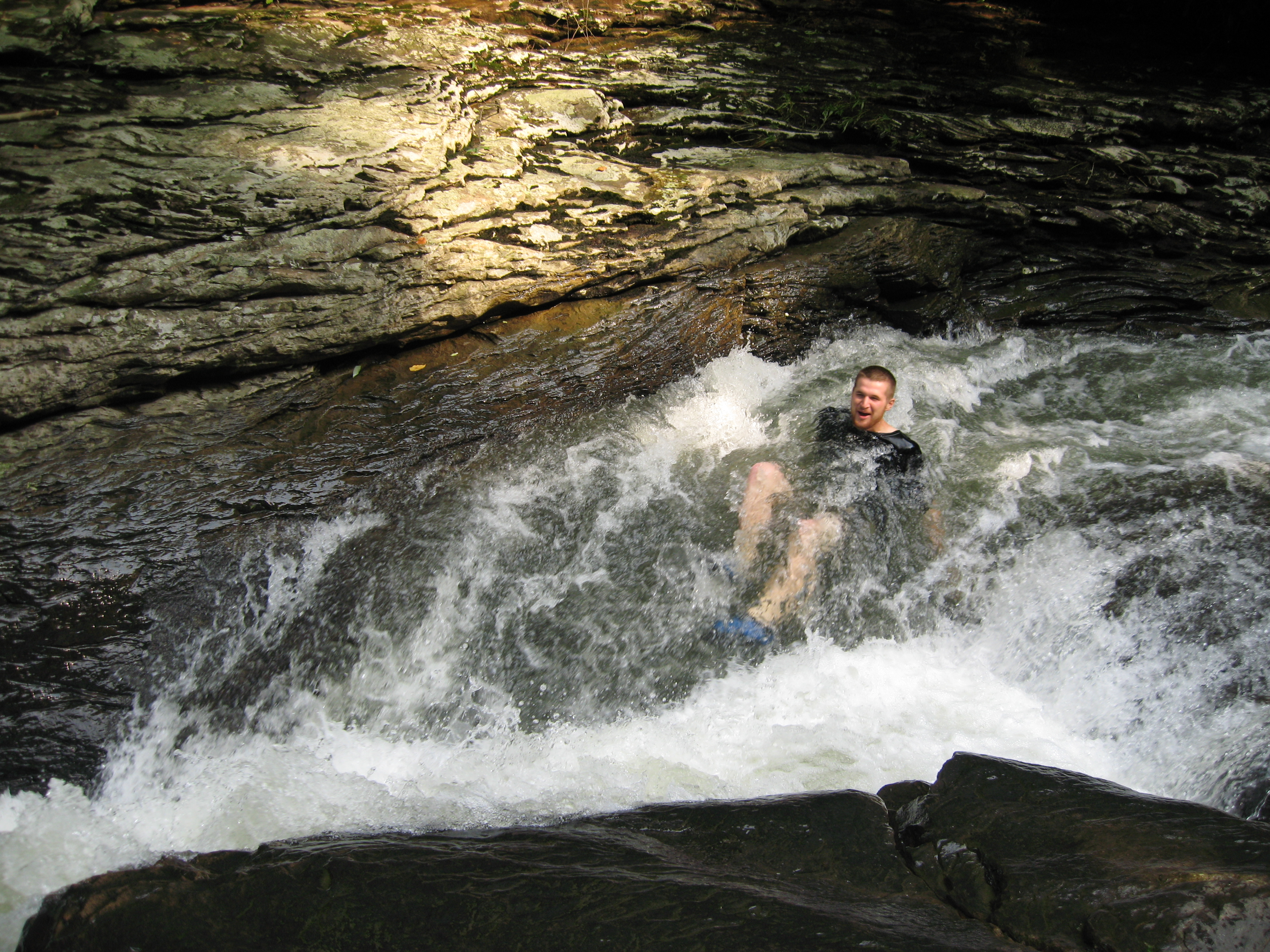
- Meadow Run Waterslide

- Location of Meadow Run mouth Meadow Run (Youghiogheny River tributary) (the United States)

Location
- Country: United States
- State: Pennsylvania
- County: Fayette
- Borough: Ohiopyle

Physical characteristics
- Source: Coolspring Run divide
  - location: about 1 mile northeast of Washington Springs, Pennsylvania
  - coordinates: 39°52′22″N 079°36′47″W
  - elevation: 2,370 ft (720 m)
- Mouth: Youghiogheny River
  - location: Ohiopyle, Pennsylvania
  - coordinates: 39°51′50″N 079°29′44″W
  - elevation: 1,050 ft (320 m)
- Length: 14.23 mi (22.90 km)
- Basin size: 41.20 square miles (106.7 km^{2})
- Discharge
  - location: Youghiogheny River
  - average: 87.34 cu ft/s (2.473 m^{3}/s) at mouth with Youghiogheny River

Basin features
- Progression: Youghiogheny River → Monongahela River → Ohio River → Mississippi River → Gulf of Mexico
- River system: Monongahela River
- Tributaries
  - left: unnamed tributaries
  - right: Deadman Run; Beaver Creek; Laurel Run
- Waterbodies: Deer Lake
- Bridges: Chalk Hill-Ohiopyle Road, Old Mill Road, Nelson Road, PA 381, Meadow Run Road, Grover Road, Meadow Run Road (x2), Dinner Bell Road, PA 381

Meadow Run is a 14.23 mi (22.90 km) long 4th order tributary to the Youghiogheny River in Fayette County, Pennsylvania.

== Variant names ==
According to the Geographic Names Information System, it has also been known historically as:

- Great Meadow Run

== Course ==
Meadow Run rises about one mile (2 km) northeast of Washington Springs, Pennsylvania, and then flows southeast and northeast to join the Youghiogheny River at Ohiopyle.

== Watershed ==
Meadow Run drains 41.20 square miles (106.7 km^{2}) of area, receives about 50.7 in (1,290 mm) per year of precipitation, has a wetness index of 376.51, and is about 82% forested.

== See also ==
- List of rivers of Pennsylvania
