= Morgan Run (Youghiogheny River tributary) =

Stream in Pennsylvania, USA

Morgan Run Tributary to Youghiogheny River
- Location of Morgan Run mouth Morgan Run (Youghiogheny River tributary) (the United States)

Location
- Country: United States
- State: Pennsylvania
- County: Fayette

Physical characteristics
- Source: Glade Run divide (Chestnut Ridge)
  - location: about 2.5 miles west of Holland Hill, Pennsylvania
  - coordinates: 39°54′12″N 079°33′17″W
  - elevation: 2,180 ft (660 m)
- Mouth: Youghiogheny River
  - location: Indian Creek, Pennsylvania
  - coordinates: 39°58′00″N 079°30′42″W
  - elevation: 958 ft (292 m)
- Length: 5.82 mi (9.37 km)
- Basin size: 5.06 square miles (13.1 km^{2})
- Discharge
  - location: Youghiogheny River
  - average: 10.62 cu ft/s (0.301 m^{3}/s) at mouth with Youghiogheny River

Basin features
- Progression: Youghiogheny River → Monongahela River → Ohio River → Mississippi River → Gulf of Mexico
- River system: Monongahela River
- Tributaries
  - left: unnamed tributaries
  - right: unnamed tributaries
- Bridges: Dunbar-Ohiopyle Road, Kingan Hill Road, Camp Carmel Road (x2)

Morgan Run is a 5.82 mi (9.37 km) long 2nd order tributary to the Youghiogheny River in Fayette County, Pennsylvania.

== Variant names ==
According to the Geographic Names Information System, it has also been known historically as:

- Laurel Run

== Course ==
Morgan Run rises about 2.5 miles west of Holland Hill, Pennsylvania, and then flows north-northwest to join the Youghiogheny River at Indian Creek.

== Watershed ==
Morgan Run drains 5.06 square miles (13.1 km^{2}) of area, receives about 48.4 in/year of precipitation, has a wetness index of 341.94, and is about 53% forested.

== Natural history ==
Morgan Run is the location of Middle Morgan Run BDA. The oak-dominated slopes along Morgan Run provide habitat for an animal species of special concern.

== See also ==
- List of rivers of Pennsylvania
