= Bruner Run =

Stream in Pennsylvania, USA

Bruner Run Tributary to Youghiogheny River
- Location of Bruner Run mouth Bruner Run (the United States)

Location
- Country: United States
- State: Pennsylvania
- County: Fayette

Physical characteristics
- Source: Jonathan Run divide
  - location: about 4 miles west-southwest of Stewarton, Pennsylvania
  - coordinates: 39°53′56″N 079°32′39″W
  - elevation: 1,975 ft (602 m)
- Mouth: Youghiogheny River
  - location: about 0.5 miles northwest of Stewarton, Pennsylvania
  - coordinates: 39°55′33″N 079°13′09″W
  - elevation: 997 ft (304 m)
- Length: 3.88 mi (6.24 km)
- Basin size: 3.44 square miles (8.9 km^{2})
- Discharge
  - location: Youghiogheny River
  - average: 7.27 cu ft/s (0.206 m^{3}/s) at mouth with Youghiogheny River

Basin features
- Progression: Youghiogheny River → Monongahela River → Ohio River → Mississippi River → Gulf of Mexico
- River system: Monongahela River
- Tributaries
  - left: unnamed tributaries
  - right: unnamed tributaries
- Bridges: Greenbriar Road

Bruner Run is a 3.88 mi (6.24 km) long 1st order tributary to the Youghiogheny River in Fayette County, Pennsylvania. This is the only stream of this name in the United States.

== Variant names ==
According to the Geographic Names Information System, it has also been known historically as:

- Haney Run

== Course ==
Bruner Run rises about 4 miles west-southwest of Stewarton, Pennsylvania, and then flows north and turns east to join the Youghiogheny River about 0.5 miles northwest of Stewarton.

== Watershed ==
Bruner Run drains 3.44 square miles (8.9 km^{2}) of area, receives about 48.4 in/year of precipitation, has a wetness index of 332.58, and is about 96% forested.

== See also ==
- List of rivers of Pennsylvania
