= Confluence, Pennsylvania =

Borough in Pennsylvania, US

- Borough
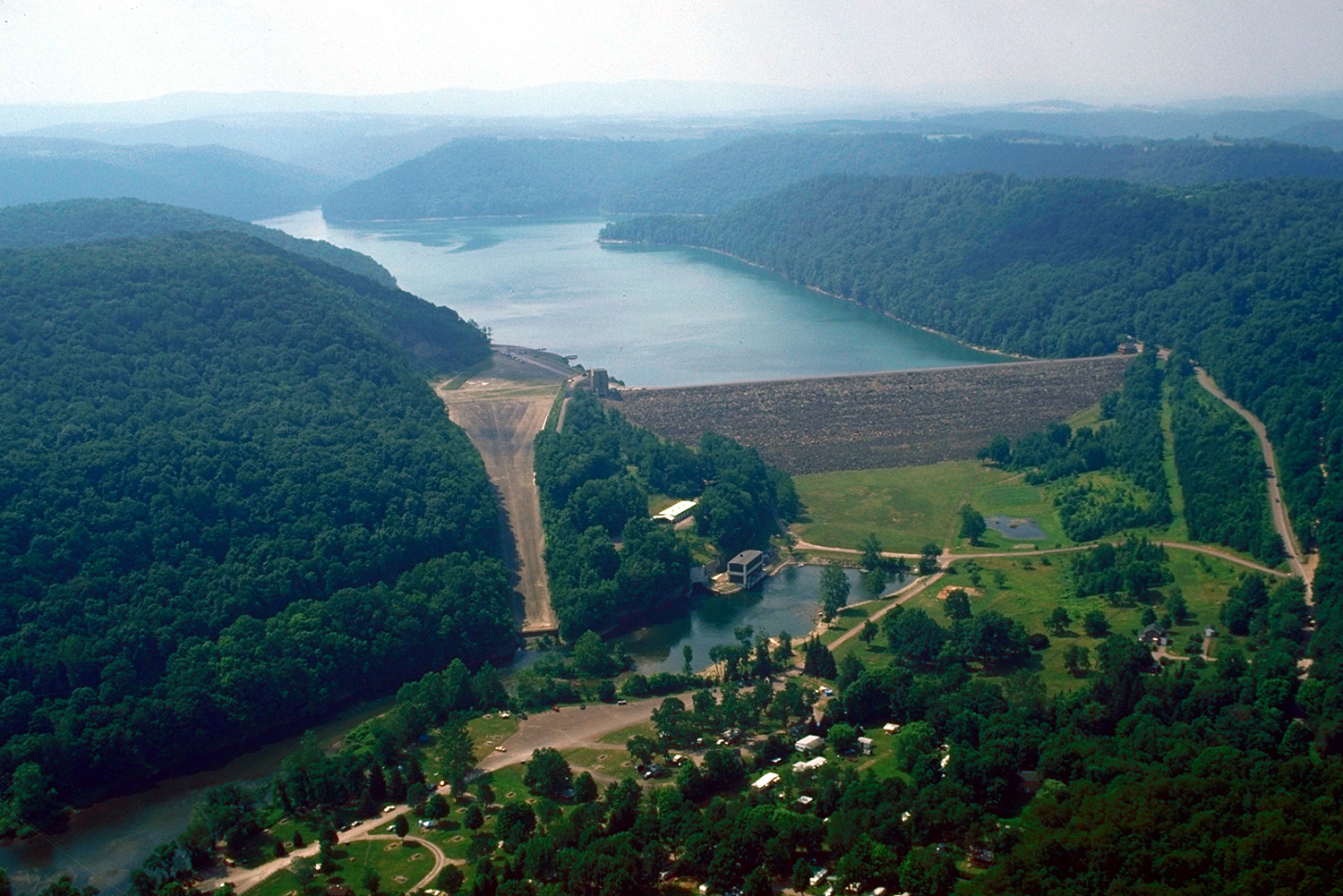

- Location of Confluence in Somerset County, Pennsylvania.

- Location within Pennsylvania
- Coordinates: 39°48′36″N 79°21′24″W
- Country: United States
- State: Pennsylvania
- County: Somerset
- Settled: 1870
- Incorporated: 1873

Government
  - Type: Borough Council

Area
  - Total: 1.68 sq mi (4.35 km^{2})
  - Land: 1.60 sq mi (4.14 km^{2})
  - Water: 0.081 sq mi (0.21 km^{2})

Population (2020)
  - Total: 722
  - Density: 451.2/sq mi (174.19/km^{2})
- Time zone: UTC-5 (Eastern (EST))
  - Summer (DST): UTC-4 (EDT)
- Zip code: 15424
- Area code: 814
- FIPS code: 42-15680

Confluence is a borough in Somerset County, Pennsylvania, United States. It is part of the Johnstown, Pennsylvania, Metropolitan Statistical Area. It was settled in 1870 and incorporated in 1873. The population was 724 at the 2020 census.

== Geography ==
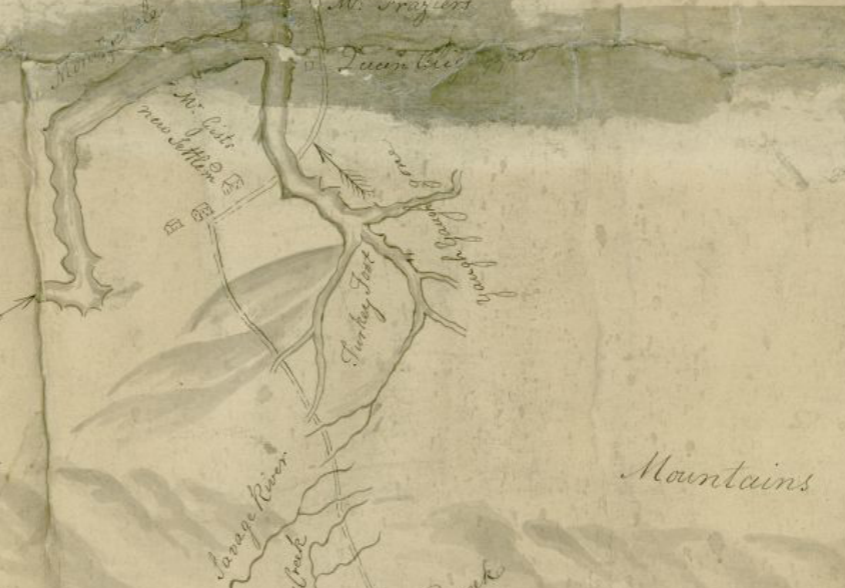
1754 map of the Confluence & Turkeyfoot region drawn by George Washington

Confluence is at 39°48′36″N 79°21′24″W (39.809997, -79.356692). The borough is located at the southern end of Lower Turkeyfoot Township, and the borough of Ursina sits to its east.

Confluence is named for the confluence of the Casselman River and Laurel Hill Creek with the Youghiogheny River. It therefore provides many opportunities for boating and fishing (and hiking, as Pennsylvania's highest point, Mount Davis, is located nearby).

According to the United States Census Bureau, the borough has a total area of 1.6 square miles (4.1 km^{2}), of which 1.6 square miles (4.1 km^{2}) is land and 0.1 square miles (0.26 km^{2}) (3.03%) is water. The borough is bordered to the south by the 2,840-acre (11.5 km^{2}) Youghiogheny River Lake and to the north by the 19,052-acre (77.10 km^{2}) Ohiopyle State Park.

=== Climate ===
The climate in this area has mild differences between highs and lows, and there is adequate rainfall year-round. According to the Köppen Climate Classification system, Confluence has a marine west coast climate, abbreviated "Cfb" on climate maps.

Climate data for Confluence 1 SW Dam, Pennsylvania (1991–2020 normals, extremes 1946–present)
| Month | Jan | Feb | Mar | Apr | May | Jun | Jul | Aug | Sep | Oct | Nov | Dec | Year |
|---|---|---|---|---|---|---|---|---|---|---|---|---|---|
| Record high °F (°C) | 76 (24) | 78 (26) | 85 (29) | 92 (33) | 93 (34) | 98 (37) | 104 (40) | 101 (38) | 99 (37) | 91 (33) | 80 (27) | 79 (26) | 104 (40) |
| Mean daily maximum °F (°C) | 36.9 (2.7) | 40.5 (4.7) | 49.5 (9.7) | 62.7 (17.1) | 72.1 (22.3) | 79.8 (26.6) | 83.5 (28.6) | 82.2 (27.9) | 76.1 (24.5) | 64.4 (18.0) | 51.8 (11.0) | 41.2 (5.1) | 61.7 (16.5) |
| Daily mean °F (°C) | 27.9 (−2.3) | 30.3 (−0.9) | 38.1 (3.4) | 49.5 (9.7) | 59.6 (15.3) | 67.8 (19.9) | 71.6 (22.0) | 70.4 (21.3) | 63.9 (17.7) | 52.3 (11.3) | 41.0 (5.0) | 32.8 (0.4) | 50.4 (10.2) |
| Mean daily minimum °F (°C) | 18.8 (−7.3) | 20.1 (−6.6) | 26.6 (−3.0) | 36.4 (2.4) | 47.0 (8.3) | 55.7 (13.2) | 59.7 (15.4) | 58.6 (14.8) | 51.7 (10.9) | 40.1 (4.5) | 30.1 (−1.1) | 24.4 (−4.2) | 39.1 (3.9) |
| Record low °F (°C) | −30 (−34) | −20 (−29) | −10 (−23) | 12 (−11) | 23 (−5) | 29 (−2) | 36 (2) | 33 (1) | 23 (−5) | 16 (−9) | 4 (−16) | −18 (−28) | −30 (−34) |
| Average precipitation inches (mm) | 3.61 (92) | 3.41 (87) | 3.90 (99) | 4.04 (103) | 4.92 (125) | 4.86 (123) | 4.54 (115) | 4.02 (102) | 3.97 (101) | 3.35 (85) | 3.07 (78) | 3.52 (89) | 47.21 (1,199) |
| Average snowfall inches (cm) | 18.3 (46) | 16.9 (43) | 10.3 (26) | 0.9 (2.3) | 0.0 (0.0) | 0.0 (0.0) | 0.0 (0.0) | 0.0 (0.0) | 0.0 (0.0) | 0.2 (0.51) | 3.7 (9.4) | 10.9 (28) | 61.2 (155) |
| Average precipitation days (≥ 0.01 in) | 17.8 | 15.2 | 14.6 | 15.2 | 16.6 | 14.6 | 13.5 | 12.6 | 12.0 | 12.1 | 12.6 | 16.0 | 172.8 |
| Average snowy days (≥ 0.1 in) | 10.2 | 8.7 | 5.1 | 1.0 | 0.0 | 0.0 | 0.0 | 0.0 | 0.0 | 0.1 | 2.2 | 6.7 | 34.0 |
Source: NOAA

== Demographics ==
Historical population
| Census | Pop. | Note | %± |
|---|---|---|---|
| 1880 | 430 | | — |
| 1890 | 444 | | 3.3% |
| 1900 | 871 | | 96.2% |
| 1910 | 890 | | 2.2% |
| 1920 | 1,031 | | 15.8% |
| 1930 | 989 | | −4.1% |
| 1940 | 1,035 | | 4.7% |
| 1950 | 1,037 | | 0.2% |
| 1960 | 938 | | −9.5% |
| 1970 | 954 | | 1.7% |
| 1980 | 968 | | 1.5% |
| 1990 | 873 | | −9.8% |
| 2000 | 834 | | −4.5% |
| 2010 | 780 | | −6.5% |
| 2020 | 722 | | −7.4% |
| 2021 (est.) | 717 | ▼ | −0.7% |

At the 2000 census there were 834 people, 349 households, and 211 families residing in the borough. The population density was 522.4 inhabitants per square mile (201.7/km^{2}). There were 404 housing units at an average density of 253.0 per square mile (97.7/km^{2}). The racial makeup of the borough was 99.52% White, 0.24% African American, and 0.24% from two or more races. Hispanic or Latino of any race were 0.24%.

Of the 349 households, 25.8% had children under the age of 18 living with them, 48.4% were married couples living together, 9.2% had a female householder with no husband present, and 39.3% were non-families. 34.4% of households were one person, and 21.8% were one person aged 65 or older. The average household size was 2.26 and the average family size was 2.91.

In the borough the population was spread out, with 20.3% under the age of 18, 7.0% from 18 to 24, 26.9% from 25 to 44, 22.7% from 45 to 64, and 23.3% 65 or older. The median age was 42 years. For every 100 females there were 84.9 males. For every 100 females age 18 and over, there were 79.7 males.

The median household income was $23,462 and the median family income was $31,181. Males had a median income of $26,705 versus $19,750 for females. The per capita income for the borough was $12,129. About 15.0% of families and 21.2% of the population were below the poverty line, including 28.7% of those under age 18 and 20.4% of those age 65 or over.

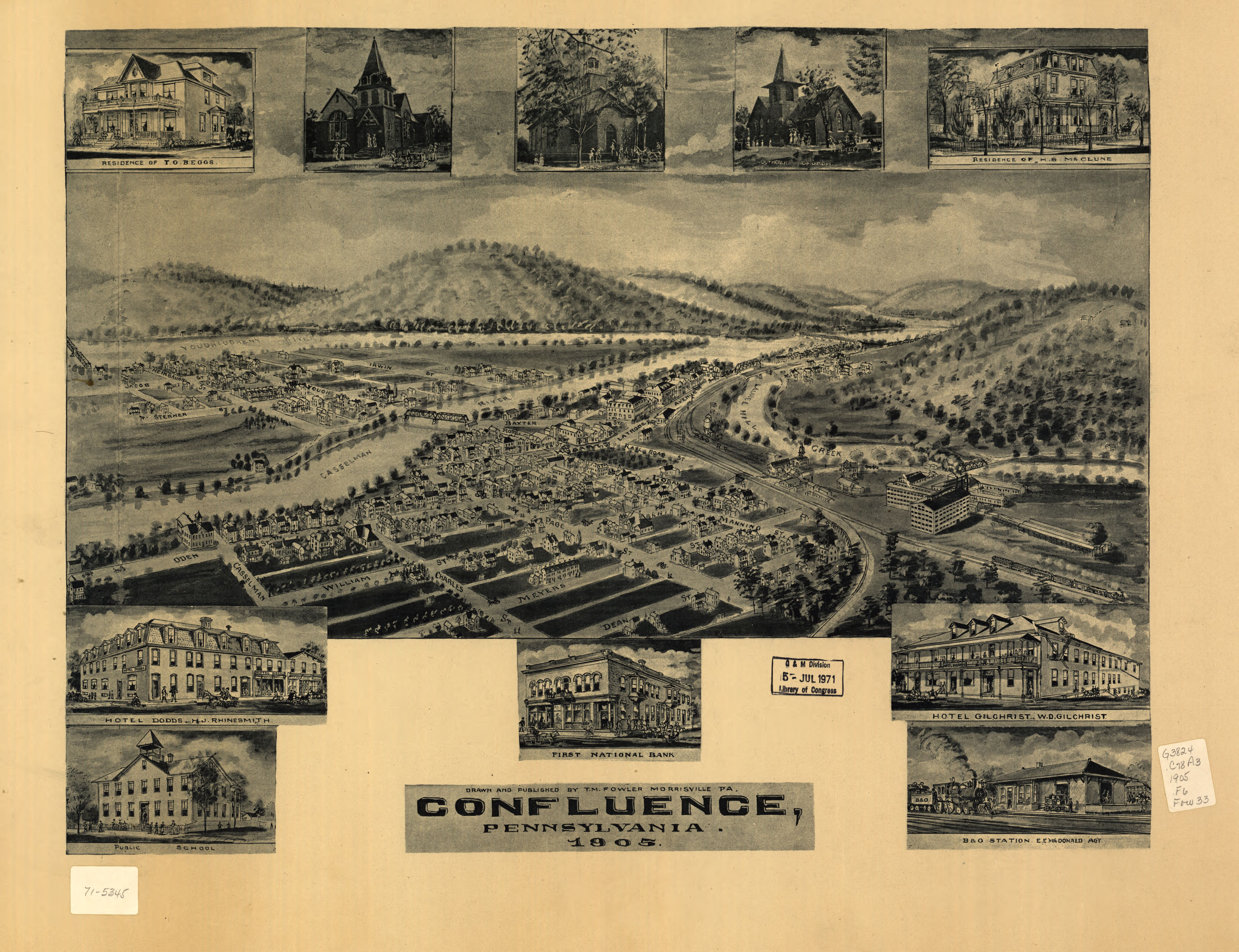
1905 bird's-eye view of Confluence
