= Youghiogheny River Lake =

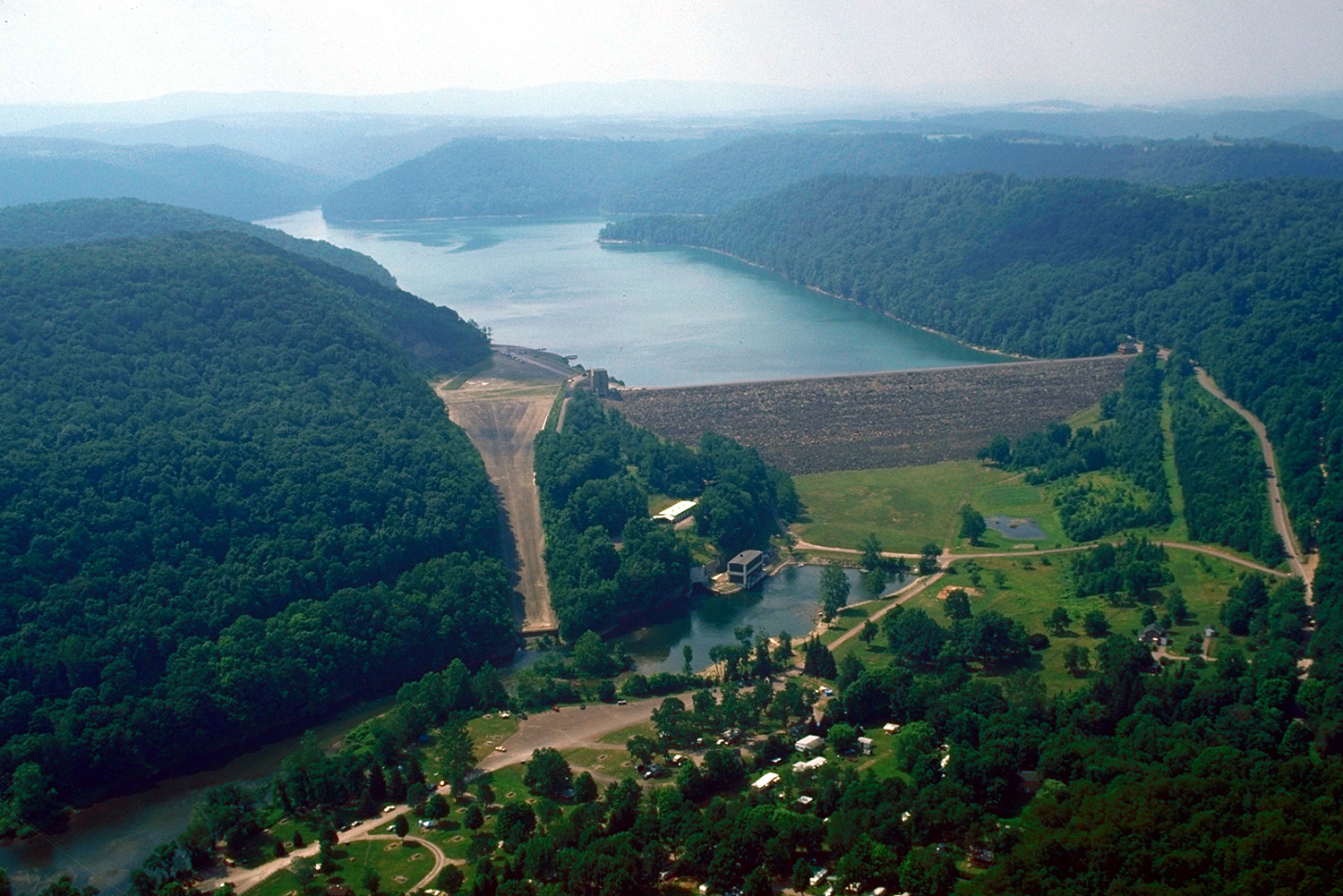
- The Youghiogheny River Lake as viewed from below the Youghiogheny Dam

- Location within Pennsylvania Location within Maryland Location within the United States
- Location: Fayette / Somerset counties, Pennsylvania, and Garrett County, Maryland
- Coordinates: 39°47′52″N 079°22′09″W
- Type: reservoir
- Primary inflows: Youghiogheny River
- Primary outflows: Youghiogheny River
- Basin countries: United States
- Max. length: 16 miles (26 km)
- Surface area: 4.4 mi^{2} (11 km^{2})
- Water volume: 149,300 acre⋅ft (0.1842 km^{3}) Normal
- Surface elevation: 1,440 ft (440 m)

The Youghiogheny River Lake is a flood control reservoir that is located in southwestern Pennsylvania and western Maryland. It is a significant tourist attraction that brings in more than one million visitors a year to the area.

== History and notable features ==
This lake was formed in 1944 by the damming of the Youghiogheny River upstream from Confluence, Pennsylvania.

The Youghiogheny Dam is an earthen structure, 184 feet (56 m) high and 1,610 feet (490 m) long at its crest, that is owned and operated by the United States Army Corps of Engineers.

The reservoir's normal surface area is approximately 4.4 square miles (11 km^{2}), and it has a maximum capacity of 300,000 acre-feet (370,000,000 m^{3}), although its normal storage level is 149,300 acre-feet (184,200,000 m^{3}).

The dam facilitates flood control, improves river flow and provides twelve megawatts of hydroelectric power.

U.S. Route 40 crosses the lake between Jockey Hollow on the Fayette County side and Somerfield on the Somerset County side.

Somerfield was laid out on the western edge of Addison Township, Somerset County circa 1816 by Philip D. Smyth, who originally named the settlement Smythfield. Somerfield was abandoned, razed, and inundated when the reservoir was filled during the 1940s.

The stone Great Crossings Bridge of the National Road, which crossed the Youghiogheny at Somerfield, is visible at extremely low water levels. The triple-arch sandstone bridge was constructed between 1815 and 1818 by James Kinkead, James Beck, and Evan Evans.

== Gallery ==
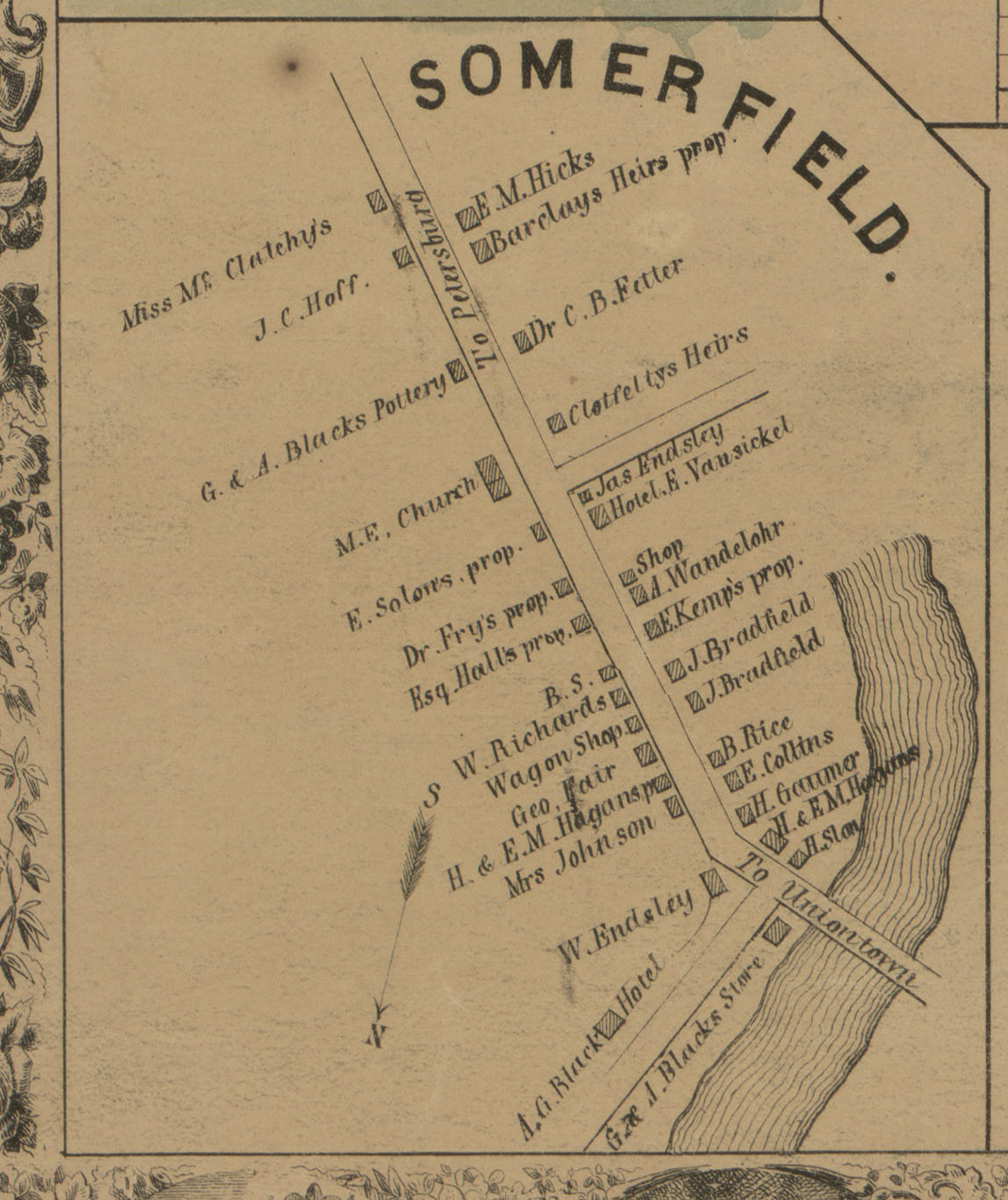
Somerfield, 1860 (note orientation of map: north at bottom)
