= National Register of Historic Places listings in Indiana County, Pennsylvania =

Location of Indiana County in Pennsylvania

This is a list of the National Register of Historic Places listings in Indiana County, Pennsylvania.

This is intended to be a complete list of the properties and districts on the National Register of Historic Places in Indiana County, Pennsylvania, United States. The locations of National Register properties and districts for which the latitude and longitude coordinates are included below, may be seen in a map.

There are 24 properties and districts listed on the National Register in the county.

This National Park Service list is complete through NPS recent listings posted March 14, 2025.

== Current listings ==
	Name on the Register	Image	Date listed	Location	Municipality	Description
1	Blairsville Armory	Blairsville Armory	December 22, 1989 (#89002069)	119 North Walnut Street; 40°25′56″N 79°15′54″W	Blairsville	
2	Breezedale	Breezedale	March 29, 1979 (#79002238)	Indiana University of Pennsylvania campus 40°37′11″N 79°09′23″W	Indiana	
3	Bridge in West Wheatfield Township	Bridge in West Wheatfield Township	June 22, 1988 (#88000774)	Legislative Route 32008 over Richards Run, northeast of Robinson; 40°24′11″N 79°07′45″W	West Wheatfield Township	
4	Buffalo, Rochester & Pittsburgh Railway Indiana Passenger Station	Buffalo, Rochester & Pittsburgh Railway Indiana Passenger Station	May 10, 1993 (#93000365)	1125 Philadelphia Street; 40°37′24″N 79°09′42″W	Indiana	
5	Silas M. Clark House	Silas M. Clark House	June 15, 1978 (#78002406)	6th Street and Wayne Avenue; 40°37′12″N 79°09′05″W	Indiana	
6	Sen. Joseph O. Clark House	Sen. Joseph O. Clark House	September 8, 2011 (#11000646)	247 1st Avenue; 40°49′01″N 78°49′35″W	Glen Campbell	
7	Commodore Historic District	Commodore Historic District	August 26, 1994 (#94001057)	Roughly bounded by Pennsylvania Route 286, Vanderbilt Avenue, Musser Street, and Fisher Avenue in Commodore; 40°42′49″N 78°56′39″W	Green Township	
8	George Diehl Homestead	George Diehl Homestead	April 30, 1987 (#87000672)	East of U.S. Route 422 on Diehl Road, east of Indiana; 40°36′29″N 78°58′43″W	Cherryhill Township	
9	Downtown Indiana Historic District	Downtown Indiana Historic District	April 29, 1993 (#93000366)	Roughly bounded by Water, 7th, and 6th Streets and Wayne Avenue; 40°37′20″N 79°09′06″W	Indiana	
10	Eliza Furnace	Eliza Furnace	September 6, 1991 (#91001138)	Lower Main Street, west of Vintondale; 40°29′03″N 78°55′20″W	Buffington Township	Extends into Cambria County
11	Graff's Market	Graff's Market	December 4, 1980 (#80003504)	27 North 6th Street; 40°37′25″N 79°09′02″W	Indiana	
12	Harmon's Covered Bridge	Harmon's Covered Bridge	August 3, 1979 (#79002242)	T-488 Over S. Branch Plum Creek; 1/8 mile South of L.R. 32072, Northeast of Willet; 40°44′02″N 79°10′31″W	Washington Township	
13	Indiana Armory	Indiana Armory	November 14, 1991 (#91001698)	621 Wayne Avenue; 40°37′11″N 79°09′05″W	Indiana	
14	Indiana Borough 1912 Municipal Building	Indiana Borough 1912 Municipal Building	September 7, 1983 (#83002247)	39 7th Street; 40°37′14″N 79°09′11″W	Indiana	
15	Kintersburg Covered Bridge	Kintersburg Covered Bridge	August 3, 1979 (#79002241)	South of Kintersburg; 40°42′48″N 79°04′53″W	Rayne Township	
16	John B. McCormick House	John B. McCormick House	May 3, 1974 (#74001787)	West of Georgeville off Pennsylvania Route 210; 40°50′19″N 79°07′00″W	South Mahoning Township	
17	James Mitchell House	James Mitchell House	December 4, 1978 (#78002407)	57 South 6th Street; 40°37′18″N 79°09′02″W	Indiana	
18	Old Indiana County Courthouse	Old Indiana County Courthouse	October 29, 1974 (#74001788)	601 Philadelphia Street; 40°37′23″N 79°09′07″W	Indiana	
19	Old Indiana County Jail and Sheriff's Office	Old Indiana County Jail and Sheriff's Office	September 27, 1979 (#79002240)	6th Street and Nixon Avenue; 40°37′23″N 79°09′08″W	Indiana	
20	St. Peter's Episcopal Church and Rectory	St. Peter's Episcopal Church and Rectory	May 9, 1988 (#88000463)	36-38 West Campbell Street; 40°25′55″N 79°15′56″W	Blairsville	
21	Saltsburg Historic District	Saltsburg Historic District	May 7, 1992 (#92000386)	Roughly west of Plum and Walnut Alleys to the Kiskiminetas River; 40°29′02″N 79°27′04″W	Saltsburg	
22	John Sutton Hall	John Sutton Hall	September 17, 1975 (#75001643)	Indiana University of Pennsylvania campus 40°37′03″N 79°09′32″W	Indiana	
23	Thomas Covered Bridge	Thomas Covered Bridge	August 3, 1979 (#79002237)	T-414 over Crooked Creek, ½ mile south of its junction with L.R. 32061, north of Fulton Run, and southwest of Creekside; 40°39′50″N 79°14′13″W	Armstrong Township	
24	Trusal Covered Bridge	Trusal Covered Bridge	August 3, 1979 (#79002243)	T-406 Over Plum Creek, 1.75 miles (2.82 km) east of Five Points, and west of Willet; 40°43′49″N 79°11′05″W	Washington Township	

== See also ==
- List of National Historic Landmarks in Pennsylvania
- National Register of Historic Places listings in Pennsylvania
- List of Pennsylvania state historical markers in Indiana County
