= Downtown Indiana Historic District =

Historic district in Pennsylvania, United States

- U.S. National Register of Historic Places
- U.S. Historic district
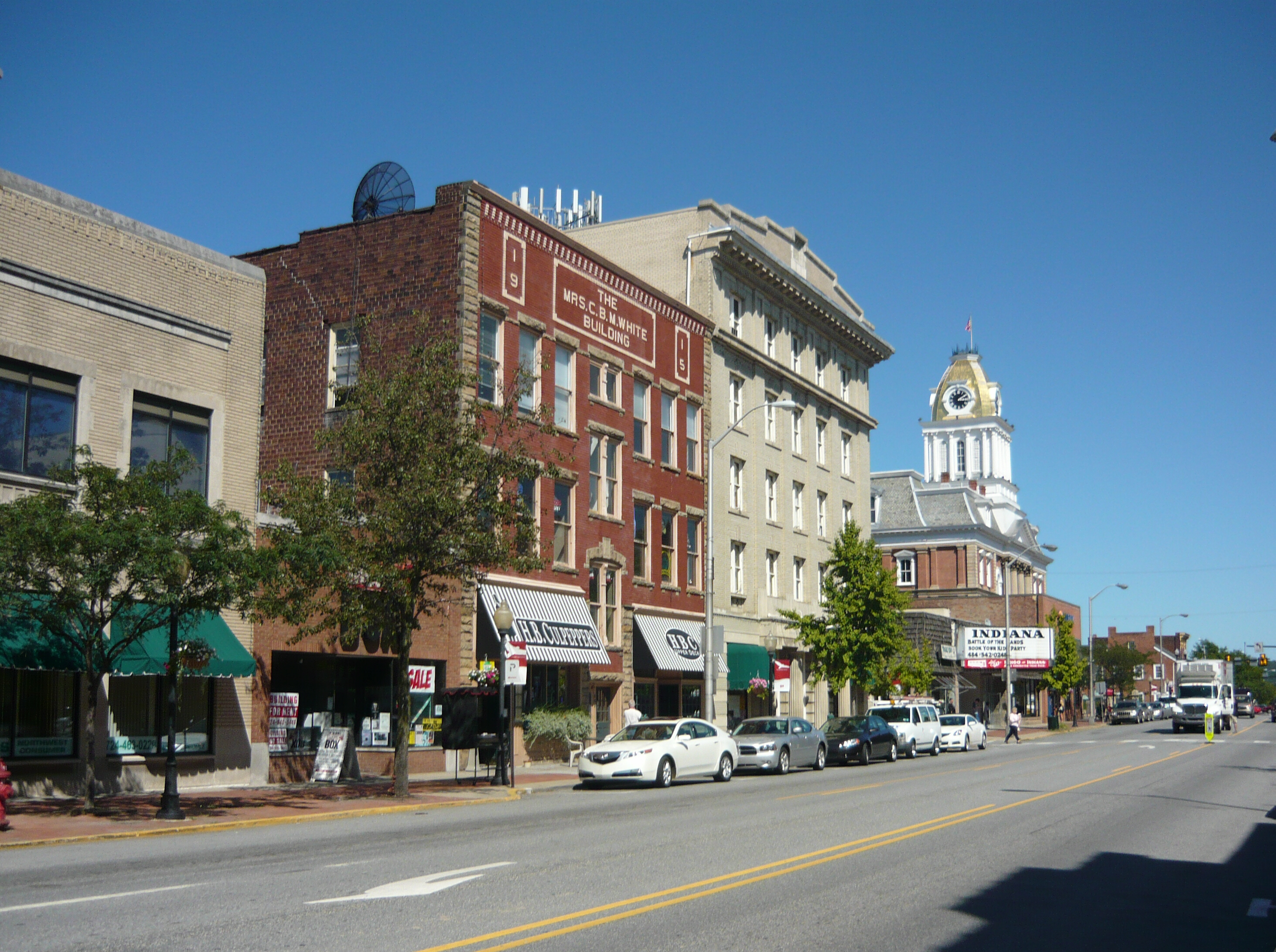
- Philadelphia Street, August 2010

- Location within Pennsylvania Location within the United States
- Location: Roughly bounded by Water, 7th and 6th Sts. and Wayne Ave., Indiana, Pennsylvania
- Coordinates: 40°37′20″N 79°9′6″W
- Area: 39.5 acres (16.0 ha)
- Built: c. 1805
- Architect: Drum, James; Conklin, Herbert
- Architectural style: Second Empire, Italianate, Queen Anne
- NRHP reference No.: 93000366
- Added to NRHP: April 29, 1993

Downtown Indiana Historic District is a national historic district located at Indiana in Indiana County, Pennsylvania. The district includes 86 contributing buildings and 1 contributing site in the central business district and surrounding residential areas of Indiana. The district includes notable examples of buildings in the Italianate, Second Empire, and Queen Anne styles. Notable buildings include the Federal-style William Houston House (c. 1805), Clawson Hotel (c. 1850–1874), Thomas Sutton House, Calvary Presbyterian Church, Zion Lutheran Church, First United Presbyterian Church, and First Methodist Episcopal Church. The contributing site is Memorial Park, established as a burial ground in the early 19th century. Located in the district and listed separately are the Silas M. Clark House, James Mitchell House, Old Indiana County Courthouse, Indiana Borough 1912 Municipal Building, Indiana Armory, and Old Indiana County Jail and Sheriff's Office.

It was listed on the National Register of Historic Places in 1993.
