= List of Pennsylvania state historical markers in Indiana County =

Location of Indiana County in Pennsylvania

This is a list of the Pennsylvania state historical markers in Indiana County.

This is intended to be a complete list of the official state historical markers placed in Indiana County, Pennsylvania by the Pennsylvania Historical and Museum Commission (PHMC). The locations of the historical markers, as well as the latitude and longitude coordinates as provided by the PHMC's database, are included below when available. There are 16 historical markers located in Indiana County.

== Historical markers ==
Marker title	Image	Date dedicated	Location	Marker type	Topics
Jim Nance		November 3, 2018	Philadelphia Street, Indiana; 40.577917°N 79.133133°W	Roadside	African American, Football Player
Absalom (Albert) Hazlett (1837-1860)		March 27, 2009	South 6th Street extension (PA 954) (near PA Barbeque), Indiana; 40.577917°N 79.133133°W	Roadside	African American, Civil War, Military
Dr. Robert Mitchell (1786-1863)		October 17, 2007	Franklin Street (PA 286) near 2nd Street (PA 403), Clymer; 40.672750°N 79.006633°W	Roadside	African American, Underground Railroad
Edward Abbey		September 28, 1996	Buffalo-Pittsburgh Highway (US 119) at N end of Home; 40.73465°N 79.10432°W	Roadside	Environment, Writers
Fugitive Slave Rescue		April 17, 2004	West Market Street at Liberty Street, Blairsville (MISSING)	City	African American, Government & Politics 19th Century, Underground Railroad
Indiana County		September 10, 1982	New Courthouse Square, 8th & Philadelphia Streets, Indiana; 40.62307°N 79.15523°W	City	Government & Politics, Government & Politics 19th Century
James Maitland Stewart (1908-1997)		July 2, 1998	Jimmy Stewart Museum, 9th & Philadelphia Streets, Indiana; 40.62312°N 79.156°W	Roadside	Military, Military Post-Civil War, Motion Pictures & Television, Performers
John B. McCormick		September 15, 1951	US 22 just west of Armagh (MISSING-POST EXISTS); 40.454255°N 79.039186°W	Roadside	Business & Industry, Entrepreneurs, Invention
John S. Fisher		September 14, 1950	Junction PA 85 & 210 E of Plumville; 40.7944°N 79.16645°W -->	Roadside	Government & Politics, Government & Politics 20th Century, Governors
Linton Park (1826-1906)		September 27, 2008	At Linton Park, North Manor Street, Marion Center; 40.771169°N 79.049785°W	Roadside	Agriculture, Artists, Labor
Moorhead's Fort		July 9, 1951	Philadelphia Street & Heritage Run Road, .6 mile W of Indiana	Roadside	American Revolution, French & Indian War, Military, Native American
Purchase of 1768		July 2, 1948	US 219 at Cherry Tree (MISSING)	Roadside	Government & Politics, Native American
Rescue of Anthony Hollingsworth, The		September 27, 2002	Philadelphia Street (PA 286) & North 6th Street, Indiana; 40.623083°N 79.151067°W	City	African American, Underground Railroad
Rossiter Strike Injunction		September 6, 2004	Shaffer Field, Central Street at West Side Street, Rossiter; 40.896200°N 78.935633°W	Roadside	Coal, Government & Politics 20th Century, Labor
Rural Electrification		1988	Airport Road, just off PA 286 at E end of Indiana.632850°N 79.118683°W	Roadside	Business & Industry, Electricity
Saltsburg		February 4, 1984	Washington Street (PA 286) at Canal Street, Saltsburg; 40.48618°N 79.45203°W	City	Business & Industry, Cities & Towns
William H. Sylvis		September 1, 1990	Keith Hall, Indiana University of Pennsylvania, Indiana; 40.618250°N 79.156417°W	City	Labor

== See also ==
- List of Pennsylvania state historical markers
- National Register of Historic Places listings in Indiana County, Pennsylvania
