= Henry W. Majlinger =

American football and baseball coach (1919–1999)

- Majlinger pictured in The Dial 1954, Central Connecticut yearbook

Biographical details
- Born: December 27, 1919; Glen Campbell, Pennsylvania, U.S.
- Died: September 8, 1999 (aged 79); New Britain, Connecticut, U.S.

Playing career

Football
- 1946: NYU
- Position: Tackle

Coaching career (HC unless noted)

Football
- 1948–1952: Connecticut Teachers (assistant)
- 1953–1958: Connecticut Teachers

Baseball
- 1949–1978: Connecticut Teachers / Central Connecticut

Head coaching record
- Overall: 17–22–2 (football); 353–168 (baseball)

Henry W. Majlinger (December 27, 1919 – September 8, 1999) was an American football and baseball coach. He was the third head football coach at the Teachers College of Connecticut—now known as Central Connecticut State University—, serving for six seasons, from 1953 to 1958, and compiling a record of 17–22–2. Majlinger was also the head baseball coach at Central Connecticut from 1949 to 1978, tallying a mark of 353–168.

== Head coaching record ==
=== Football ===
Year	Team	Overall	Conference	Standing	Bowl/playoffs
Connecticut Teachers Blue Devils (Independent) (1953–1958)
1953	Connecticut Teachers	1–4			
1954	Connecticut Teachers	6–0			
1955	Connecticut Teachers	4–3			
1956	Connecticut Teachers	3–3			
1957	Connecticut Teachers	3–5			
1958	Connecticut Teachers	0–7–1			
Connecticut Teachers:		17–22–2			
Total:		17–22–2			
