= M. C. Eignus =

American politician

Melancthon C. Eignus (May 25, 1844 – August 21, 1941) was an American Methodist Episcopal Church clergyman and politician.

Eignus was born in Blairsville, Pennsylvania. He studied in Moline, Illinois and at Henry College. He was ordained to the ministry for the Methodist Episcopal Church. Eignus served in the 89th Illinois Infantry Regiment during the American Civil War. In 1883, Eignus moved to a farm in Forrest, Illinois. Eignus was the editor of the Forrest Rambler newspaper. He served on the Forrest Village Board and was a Republican. Eignus served in the Illinois House of Representatives from 1897 to 1901. Eignus retired from the ministry in 1919. He died at his daughter's home in Forrest, Illinois.
