= Indiana Weekly Messenger =

Former American newspaper

- Type: Weekly newspaper
- Founded: 1856
- Language: English
- Headquarters: Indiana, Pennsylvania

The Indiana Weekly Messenger was an American newspaper that was published in Indiana, Pennsylvania from 1856 to 1946.

== History ==
Originally named the Democratic Messenger, this newspaper was established in 1856 by Joseph M. Thompson, Silas M. Clark and John F. Young as a Democratic organ, and favored the election of James Buchanan for the office of president of the United States. In the spring of 1857, Clark Wilson of Clearfield County purchased the publication, and continued to conduct it in the interest of the same party until the summer of 1860, when he sold a half interest in the office to Samuel A. Smith.

While under the leadership of Wilson and Smith, who respectively were a Democrat and Republican, this publication dropped its political slant and became an independent sheet. Around this time, its title was altered to The Indiana Messenger.

Smith and Wilson continued to publish this newspaper until 1862, when J. Willis Westlake purchased Wilson's interest. The new firm then announced that future editions of the publication would espouse the cause of the Republican Party. In 1865, Westlake was succeeded by his partner's father, ex-sheriff Joseph R. Smith. The firm's name was then changed to J. R. Smith & Son. Ownership of the paper remained with the Smith family at least into the 1920s.

This newspaper bore the title Indiana Weekly Messenger from 1874 until its discontinuance in 1946.
