= Holyoke Machine Company =

American machinery company

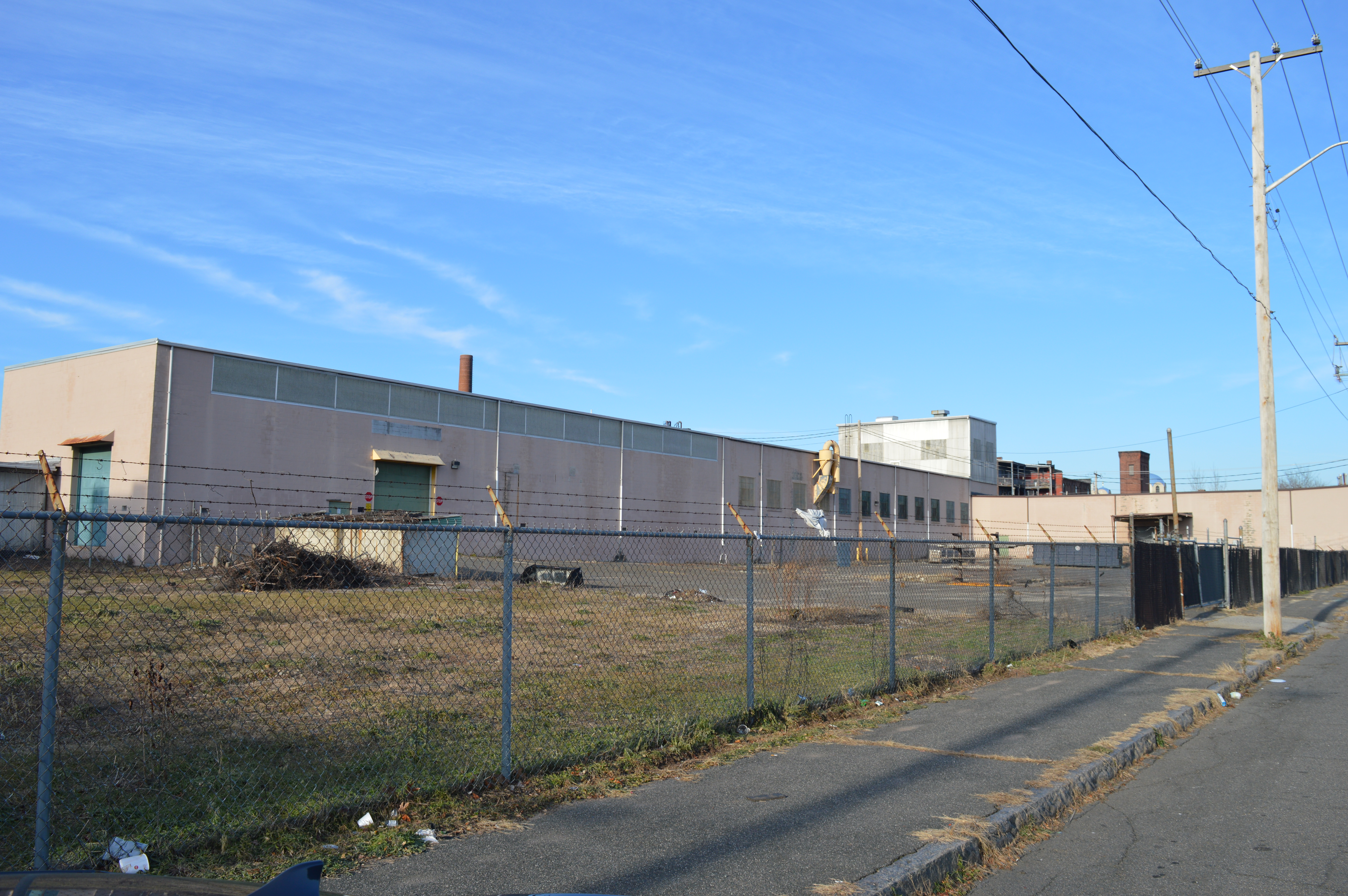
- Freight yard of the former Holyoke Machine Company, 2018
- Company type: Privately-held
- Industry: Machine industry, miscellaneous heavy industry
- Founded: 1863
- Defunct: August 2017
- Headquarters: 514 Main Street, Holyoke, Massachusetts, United States
- Area served: Worldwide
- Key people: Stephen Holman (founder)
- Website: holyokemachine.com

The Holyoke Machine Company was an American manufacturer of industrial machinery, best known for its work in paper manufacturing equipment and water turbines.

== History ==
The company, formed in 1863, was founded by Nathan H. Whitten, T.C. Page, T. B. Flanders, Richard Pattee, and S. S. Chase, after the Holyoke Water Power Company's machine shop had been sold off. Stephen Holman, the company's treasurer, president, and largest shareholder during different times in its first decade, is credited as its founder, though the nature of his early involvement is not well documented. Holman would purchase the company's foundry works in Worcester in April 1873, a second manufacturing branch which remained open for several decades.

The best known among turbines manufactured by the company was the Hercules turbine; a design developed by engineer John B. McCormick, who improved upon the Francis turbine, it was the first true mixed flow turbine of a high efficiency. With a maximum efficiency of 87%, a considerable improvement over previous designs of the era, the turbine would become ubiquitous in mills in the United States, as well as Europe.

The central location of the company, and its design improvements for various papermaking machinery such as Fourdrinier machines, contributed to the paper making and textile economy of Massachusetts and more specifically the paper industry of the Berkshires, granting ready-access to machinery that often had to be shipped great distances from other manufacturers. In addition to turbines and papermaking machinery, the company was also known to have produced a wide variety of cast parts and custom orders. Among those known were Thomas Edison's personal elevator at his Orange, New Jersey laboratory, as well as doors for the US Capitol Building.

== Dissolution ==
With a changing market steering away from 19th century water-turbine factories, the business went into decline and entered bankruptcy in 1948, when it was bought by Irwin Sagalyn, who closed its foundry and changed the business's focus. At the end of 1950 the company auctioned off all of its remaining tools for the purposes of manufacturing turbines, papermaking tools and other mechanical machinery, choosing to focus entirely on its precision roll and filter business in the paper and textile industries. Citing the shrinking of an American industrial base, changes in technology and its specialization in those industries, Irwin's son, owner James Sagalyn, dissolved the company in August 2017, leaving one competitor working on the same technology, Badger Roll and Machine of Green Bay, Wisconsin to handle remaining customers, many in the Greater Springfield area.
