= Old Indiana County Jail and Sheriff's Office =

Historic government buildings in Pennsylvania, United States

- U.S. National Register of Historic Places
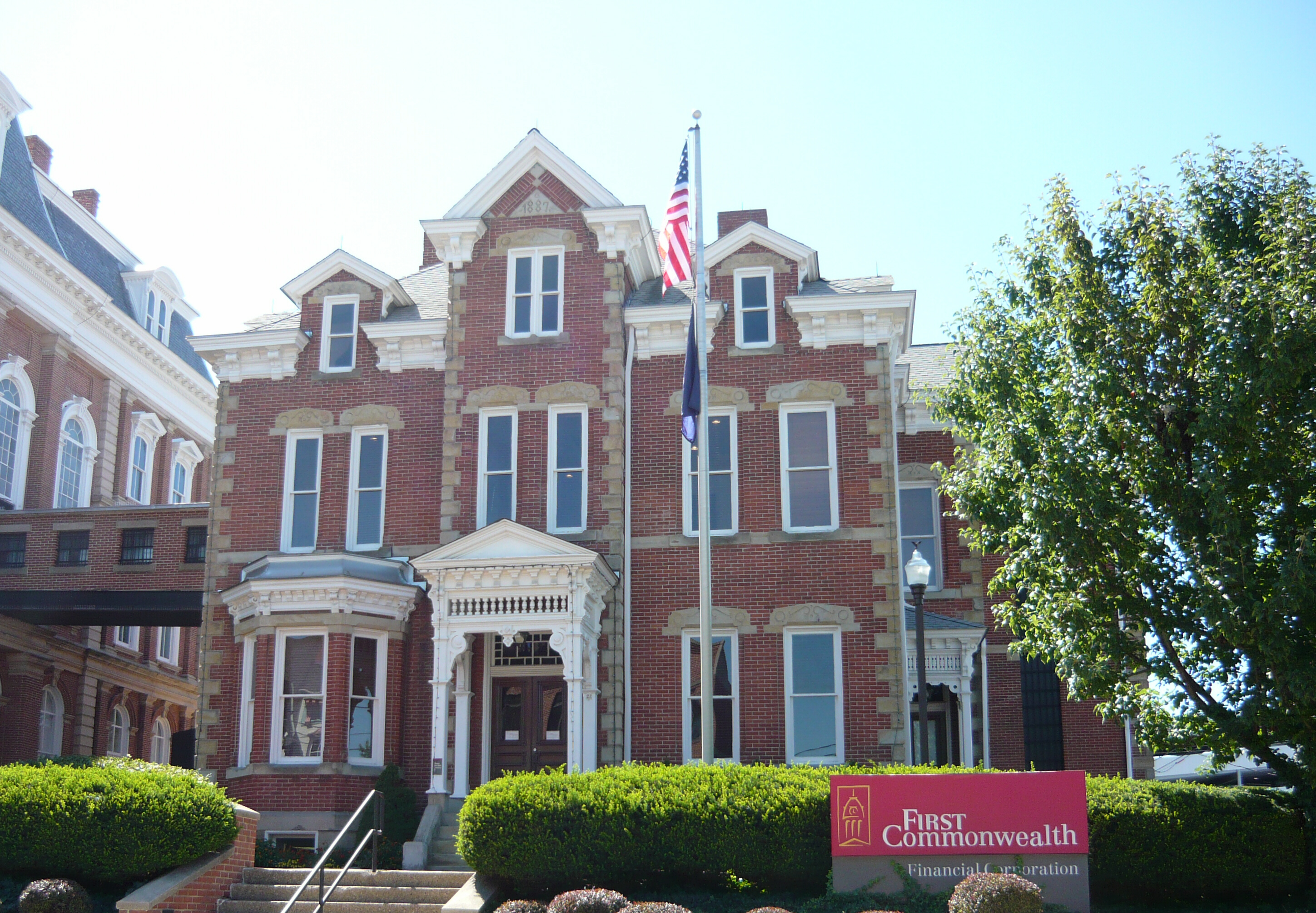
- Old Indiana County Jail and Sheriff's Office, August 2010

- Location within Pennsylvania Location within the United States
- Location: 6th St. and Nixon Ave., Indiana, Pennsylvania
- Coordinates: 40°37′23″N 79°9′8″W
- Area: 0.3 acres (0.12 ha)
- Built: 1887-1888
- Architect: C.H. Sparks, John S. Hastings
- Architectural style: Italianate
- NRHP reference No.: 79002240
- Added to NRHP: September 27, 1979

The Old Indiana County Jail and Sheriff's Office is an historic jail and Sheriff's office complex in Indiana, Indiana County, Pennsylvania, United States.

It was added to the National Register of Historic Places in 1979.

== History and architectural features ==
This complex consists of two structures that were built between 1887 and 1888. They are brick buildings that were designed in the Italianate-style. The jail is attached to the rear of the Sheriff's Office, also known as the Sheriff's House. They are connected to the Old Indiana County Courthouse by a second floor pedestrian bridge.
