= Sen. Joseph O. Clark House =

Historic house in Pennsylvania, United States

- U.S. National Register of Historic Places
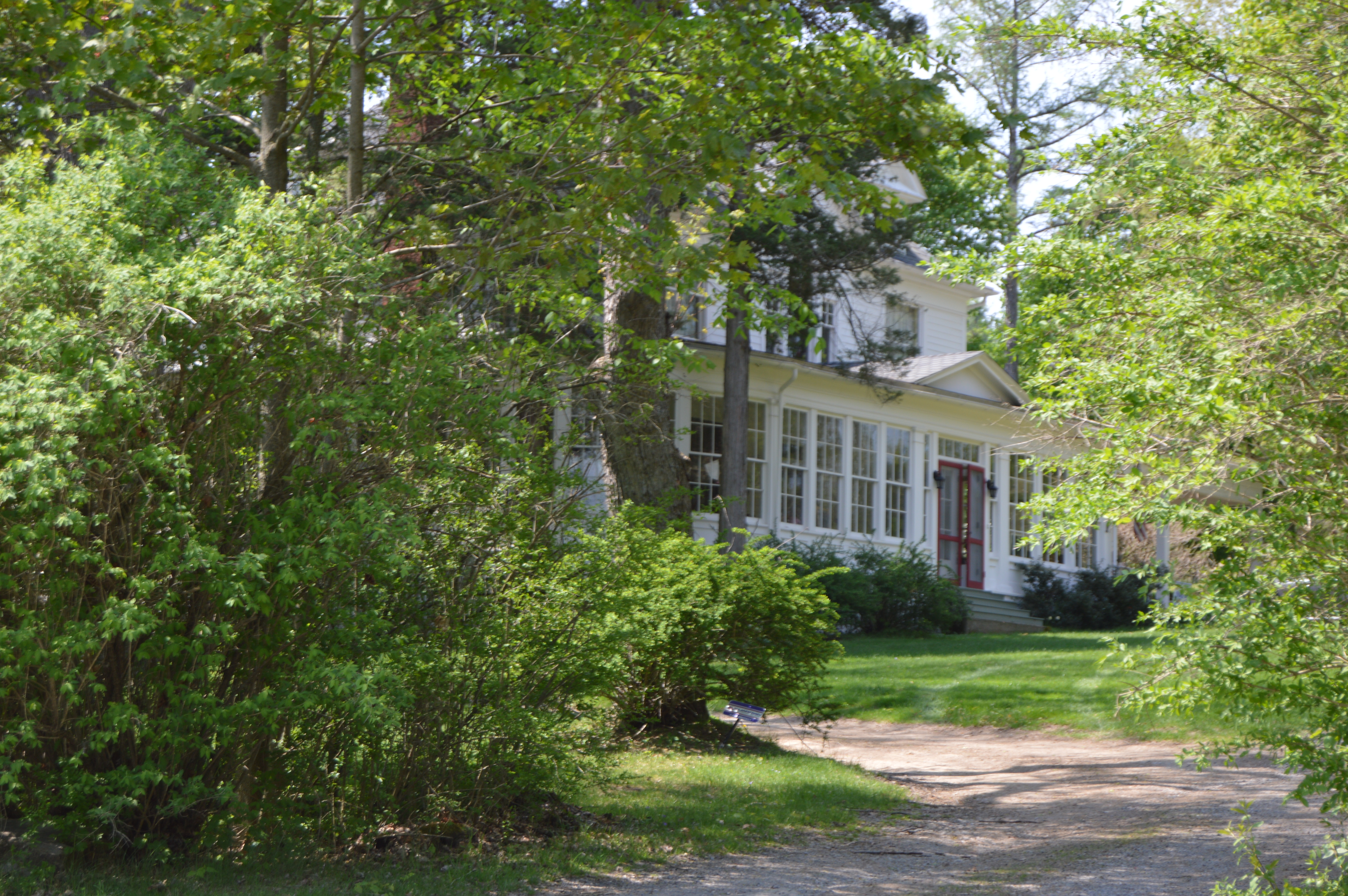
- Seen from the street

- Location within Pennsylvania Location within the United States
- Location: 247 First Ave., Glen Campbell, Pennsylvania
- Coordinates: 40°49′1.2″N 78°49′35″W
- Built: 1901
- Architectural style: Colonial Revival
- NRHP reference No.: 11000646
- Added to NRHP: September 8, 2011

Sen. Joseph O. Clark House is a historic home located at Glen Campbell, Indiana County, Pennsylvania. It was built between 1900 and 1924, and is in the Colonial Revival-style.

It was added to the National Register of Historic Places in 2011.
