= Indiana, Pennsylvania =

Borough in Pennsylvania, US

- Borough
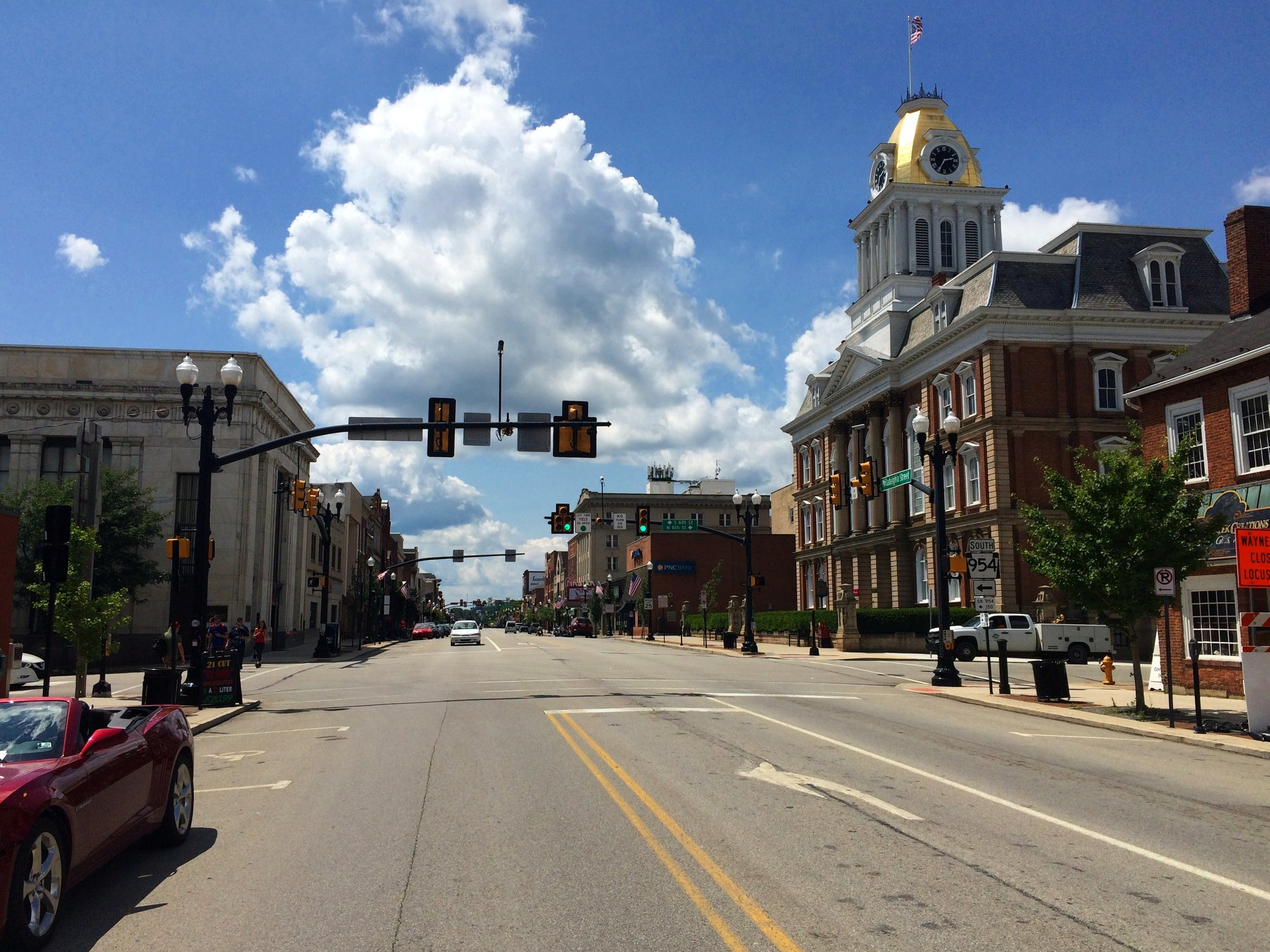
- Downtown Indiana Historic District

- Flag Seal

- Location of Indiana in Indiana County, Pennsylvania

- Location within Pennsylvania Location within the United States
- Coordinates: 40°37′N 79°9′W
- Country: United States
- State: Pennsylvania
- County: Indiana
- Settled: 1805
- Incorporated: 1816

Government
  - Type: Council–manager
  - Mayor: Charles Simelton
  - Manager: Nichole Sipos

Area
  - Total: 1.76 sq mi (4.57 km^{2})
  - Land: 1.76 sq mi (4.56 km^{2})
  - Water: 0.0039 sq mi (0.01 km^{2})
- Elevation: 1,301 ft (397 m)

Population (2020)
  - Total: 14,044
  - Density: 7,982.8/sq mi (3,082.17/km^{2})
- Time zone: UTC-5 (Eastern (EST))
  - Summer (DST): UTC-4 (EDT)
- ZIP Code: 15701
- FIPS code: 42-36816
- Website: www.indianaboro.com

Indiana is a borough in Indiana County, Pennsylvania, United States, and its county seat. The population was 14,044 at the 2020 census. It is the principal city of the Indiana, Pennsylvania micropolitan area, about 46 miles (74 km) northeast of Pittsburgh. It is a part of the greater Pittsburgh–New Castle–Weirton combined statistical area, as well as the Johnstown and Pittsburgh media markets.

The borough and the region as a whole promote itself as the "Christmas Tree Capital of the World" because the national Christmas Tree Growers Association was founded there. There are still many Christmas tree farms in the area. The largest employer in the borough today is Indiana University of Pennsylvania, the second-largest of 14 PASSHE schools in the state.

== History ==
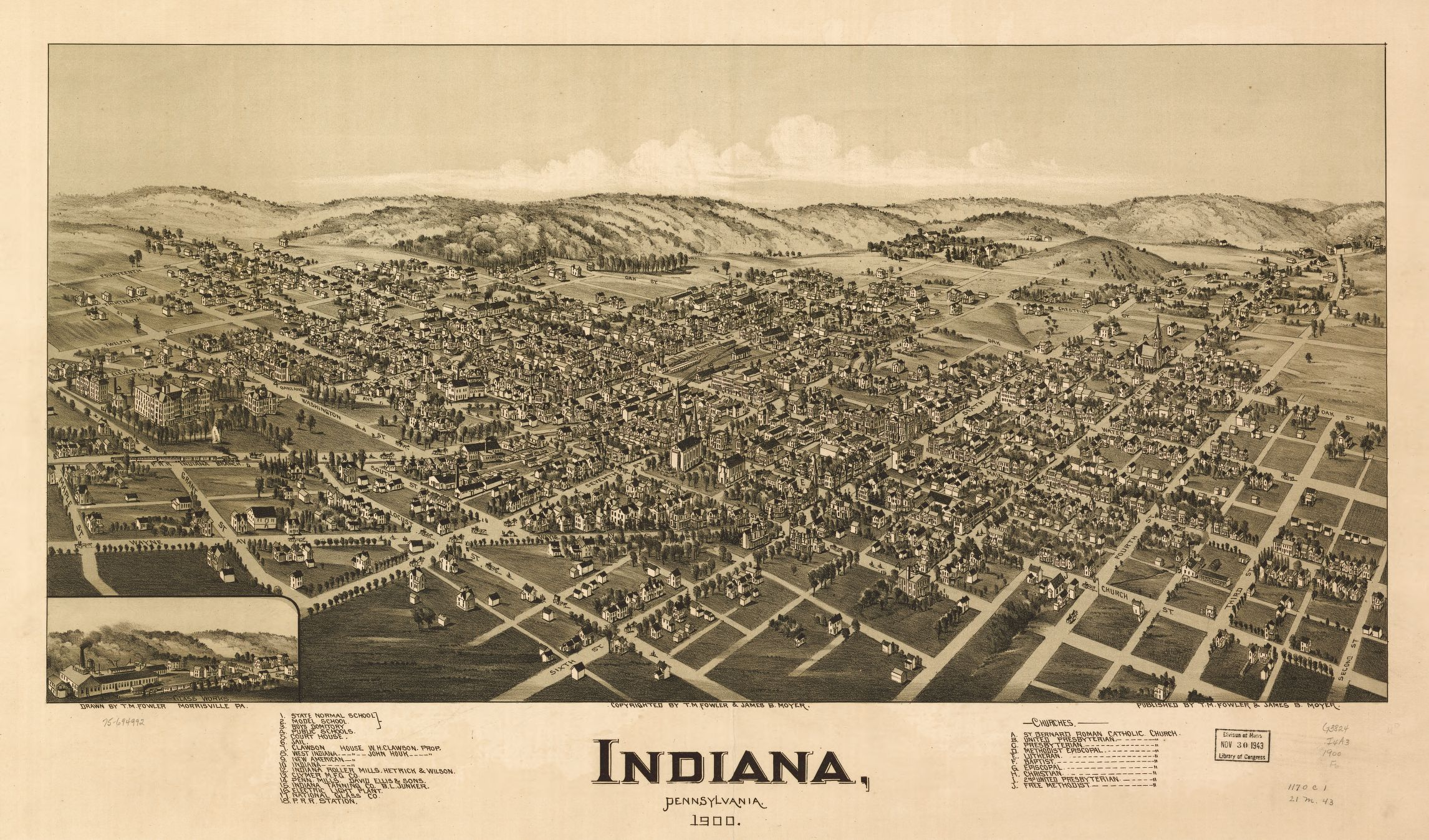
Indiana in 1900

In 1768, Thomas and Richard Penn, sons of William Penn, secured the southern part of what would later become Indiana County from the Iroquois Six Nations through the First Treaty of Fort Stanwix. Indiana takes its name from Indiana County, which in turn gets its name from the "Indiana grant" of the First Treaty of Fort Stanwix. Indiana was founded in 1805 to be the new county's seat from a grant of land by Founding Father George Clymer. By 1810, it had a population of 125.

On at least one occasion, an anti-slavery mob in Indiana rescued a fugitive slave from extradition back to slavery in the South. The town was also where James Moorhead, a local abolitionist leader, published several anti-slavery newspapers. The first of these was The Clarion of Freedom, founded in 1843. Moorhead eventually sold the Clarion and founded a new anti-slavery paper, the Indiana Independent, which he published until his death in 1857. The Independent was published by his son J. W. Moorhead after his death.

The Indiana Weekly Messenger was published in the town between 1874 and 1946.

The Downtown Indiana Historic District was listed on the National Register of Historic Places in 1993. Also listed on the National Register are Breezedale, Buffalo, Rochester & Pittsburgh Railway Indiana Passenger Station, Silas M. Clark House, Graff's Market, James Mitchell House, Old Indiana County Courthouse, Indiana Borough 1912 Municipal Building, Indiana Armory, Old Indiana County Jail and Sheriff's Office, and John Sutton Hall.

On November 4, 2025, Indiana Borough elected its first African American Mayor to office, Charles M. Simelton, who took office on January 5, 2026.

== Geography ==
The borough is an independent municipality surrounded by White Township. According to the United States Census Bureau, the borough has a total area of 1.8 square miles (4.7 km^{2}), all of it land.

=== Climate ===
Indiana has a humid continental climate (Köppen Dfb), with warm summers and cold, snowy winters. Precipitation is highest in the summer months, falling as snow usually between November and April.

Climate data for Indiana, Pennsylvania (3mi SE) (1991–2020 normals, extremes 1946–present)
Month	Jan	Feb	Mar	Apr	May	Jun	Jul	Aug	Sep	Oct	Nov	Dec	Year
Record high °F (°C)	75 (24)	78 (26)	86 (30)	91 (33)	91 (33)	95 (35)	98 (37)	99 (37)	97 (36)	87 (31)	81 (27)	76 (24)	99 (37)
Mean daily maximum °F (°C)	35.8 (2.1)	39.2 (4.0)	48.8 (9.3)	61.7 (16.5)	71.5 (21.9)	78.7 (25.9)	82.5 (28.1)	81.1 (27.3)	74.8 (23.8)	63.4 (17.4)	51.0 (10.6)	40.7 (4.8)	60.8 (16.0)
Daily mean °F (°C)	26.7 (−2.9)	28.8 (−1.8)	37.1 (2.8)	48.3 (9.1)	58.7 (14.8)	66.5 (19.2)	70.7 (21.5)	69.4 (20.8)	63.0 (17.2)	51.9 (11.1)	40.5 (4.7)	32.3 (0.2)	49.5 (9.7)
Mean daily minimum °F (°C)	17.6 (−8.0)	18.4 (−7.6)	25.4 (−3.7)	34.9 (1.6)	46.0 (7.8)	54.4 (12.4)	58.8 (14.9)	57.7 (14.3)	51.2 (10.7)	40.3 (4.6)	30.0 (−1.1)	23.9 (−4.5)	38.2 (3.4)
Record low °F (°C)	−24 (−31)	−26 (−32)	−10 (−23)	10 (−12)	16 (−9)	31 (−1)	35 (2)	34 (1)	25 (−4)	11 (−12)	−4 (−20)	−19 (−28)	−26 (−32)
Average precipitation inches (mm)	3.64 (92)	2.95 (75)	3.88 (99)	4.03 (102)	4.32 (110)	4.81 (122)	5.13 (130)	4.26 (108)	4.18 (106)	3.52 (89)	3.50 (89)	3.64 (92)	47.86 (1,216)
Average snowfall inches (cm)	13.3 (34)	11.8 (30)	6.1 (15)	1.1 (2.8)	0.0 (0.0)	0.0 (0.0)	0.0 (0.0)	0.0 (0.0)	0.0 (0.0)	0.0 (0.0)	2.7 (6.9)	10.8 (27)	45.8 (116)
Average precipitation days (≥ 0.01 in)	17.2	14.3	13.5	14.7	15.2	13.6	13.6	12.1	11.9	12.7	13.3	15.1	167.2
Average snowy days (≥ 0.1 in)	10.0	7.8	4.5	1.0	0.0	0.0	0.0	0.0	0.0	0.0	2.4	6.1	31.8
Source: NOAA

== Demographics ==
Historical population
Census	Pop.	Note	%±
1820	317		—
1830	433		36.6%
1840	674		55.7%
1850	963		42.9%
1860	1,331		38.2%
1870	1,605		20.6%
1880	1,907		18.8%
1890	1,963		2.9%
1900	4,142		111.0%
1910	5,749		38.8%
1920	7,043		22.5%
1930	9,569		35.9%
1940	10,050		5.0%
1950	11,743		16.8%
1960	13,005		10.7%
1970	16,100		23.8%
1980	16,051		−0.3%
1990	15,174		−5.5%
2000	14,895		−1.8%
2010	13,975		−6.2%
2020	14,044		0.5%
2021 (est.)	13,508	▼	−3.8%

=== 2020 census ===
As of the 2020 census, Indiana had a population of 14,044. The median age was 22.7 years. 12.6% of residents were under the age of 18 and 9.7% of residents were 65 years of age or older. For every 100 females there were 83.1 males, and for every 100 females age 18 and over there were 81.7 males age 18 and over.

100.0% of residents lived in urban areas, while 0.0% lived in rural areas.

There were 4,661 households in Indiana, of which 19.2% had children under the age of 18 living in them. Of all households, 25.5% were married-couple households, 31.9% were households with a male householder and no spouse or partner present, and 35.9% were households with a female householder and no spouse or partner present. About 37.7% of all households were made up of individuals and 9.2% had someone living alone who was 65 years of age or older.

There were 5,336 housing units, of which 12.6% were vacant. The homeowner vacancy rate was 4.6% and the rental vacancy rate was 11.3%.

Racial composition as of the 2020 census
Race	Number	Percent
White	11,767	83.8%
Black or African American	1,067	7.6%
American Indian and Alaska Native	16	0.1%
Asian	335	2.4%
Native Hawaiian and Other Pacific Islander	5	0.0%
Some other race	221	1.6%
Two or more races	633	4.5%
Hispanic or Latino (of any race)	647	4.6%

=== 2010 census ===
As of the 2010 census, there were 13,975 people and 4,624 households residing in the borough.

=== 2000 census ===
The population density in 2000 was 8,440.0 people per square mile (3,267.6/km^{2}). There were 5,096 housing units at an average density of 2,887.6 per square mile (1,114.9/km^{2}). The racial makeup of the borough was 91.51% White, 5.19% African American, 0.07% Native American, 1.89% Asian, 0.02% Pacific Islander, 0.44% from other races, and 0.89% from two or more races. Hispanic or Latino of any race were 1.20% of the population.

There were 4,804 households, out of which 14.1% had children under the age of 18 living with them, 26.5% were married couples living together, 6.1% had a female householder with no husband present, and 65.3% were non-families. 34.1% of all households were made up of individuals, and 10.3% had someone living alone who was 65 years of age or older. The average household size was 2.29 and the average family size was 2.81.

The age distribution was 8.2% under the age of 18, 59.4% from 18 to 24, 13.7% from 25 to 44, 10.5% from 45 to 64, and 8.2% who were 65 years of age or older. The median age was 22 years. For every 100 females, there were 83.8 males. For every 100 females age 18 and over, there were 82.3 males.

=== Income and poverty ===
The median income for a household in the borough was $21,279, and the median income for a family was $47,768. Males had a median income of $32,333 versus $27,831 for females. The per capita income for the borough was $12,317. About 11.2% of families and 44.1% of the population were below the poverty line, including 14.3% of those under age 18 and 11.5% of those age 65 or over.

== Economy ==
Three iron foundries operated in Indiana at different times between 1851 and 1948.

McCreary Tire and Rubber opened a plant in Indiana in 1914. McCreary was renamed to Specialty Tires of America in 1992 and has its main office in Indiana.

== Arts and culture ==
Indiana County became known as the "Christmas Tree Capital of the World" in the mid-1950s, as noted in an Associated Press report. In 1956 alone, the county harvested about 700,000 trees, emphasizing its importance in Christmas tree production. In 1958, Shelton, Washington, also claimed the title, but Indiana County defended its status when local nurseryman Walter Schroth confirmed an order of 15,000 trees being shipped to Tacoma, Washington. While other states may now produce more trees, Indiana County was one of the first to gain widespread recognition. A reporter covering various "Christmas Tree Capitals" noted that Indiana County was the only one with official roadside signs declaring the title.

== Education ==
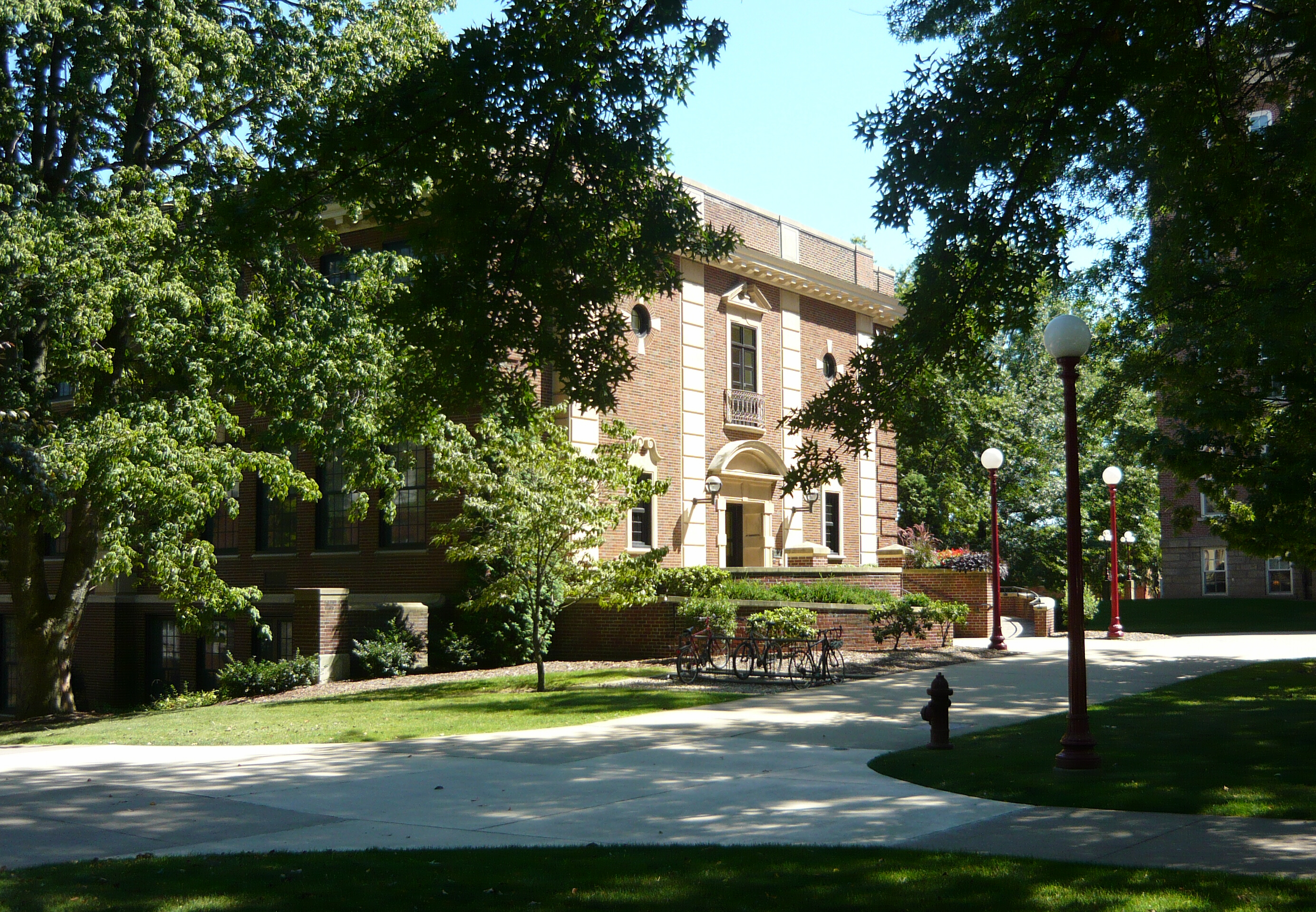
McElhaney Borough Hall on Indiana University of Pennsylvania campus

Indiana University of Pennsylvania is a public university founded in 1875, originally founded as Indiana Normal School. For public K-12 education, the Indiana Area School District, which includes the borough, supports three neighborhood elementary schools (Eisenhower, East Pike and Ben Franklin), a junior high school (Indiana Area Junior High School), and a high school (Indiana Area Senior High School), which are accredited and recognized for quality. A Catholic-affiliated Pre-K through grade 6 program is offered at the St. Bernard School, in addition to other various parochial schools for different denominations.

== Media ==
Indiana's local newspaper is the Indiana Gazette. Indiana is also home to several radio stations including WIUP, WQMU, WDAD, WFSJ, WMUG and WDAD.

== Notable people ==
- Jimmy Stewart, actor. The Jimmy Stewart Museum is located in the public library, and there is an annual Jimmy Stewart film festival as part of the town's It's a Wonderful Life holiday celebration.
- Edward Abbey, author whose fiction is set in Indiana.
- James H. Bronson, Medal of Honor recipient in American Civil War
- Renée Fleming, Lyric Soprano and National Medal of Arts recipient who has sung in world's most prestigious opera houses; Tony Award nominee for Rodgers and Hammerstein's Carousel
- Doc Gessler, Major League baseball player born Indiana, Pennsylvania
- Connie Kunkle (1958–2016), Former ShopHQ host, singer and television personality
- Chris Kuzneski, author
- Ernest W. Lewis, Arizona territorial jurist
- Paul McCandless, Grammy Award-winning jazz woodwind player and composer
- Jim Nance, football player inducted into New England Patriots Hall of Fame in 2009, was born in Indiana and graduated from Indiana High School
- James H. McCormick, academic administrator and father of U.S. Senator Dave McCormick
- Sandy McPeak, actor
- Harriet Earhart Monroe (1842–1927), lecturer, educator, writer, traveling producer of religious stage plays
- Tawni O'Dell, author
- Michael Ryan, Major League Baseball player
- Edward Scofield, 19th Governor of Wisconsin; lived in Indiana, PA
- Joe Saylor, drummer and jazz percussionist for Jon Batiste and Stay Human, the house band for the Late Show with Stephen Colbert
- Jack Sonni, guitarist and writer (Dire Straits)
- Steve Wheatcroft, professional golfer
- Mary Wiggins, composer
