= Breezedale =

Historic house in Pennsylvania, United States

- U.S. National Register of Historic Places
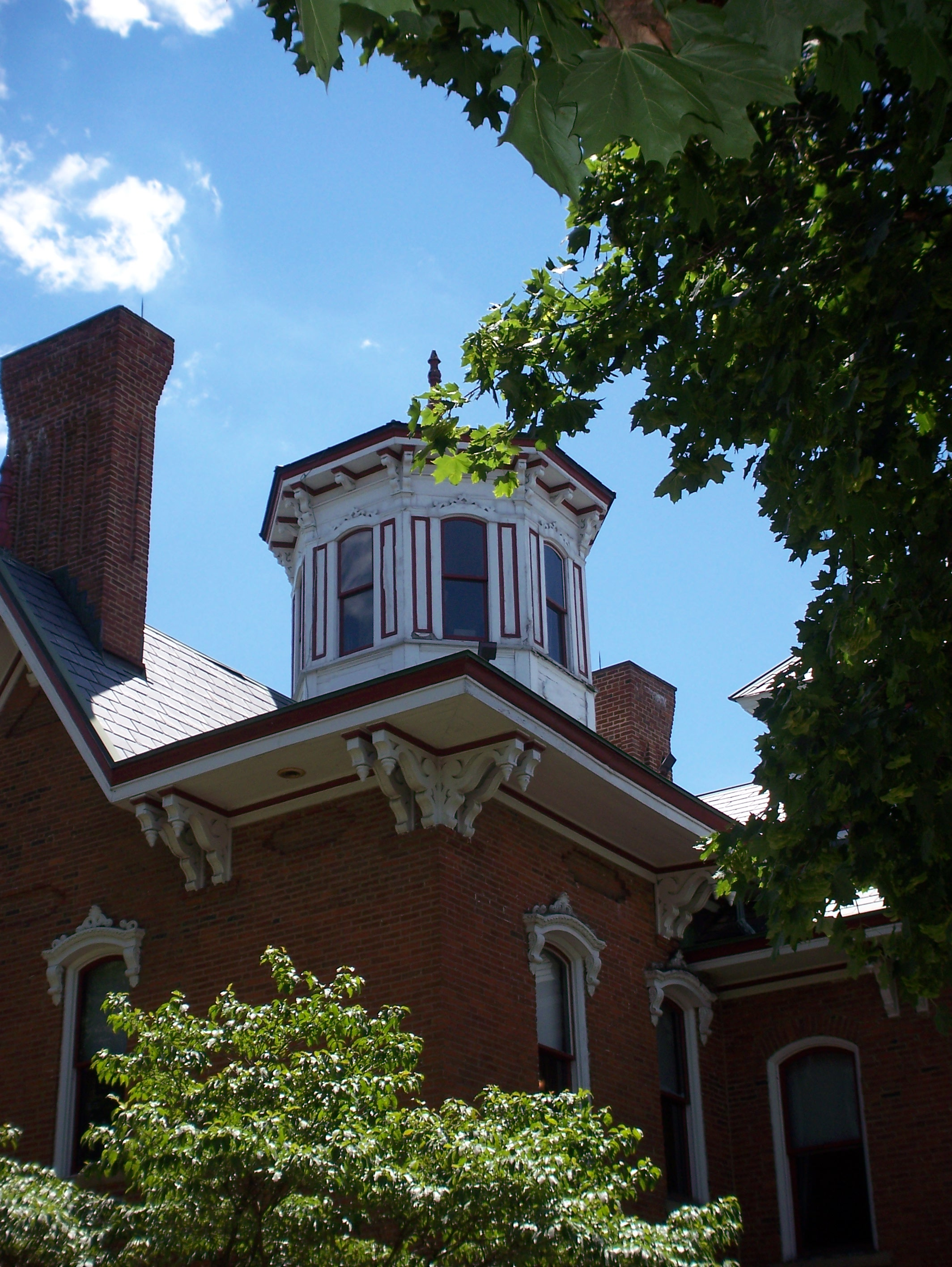
- Breezedale, July 2008

- Location within Pennsylvania Location within the United States
- Location: Indiana University of Pennsylvania campus, Indiana, Pennsylvania
- Coordinates: 40°37′11″N 79°9′23″W
- Area: 1.3 acres (0.53 ha)
- Built: 1865-1868
- Architectural style: Late Victorian, Italianate
- NRHP reference No.: 79002238
- Added to NRHP: March 29, 1979

"Breezedale", also known as Sutton-Elkin House, is an historic home located on the campus of Indiana University of Pennsylvania in Indiana, Indiana County, Pennsylvania.

It was added to the National Register of Historic Places in 1979.

== History and architectural features ==
Built between 1865 and 1868, by John Sutton, a local businessman, Breezedale has a two-and-one-half-story, twenty-by-thirty-foot, brick main building, which was designed in a Late Victorian-Italianate-style.

Attached to the main section are a twelve-by-eighteen-foot wood addition and two brick extensions. The home features a classic portico and cupola.

After the Suttons, the house was occupied by John Pratt Elkin, a lawyer and politician who ended his career as a justice on the Pennsylvania Supreme Court, hence its alternate name, the "Sutton-Elkin House".

Since becoming a part of the university sometime after 1915 the house has been used as a dormitory and for classroom space.

Added to the National Register of Historic Places in 1979, it is now home to the Breezedale Alumni Center.
