= John B. McCormick House =

Historic house in Pennsylvania, US

- U.S. National Register of Historic Places
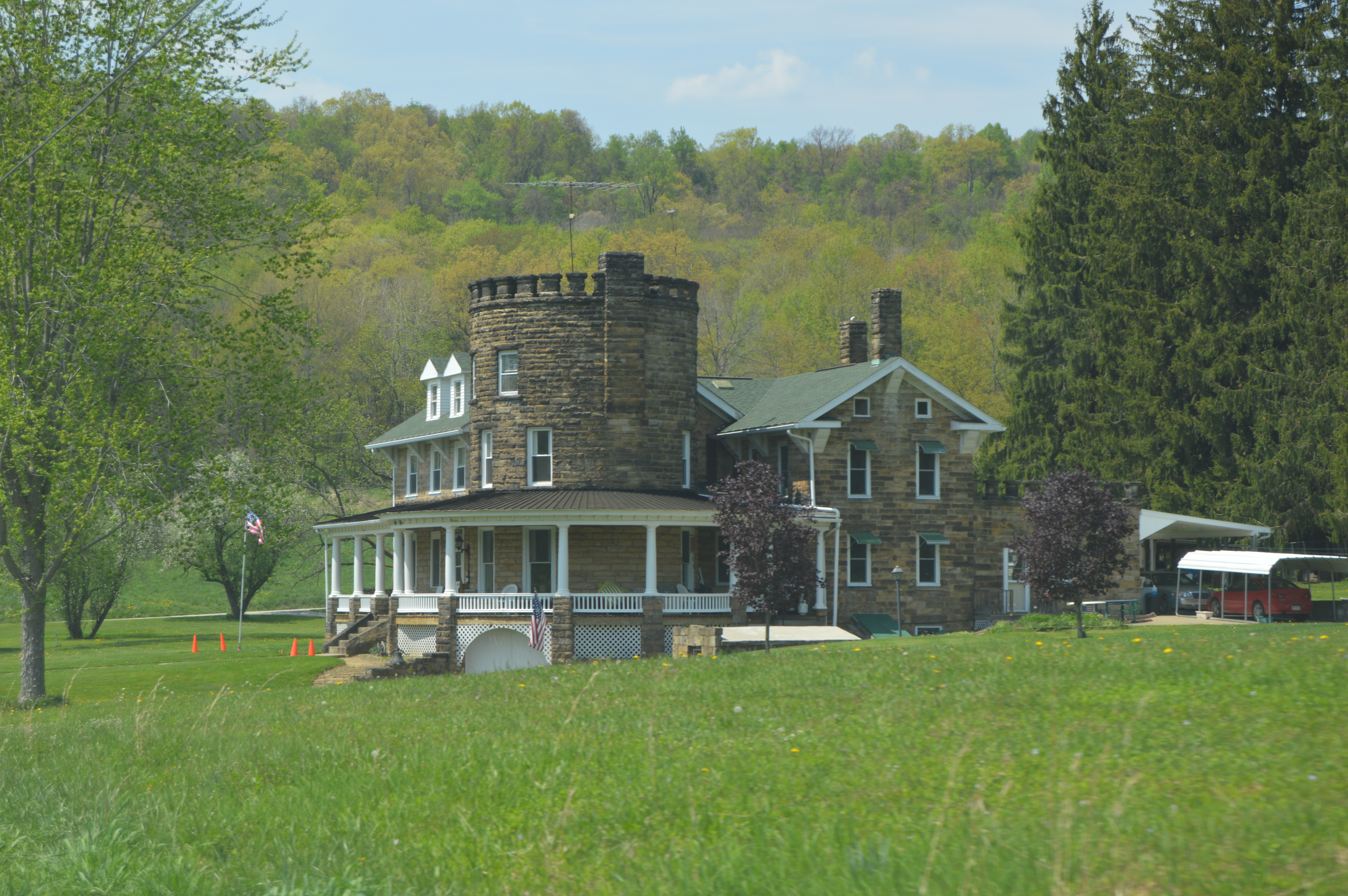
- Eastern side and front

- Location within Pennsylvania Location within the United States
- Location: South Mahoning Township, Pennsylvania
- Coordinates: 40°50′19″N 79°7′2″W
- Area: 3 acres (1.2 ha)
- Built: 1817-1829, 1902-1905
- Architect: McCormick, John Buchanan
- NRHP reference No.: 74001787
- Added to NRHP: May 3, 1974

The John B. McCormick House is an historic home that is located in South Mahoning Township, Indiana County, Pennsylvania, United States.

It was added to the National Register of Historic Places in 1974.

== History and architectural features ==
The original section was built between 1817 and 1829, and is a 2 1/2-story, three-bay, stone building with a gable roof and massive gable chimney. It was expanded between 1905 and 1905 by John B. McCormick. At that time, a large, two-story hip and gable roofed addition was built on the rear. Attached to that is a one-story, shed roofed addition with a parapet. The original house was modified with the addition of a three-story stone tower, porch with Doric order supporting columns, and dormers.

The house is named after John Buchanan McCormick (1834-1924), who had a varied career. In 1870 he moved from Pennsylvania to Holyoke, Massachusetts where he designed, using the flumes at John Wesley Emerson's plant, what would later become the Hercules water turbine. The McCormick water turbine was considered a breakthrough in hydrodynamics. Under various names, including the Hercules brand, and patents, it was manufactured in Holyoke, Dayton, Ohio, and Glasgow, Scotland and Imatra, Finland. In 1890, a McCormick turbine took first place honours at the Edinburgh Exposition.
