= St. Peter's Episcopal Church and Rectory =

Historic church in Pennsylvania, United States

- U.S. National Register of Historic Places
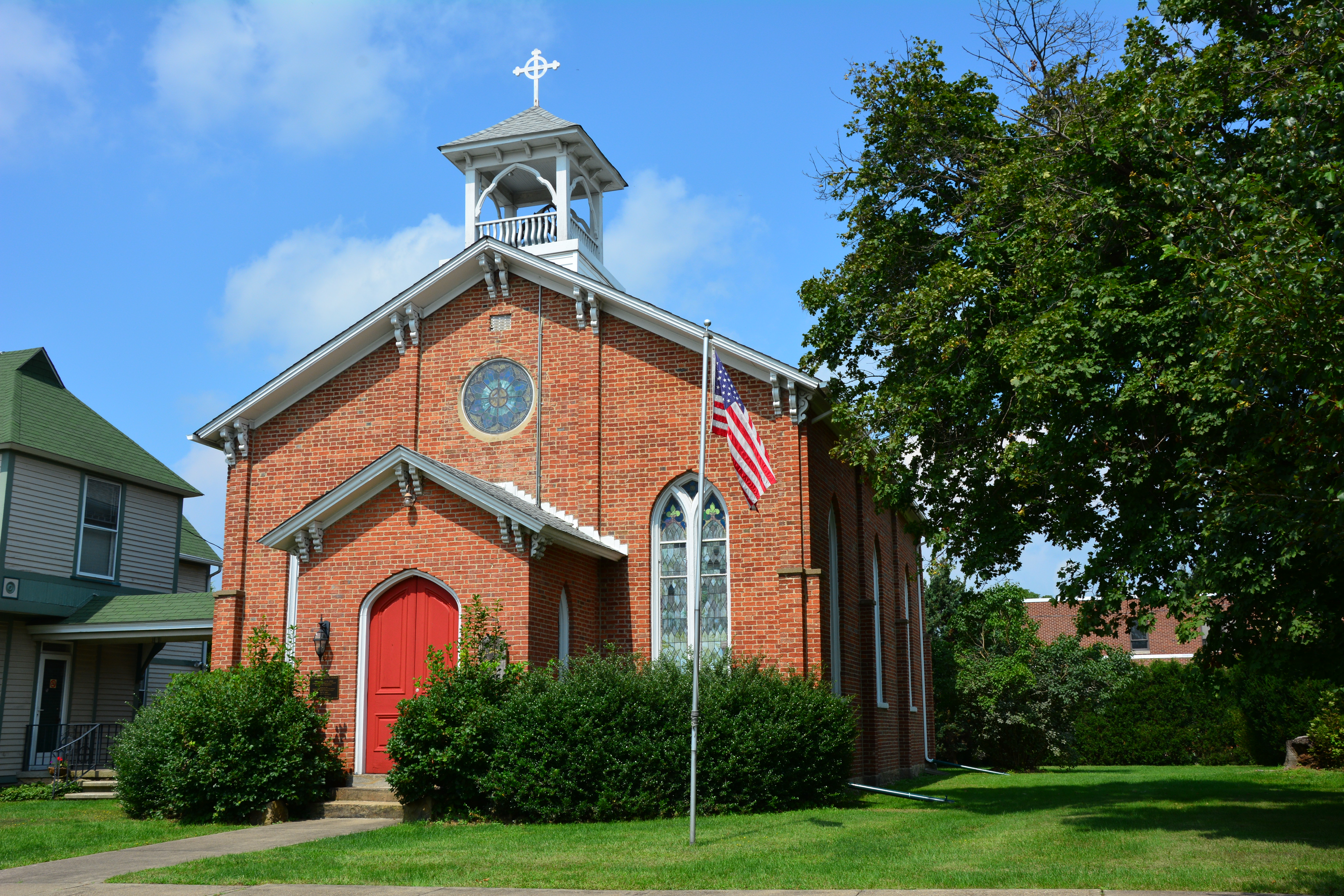
- Front of the church

- Location within Pennsylvania Location within the United States
- Location: 36–38 W. Campbell St., Blairsville, Pennsylvania
- Coordinates: 40°25′55″N 79°15′51″W
- Area: 0.4 acres (0.16 ha)
- Built: 1830, 1889
- Architect: Robert Gregory
- Architectural style: Eastlake, Gothic Revival, Early Gothic Revival
- NRHP reference No.: 88000463
- Added to NRHP: May 9, 1988

St. Peter's Episcopal Church and Rectory is a historic Episcopal church and rectory in Blairsville, Indiana County, Pennsylvania. The church was built in 1830, and is a small, rectangular brick building on a stone foundation in an Early Gothic Revival style. It features a belfry atop the front entrance gable roof. The rectory was built in 1889, and is a 2 1/2-story, wood-frame building with Eastlake movement elements.

It was added to National Register of Historic Places in 1988.
