= John B. McCormick =

American mechanical engineer (1834–1924)

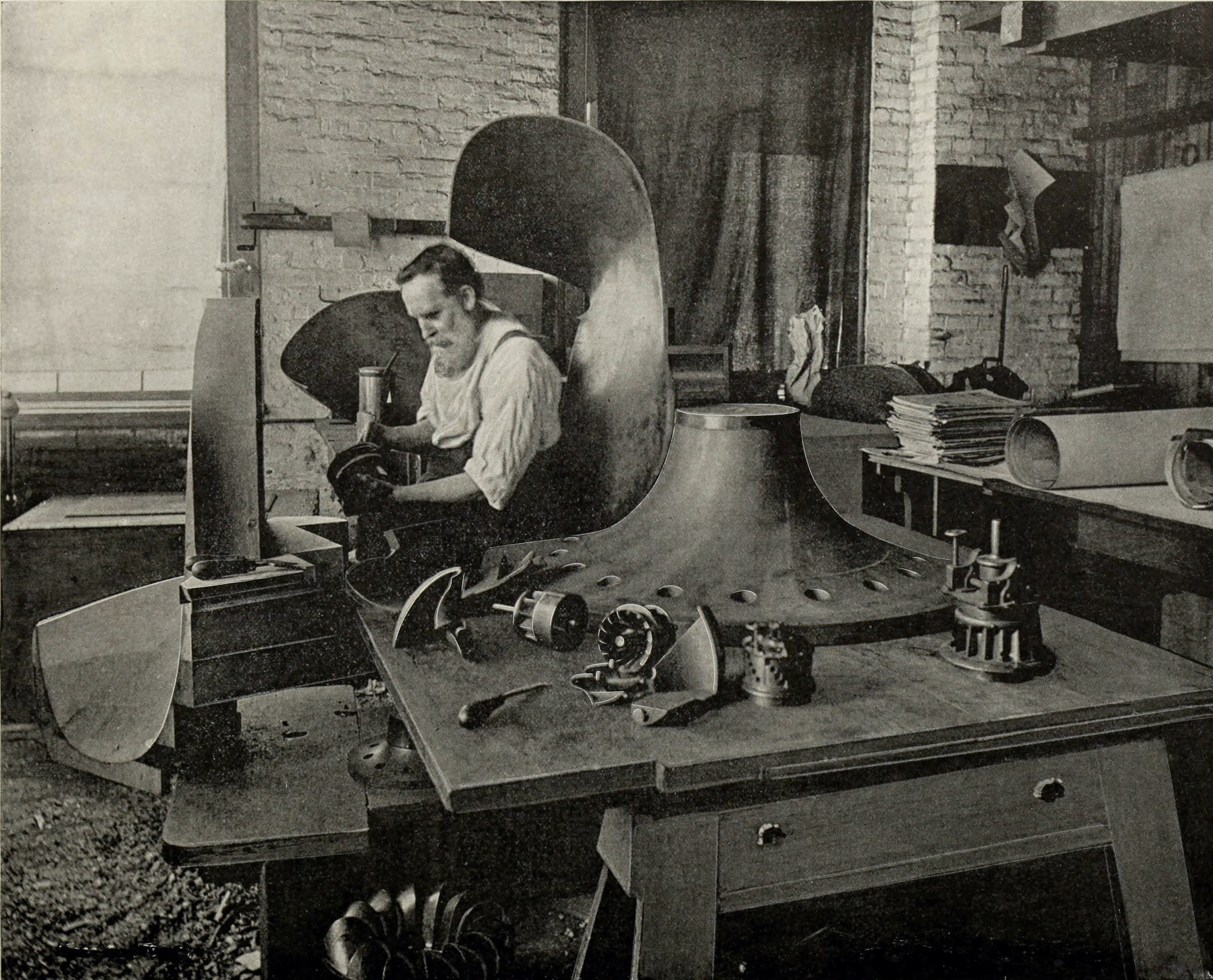
- McCormick in his workshop at J. W. Jolly, c. 1890
- Born: John Buchanan McCormick; November 4, 1834; Skelp, Pennsylvania, U.S.
- Died: August 21, 1924 (aged 89); South Mahoning Township, Pennsylvania, U.S.
- Education: Self-educated
- Occupation(s): Inventor, engineer, musician
- Years active: 1868–1924
- Children: 2

John Buchanan McCormick (November 4, 1834 – August 21, 1924) was an American mechanical engineer who invented the first modern mixed flow water turbine, the "Hercules", as well variants including the Holyoke-McCormick, and Achilles turbines. McCormick's advances building upon James B. Francis's designs led to a new era in turbine design, resulting variants of his designs being manufactured across the United States and in Europe. For several years he was engineer and mechanic for the Holyoke Machine Company before resigning, and switching over to work for machinist firm, J. W. Jolly.

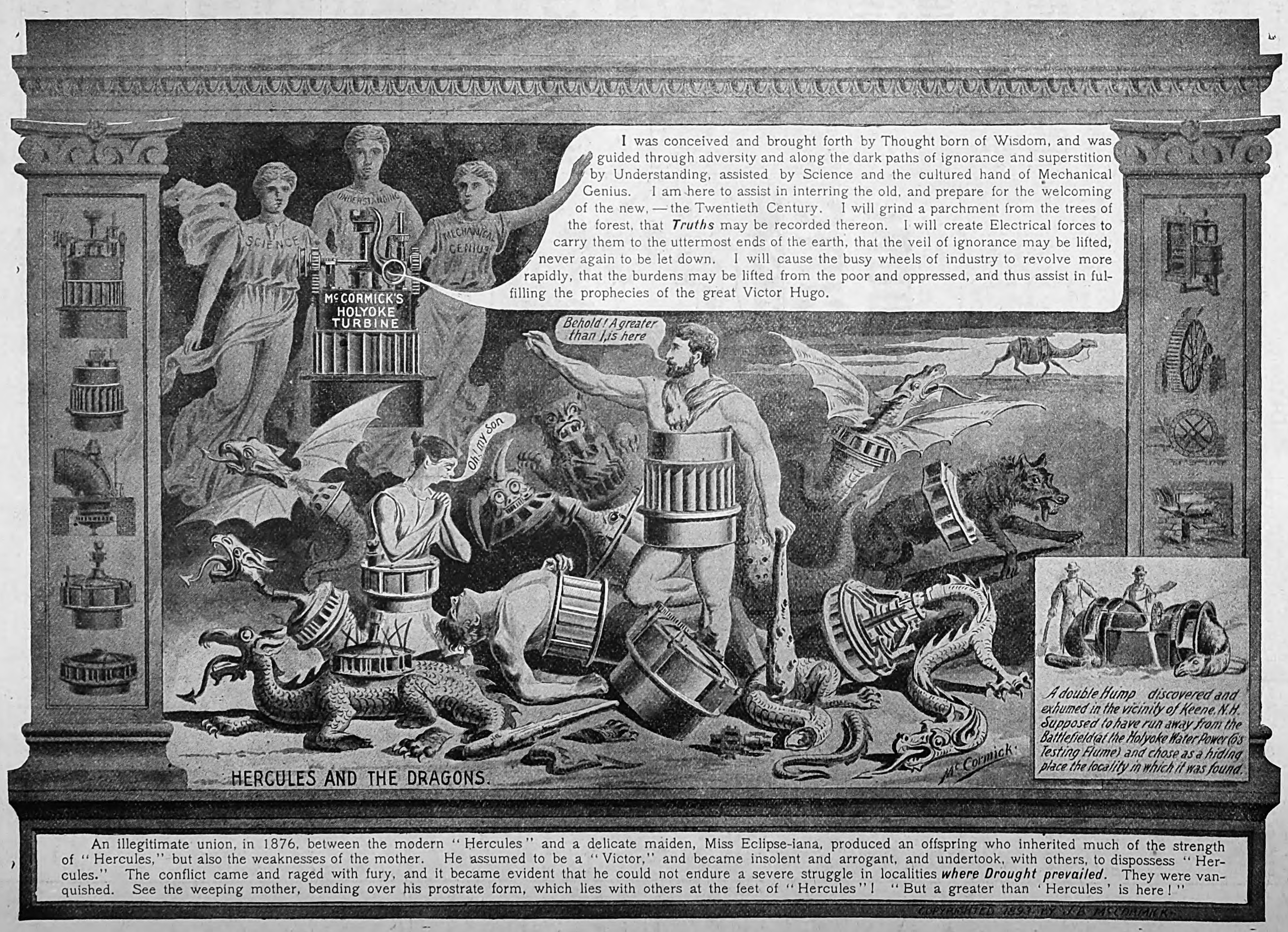

"I am here to assist in interring the old, and prepare for the welcoming of the new—the twentieth century.

I will grind a parchment from the trees of the forest, that Truths may be recorded thereon.
I will create electrical forces to carry them to the uttermost ends of the earth, that the veil of ignorance may be lifted, never again to be let down.

I will cause the busy wheels of industry to revolve more rapidly, that the burdens may be lifted from the poor and oppressed, and thus assist in fulfilling the prophecies of the great Victor Hugo."
—John B. McCormick, written as a monologue given by a personified Hercules turbine

Prior to his work on waterwheels, McCormick was a music teacher, teaching classes for numerous schools in Indiana County. While two of his brothers had served in the Union Army, one dying on the battlefield, McCormick considered himself a copperhead, and regarded the abolitionist industrialists of the North as opportunists. In 1868, he would debut at the Bush Hotel in Bellefonte a satirical ballad called "The Ku-Klux-Klan", lampooning what he perceived to be a bogeyman of the Lincoln Republicans which he believed to be no more an enduring threat than the former Know-Nothing Party. He would perform this piece, with moderate success, in 4-5 counties in western Pennsylvania.

After his engineering career in Holyoke, he purchased a large farmhouse in Pennsylvania in 1902 to live with his wife, 40 years his junior, and raise his 2 children. A modest farmhouse, he would expand it from 1902 to 1905, adding a large stone parapet. Today the John B. McCormick House is on the National Register of Historic Places.
