= Blairsville, Pennsylvania =

Borough in Pennsylvania, US

- Borough
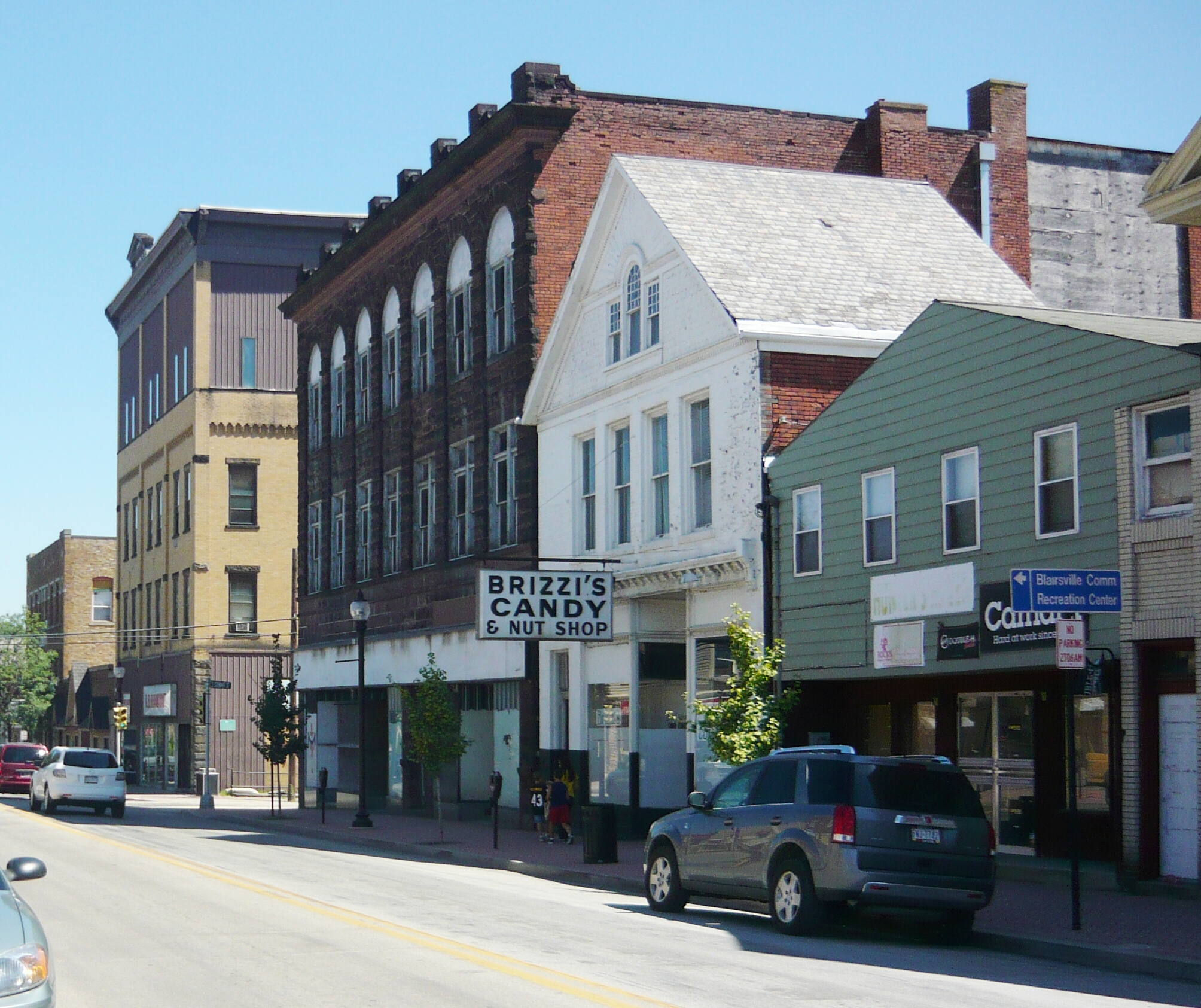
- Market Street

- Location of Blairsville in Indiana County, Pennsylvania

- Location within Pennsylvania Location within the United States
- Coordinates: 40°25′56″N 79°15′47″W
- Country: United States
- State: Pennsylvania
- County: Indiana
- Settled: 1818
- Incorporated: 1825

Government
  - Type: Borough Council

Area
  - Total: 1.41 sq mi (3.66 km^{2})
  - Land: 1.41 sq mi (3.66 km^{2})
  - Water: 0 sq mi (0.00 km^{2})
- Elevation: 1,010 ft (310 m)

Population (2020)
  - Total: 3,214
  - Density: 2,272.3/sq mi (877.33/km^{2})
- Time zone: UTC−5 (Eastern (EST))
  - Summer (DST): UTC−4 (EDT)
- ZIP Code: 15717
- Area code: 724
- FIPS code: 42-06904
- Website: blairsvilleboropa.com

Blairsville is a borough in Indiana County, Pennsylvania, United States, located 42 miles (68 km) east of Pittsburgh, and on the Conemaugh River. As of the 2020 census it had a population of 3,252.

== History ==
Blairsville was settled in 1818 and incorporated in 1825. In the past, railway shops, foundries, machine shops, enameling plants, and manufactories of plate glass and lumber employed the residents. It was the seat of Blairsville College, a Presbyterian institution opened in 1851. In 1858 the area became heavily involved in the Underground Railroad with local families. Some of these families were the Mitchells and Van Leer Family. In a letter to Theodore Parker, a local geologist Peter Lesley stated there were over 3000 men helping the railroad in the area.

The Blairsville Armory and St. Peter's Episcopal Church and Rectory are listed on the National Register of Historic Places.

In 1902, the countryside around Blairsville became one of the first in Pennsylvania to have a woman, Anna J. Devers, appointed as a Rural Free Delivery carrier, delivering mail from the Blairsville Post Office.

M. C. Eignus (1844–1941), Illinois state representative, was born in Blairsville.

== Geography ==
Blairsville is located in the southern portion of Indiana County, bordered by the Conemaugh River, Westmoreland County to the south and west, and Burrell Township to the north and east.

According to the United States Census Bureau, the borough has a total area of 1.41 square miles (3.66 km^{2}), all land.

== Demographics ==
Historical population
Census	Pop.	Note	%±
1830	957		—
1840	990		3.4%
1850	1,135		14.6%
1860	1,009		−11.1%
1870	1,054		4.5%
1880	1,162		10.2%
1890	3,126		169.0%
1900	3,386		8.3%
1910	3,572		5.5%
1920	4,391		22.9%
1930	5,296		20.6%
1940	5,002		−5.6%
1950	5,000		0.0%
1960	4,930		−1.4%
1970	4,411		−10.5%
1980	4,166		−5.6%
1990	3,595		−13.7%
2000	3,607		0.3%
2010	3,412		−5.4%
2020	3,214		−5.8%
2021 (est.)	3,238	▲	0.7%

=== 2020 census ===
As of the 2020 census, Blairsville had a population of 3,214. The median age was 46.9 years. 18.0% of residents were under the age of 18 and 23.3% of residents were 65 years of age or older. For every 100 females there were 91.9 males, and for every 100 females age 18 and over there were 89.2 males age 18 and over.

100.0% of residents lived in urban areas, while 0.0% lived in rural areas.

There were 1,511 households in Blairsville, of which 22.8% had children under the age of 18 living in them. Of all households, 40.6% were married-couple households, 20.4% were households with a male householder and no spouse or partner present, and 32.3% were households with a female householder and no spouse or partner present. About 36.1% of all households were made up of individuals and 17.2% had someone living alone who was 65 years of age or older.

There were 1,773 housing units, of which 14.8% were vacant. The homeowner vacancy rate was 2.9% and the rental vacancy rate was 15.5%.

Racial composition as of the 2020 census
Race	Number	Percent
White	2,970	92.4%
Black or African American	86	2.7%
American Indian and Alaska Native	4	0.1%
Asian	17	0.5%
Native Hawaiian and Other Pacific Islander	0	0.0%
Some other race	18	0.6%
Two or more races	119	3.7%
Hispanic or Latino (of any race)	45	1.4%

=== 2000 census ===
At the 2000 census there were 3,607 people, 1,631 households, and 983 families residing in the borough. The population density was 2,591.3 inhabitants per square mile (1,000.5/km^{2}). There were 1,830 housing units at an average density of 1,314.7 per square mile (507.6/km^{2}). The racial makeup of the borough was 95.68% White, 2.99% African American, 0.11% Native American, 0.58% Asian, 0.06% from other races, and 0.58% from two or more races. Hispanic or Latino of any race were 0.06%.

There were 1,631 households, 25.4% had children under the age of 18 living with them, 46.8% were married couples living together, 10.1% had a female householder with no husband present, and 39.7% were non-families. 36.3% of households were made up of individuals, and 19.1% were one person aged 65 or older. The average household size was 2.21 and the average family size was 2.90.

In the borough the population was spread out, with 22.4% under the age of 18, 6.5% from 18 to 24, 27.3% from 25 to 44, 22.7% from 45 to 64, and 21.2% 65 or older. The median age was 41 years. For every 100 females there were 88.8 males. For every 100 females age 18 and over, there were 85.2 males.

The median household income was $30,625 and the median family income was $38,585. Males had a median income of $32,563 versus $22,049 for females. The per capita income for the borough was $16,771. About 6.8% of families and 11.2% of the population were below the poverty line, including 15.7% of those under age 18 and 9.9% of those age 65 or over.

== Education ==
Blairsville is served by the River Valley School District, formerly the Blairsville-Saltsburg School District. The River Valley middle and high schools and Blairsville elementary school are located at the intersection of Routes 22 and 119 in nearby Burrell Township.

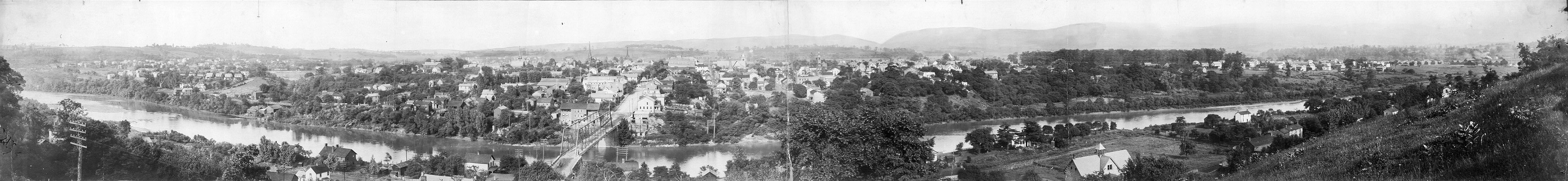
Panorama of Blairsville c. 1908
