= Kintersburg Covered Bridge =

Bridge in Pennsylvania, US

- U.S. National Register of Historic Places
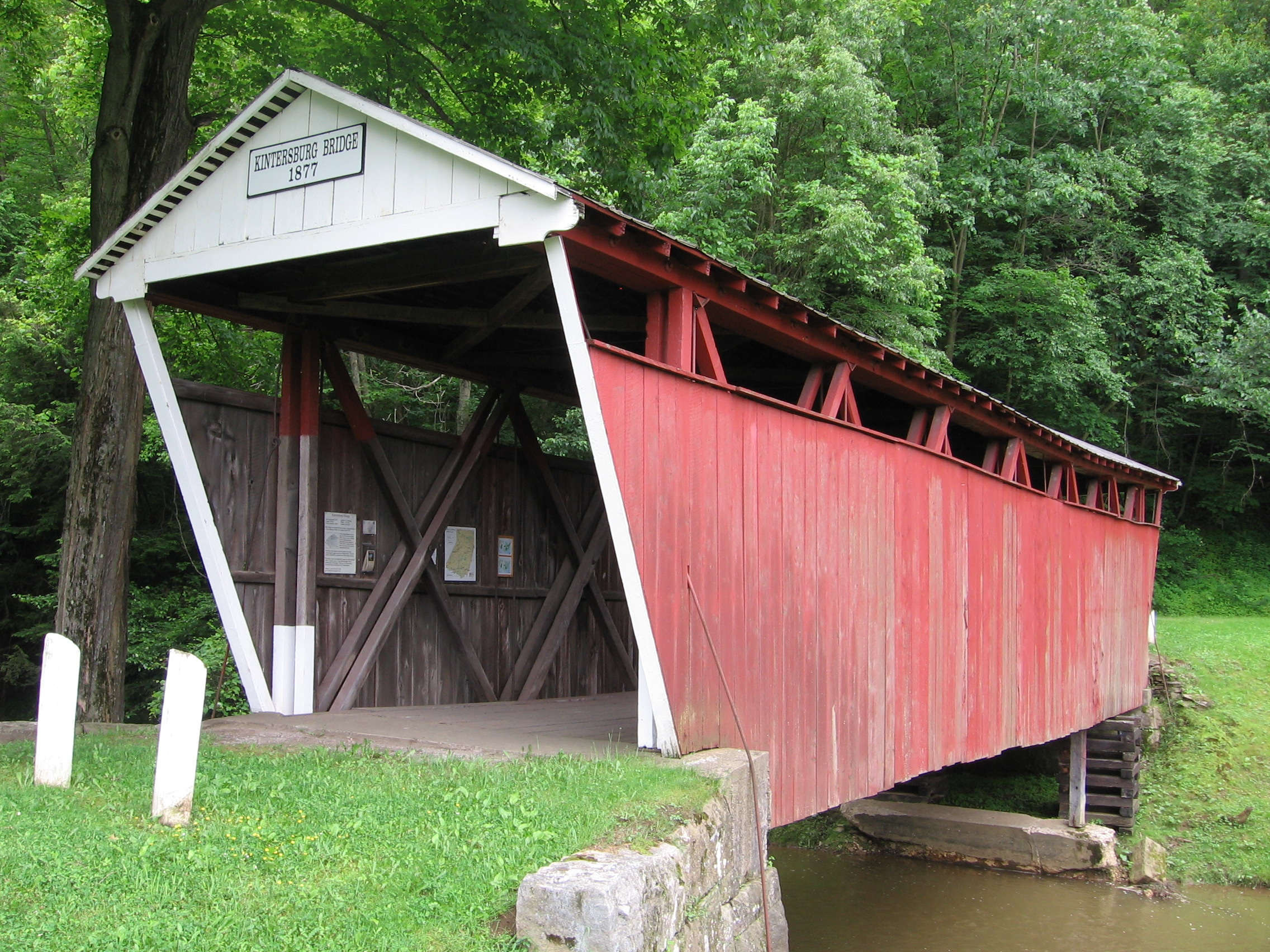
- The Kintersburg Covered Bridge over Crooked Creek

- Location within Pennsylvania Location within the United States
- Location: Kintersburg, Pennsylvania, United States
- Coordinates: 40°42′48″N 79°4′53″W
- Built: 1877
- Architect: J.S. Fleming
- NRHP reference No.: 79002241
- Added to NRHP: August 3, 1979

The Kintersburg Covered Bridge is a covered bridge spanning Crooked Creek in Rayne Township, Indiana County, Pennsylvania, United States.

It was placed on the National Register of Historic Places in 1979.

== History and architectural features ==
Built in 1877, this 62-foot-long (19 m) historic structure is one of only four covered bridges in Indiana County, and is the only one with a Howe truss design, a style that was rarely used for covered bridges.

The Kintersburg Bridge, in fact, is one of only five covered bridges in the Commonwealth of Pennsylvania with that design; the other four are the McConnell's Mill Covered Bridge in Lawrence County, Mean's Ford Covered Bridge in Bucks County, St. Mary's Covered Bridge in Huntingdon County, and the Thomas Mill Covered Bridge in Philadelphia County.

== Sources ==
- Evans, Benjamin D., and June R. Evans Pennsylvania's Covered Bridges, University of Pittsburgh Press, 2001, ISBN 0-8229-5764-7.
