= Graff's Market =

- U.S. National Register of Historic Places
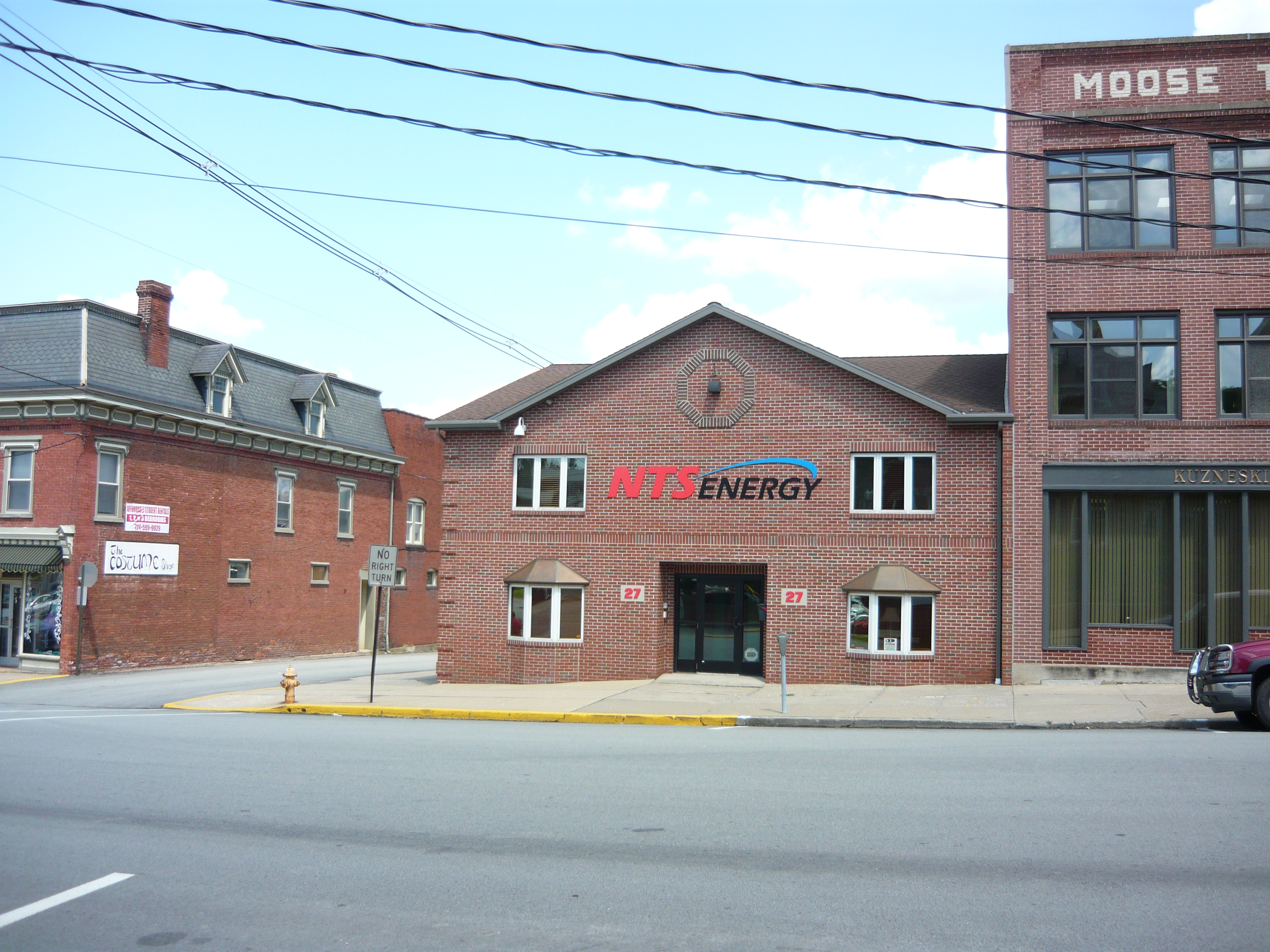
- Modern building on site of demolished historic structure

- Location within Pennsylvania Location within the United States
- Location: 27 N. 6th St., Indiana, Pennsylvania
- Coordinates: 40°37′25″N 79°9′2″W
- Area: 0.1 acres (0.040 ha)
- Built: 1887–1892
- Architect: G.W. Hesker
- Architectural style: Italianate, Cast-iron facade
- NRHP reference No.: 80003504
- Added to NRHP: December 4, 1980

Graff's Market was an historic, commercial building that was located in the community of Indiana in Indiana County, Pennsylvania.

It was added to the National Register of Historic Places in 1980.

== History and architectural features ==
Built between 1887 and 1892, Graff's Market was a three-story, wood building that was erected on a stone foundation in Indiana, Pennsylvania. Designed with a cast-iron storefront in a High Victorian Italianate-style, the building measured thirty feet by fifty-seven feet, six inches, and had a flat roof. The building housed the Graff family business for more than ninety years.

The structure has since been demolished; a modern two-story brick office building was erected in its place.
