= Old Indiana County Courthouse =

- U.S. National Register of Historic Places
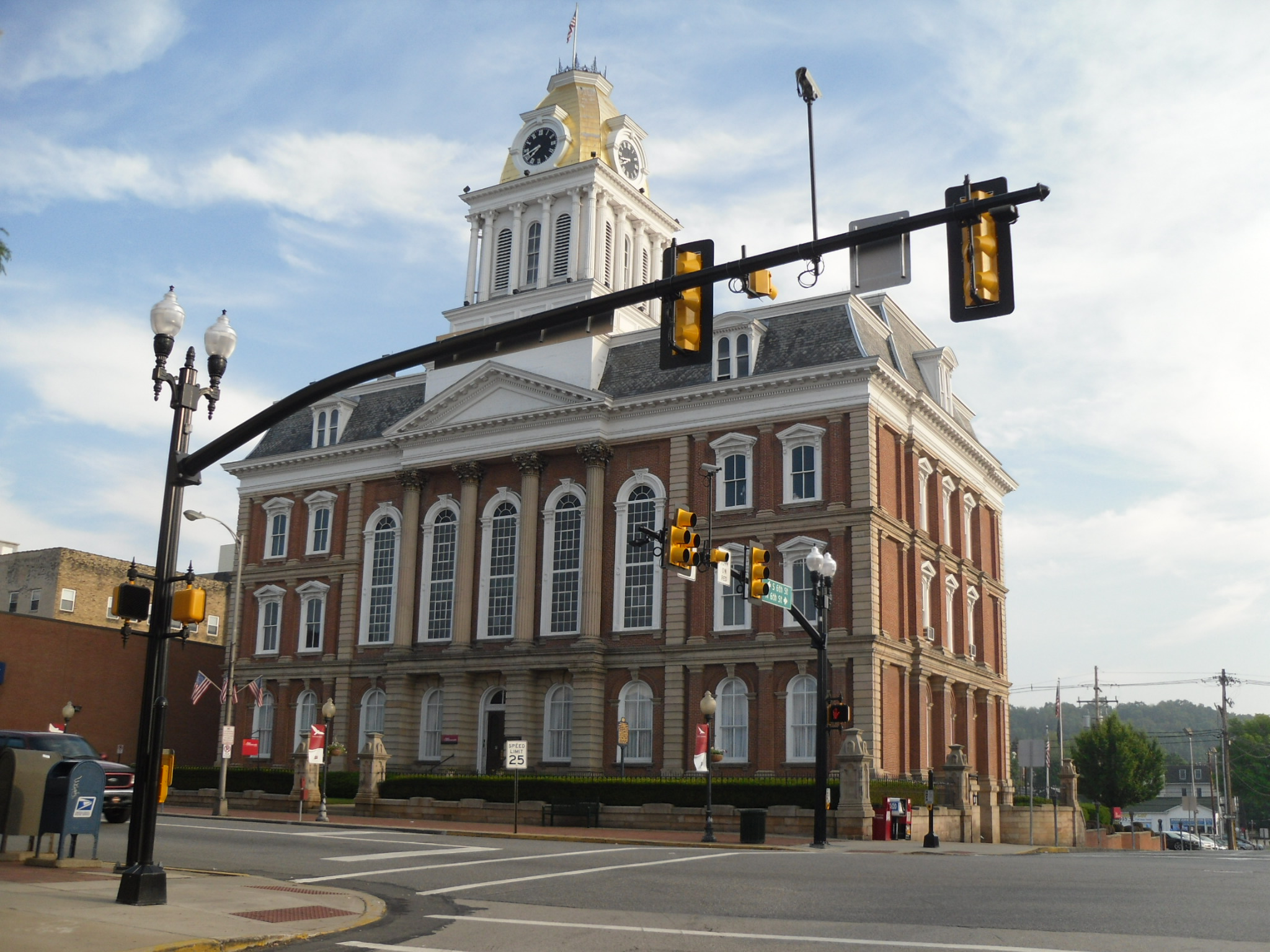

- Location within Pennsylvania Location within the United States
- Interactive map showing the location of Old Indiana County Courthouse
- Location: 601 Philadelphia Street, Indiana, Pennsylvania
- Coordinates: 40°37′23″N 79°9′7″W
- Area: 1 acre (0.40 ha)
- Built: 1869
- Architect: James W. Drum
- Architectural style: Second Empire, Modern Renaissance
- NRHP reference No.: 74001788
- Added to NRHP: October 29, 1974

The Old Indiana County Courthouse is a former courthouse located in Indiana, Indiana County, Pennsylvania. The courthouse was built between 1869 and 1870 and designed by local architect James W. Drum. It was the second courthouse to serve the county, with the first demolished in 1868. The final cost of the project was $150,000. A dedication ceremony took place on December 19, 1870. Former Governor of Pennsylvania William F. Johnston spoke at the ceremony.

The architecture, done in the Second Empire Italianate style, is primarily red brick and stone. The roof was designed in the Mansard style. The courthouse features a gold leaf cupola clocktower with four faces. The main courtroom, located on the second floor measured 100 feet (30 m) by 82 feet (25 m), with a 30 feet (9.1 m) ceiling.

The large clock in the cupola was the largest in the county at the time. It was manufactured by Howard Clock Company of Boston and Springfield, Ohio. The four faces were each 7 feet (2.1 m) in diameter. The clock required winding once a week, a 15-minute process. Today the clock runs on a new digital style, that turns the hands on the faces of the clock.

A jail and sheriff's residence was constructed next door in 1879, with a bridge that connected it to the courthouse to transport prisoners. At least six individuals were hanged in the court's jailyard, between 1882 and 1913.

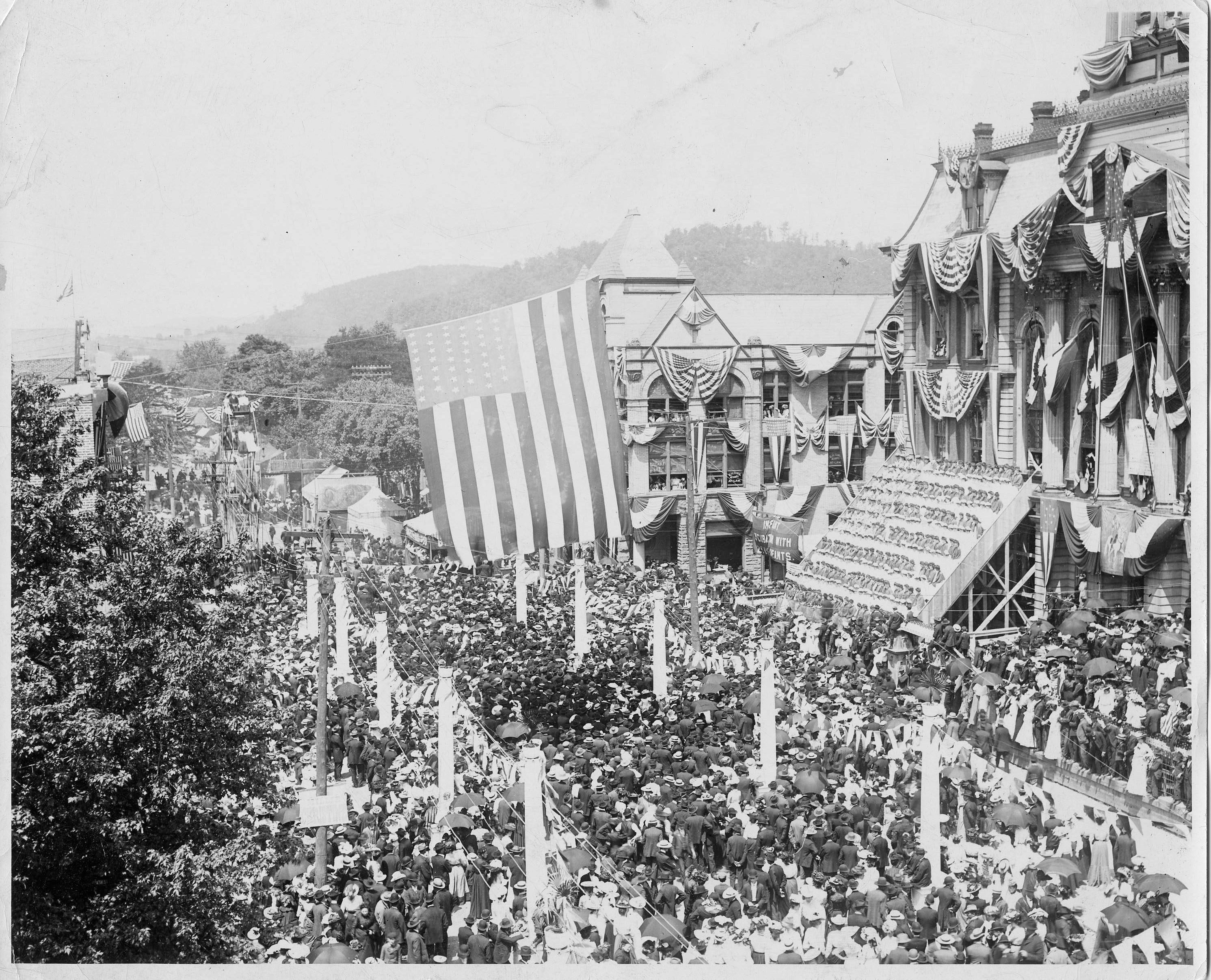
1903 county centennial celebration at the courthouse

On September 24, 1945, a picture of Indiana-native Jimmy Stewart in front of the courthouse was featured on the cover of Life magazine. John F. Kennedy gave a speech outside the courthouse on October 15, 1960 while campaigning during the presidential election. In the rafters above the court room, there is a painted "JFK". As to whether this was from JFK himself is unknown.

The courthouse held its final session on November 11, 1970. After its replacement, the old courthouse fell into disuse and faced demolition. The county commissioners offered a restoration-lease agreement to interested parties. On January 3, 1972, the commissioners approved an agreement with the National Bank of the Commonwealth, who planned to renovate the building for administrative use. The bank was required to invest $100,000 in restoration over the initial three-year lease to qualify for a 47-year extension. The bank agreed to pay $12,000 total in taxes and rent for use of the courthouse, including the jail next door when it was vacated.

Today, the entire bell tower is supported by scaffolding set up in the main court room of the building, due to the age of the building's supports. This area is not seen by visitors very often.

The courthouse was listed on the National Register of Historic Places on October 29, 1974. Currently the building serves as administrative offices for First Commonwealth Financial.

The courthouse is featured in the Miniature Railroad & Village at the Kamin Science Center in Pittsburgh.

== See also ==
- National Register of Historic Places listings in Indiana County, Pennsylvania
- List of state and county courthouses in Pennsylvania
