= Indiana Armory =

- U.S. National Register of Historic Places
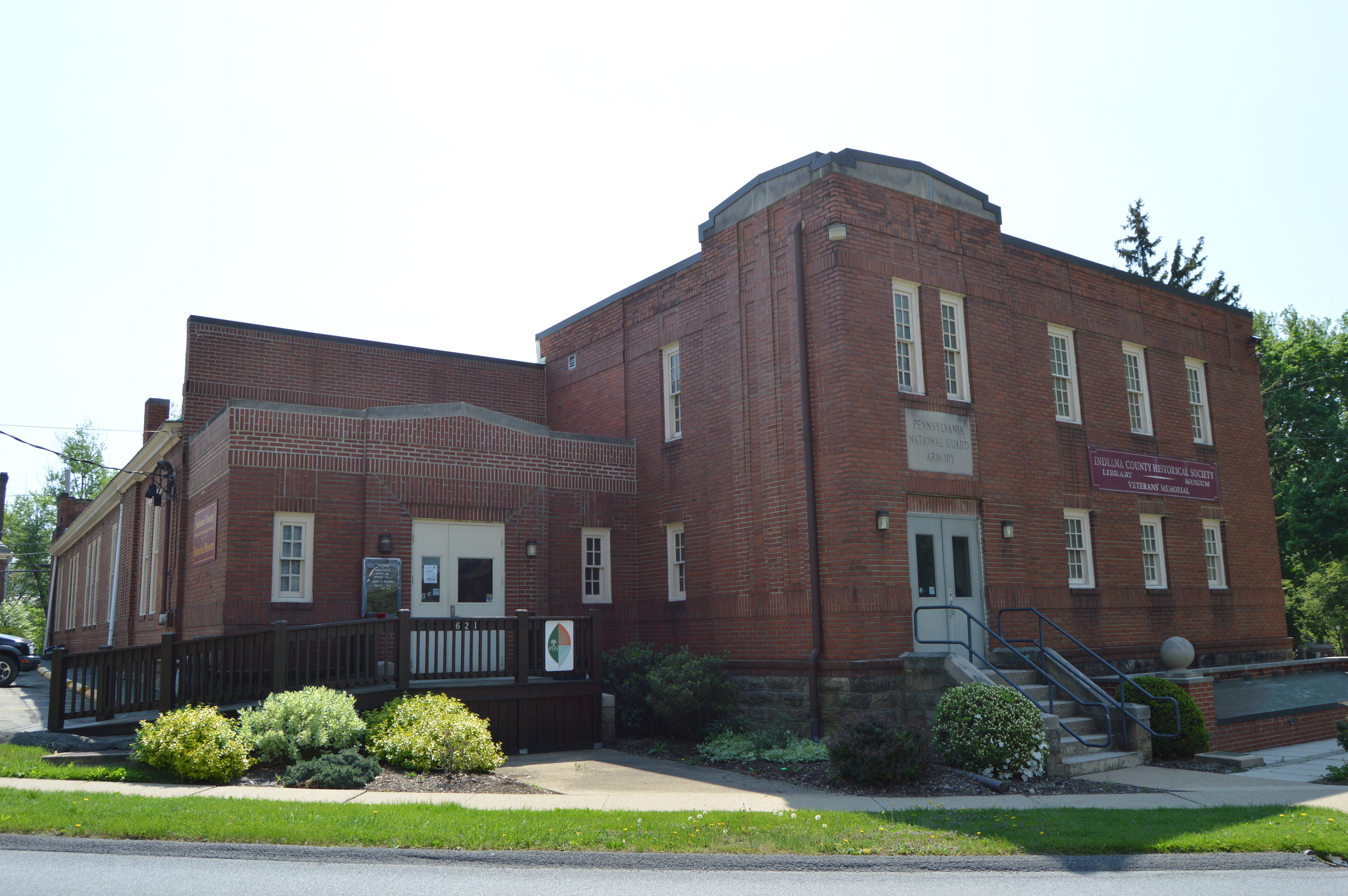
- Front and northern side

- Location within Pennsylvania Location within the United States
- Location: 621 Wayne Ave., Indiana, Pennsylvania
- Coordinates: 40°37′11″N 79°9′5″W
- Area: 0.3 acres (0.12 ha)
- Built: 1922, 1929
- Architect: W.G. Wilkins Co.; Kuntz, Joseph F.
- Architectural style: Moderne
- MPS: Pennsylvania National Guard Armories MPS
- NRHP reference No.: 91001698
- Added to NRHP: November 14, 1991

The Indiana Armory is an historic National Guard armory which is located in Indiana, Indiana County, Pennsylvania.

It was added to the National Register of Historic Places in 1991.

== History and architectural features ==
Designed by Joseph F. Kuntz of Pittsburgh architects W.G. Wilkins Co., the drill hall was built in 1922, and is a one-story structure with a gambrel roof. The administration building was added in 1929, and consists of a two-story section with a recessed one-story portion. The building is a modified "T"-plan in the Moderne style.
