= Indiana Borough 1912 Municipal Building =

- U.S. National Register of Historic Places
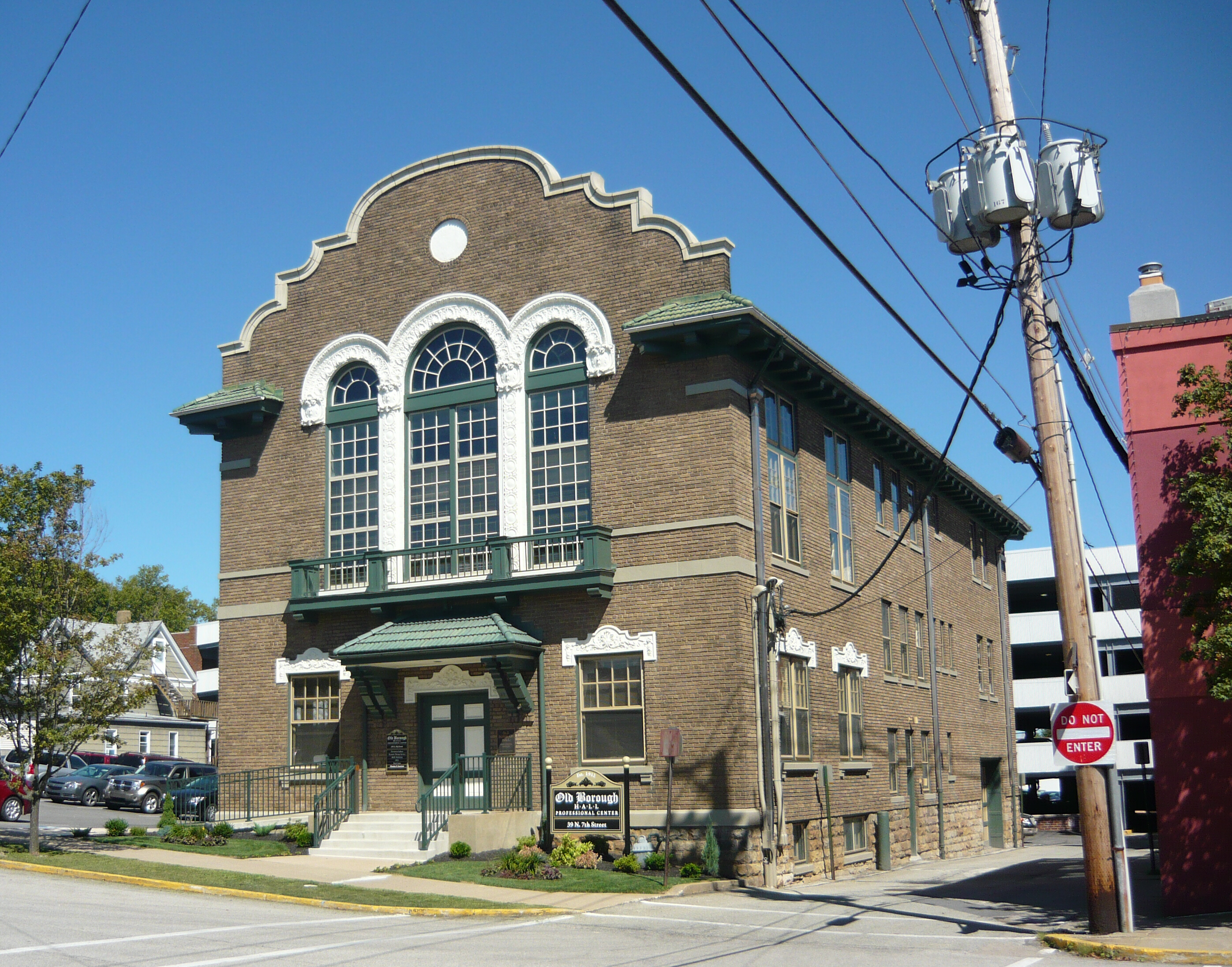
- Indiana Borough 1912 Municipal Building, August 2008

- Location within Pennsylvania Location within the United States
- Location: 39 7th St., Indiana, Pennsylvania
- Coordinates: 40°37′14″N 79°9′11″W
- Area: 0.1 acres (0.040 ha)
- Built: 1912
- Architect: Herbert King Conklin, Fred Herlinger
- Architectural style: Dutch Colonial Revival
- NRHP reference No.: 83002247
- Added to NRHP: September 7, 1983

The Indiana Borough 1912 Municipal Building is an historic municipal building which is located in Indiana, Indiana County, Pennsylvania.

It was added to the National Register of Historic Places in 1983.

== History and architectural features ==
Built in 1912, this historic structure is a 2 1/2-story, three-bay by five-bay brick building, which was designed in the Dutch Colonial Revival-style. The front facade features a uniquely shaped, stepped and arched parapet and elongated arcaded windows. It is reminiscent of seventeenth-century Dutch Town Halls.
