= Silas M. Clark House =

Historic house in Pennsylvania, United States

- U.S. National Register of Historic Places
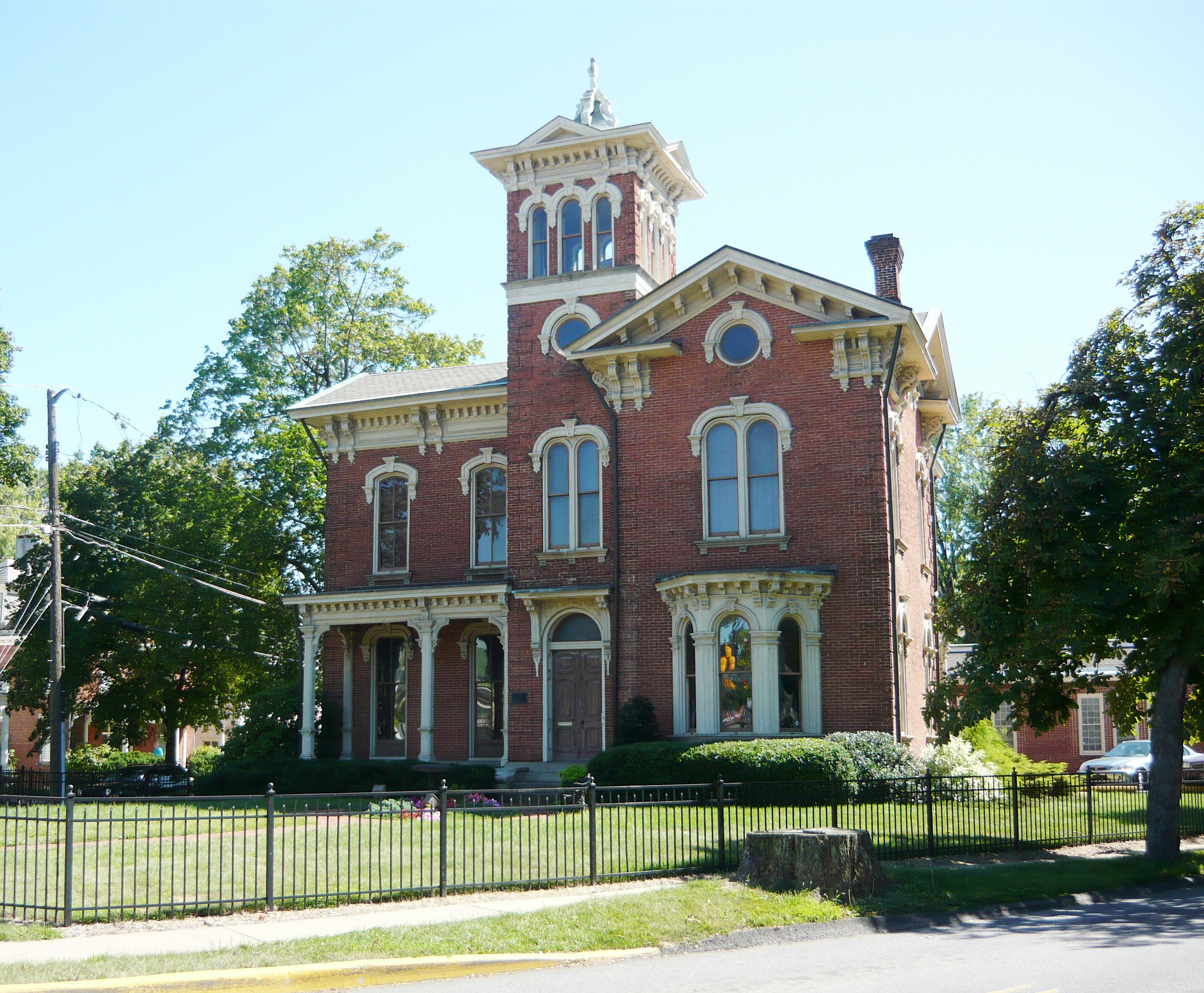
- Silas M. Clark House, August 2008

- Location within Pennsylvania Location within the United States
- Location: 6th St. and Wayne Ave., Indiana, Pennsylvania
- Coordinates: 40°37′12″N 79°9′5″W
- Area: 0.2 acres (0.081 ha)
- Built: 1869-1870
- Architectural style: Italian Villa
- NRHP reference No.: 78002406
- Added to NRHP: June 15, 1978

The Silas M. Clark House, also known as Clark Memorial Hall and the History House, is an historic home that is located in Indiana, Pennsylvania, United States.

It was added to the National Register of Historic Places in 1978.

== History and architecturl features ==
Built from 1869 to 1870, this historic structure is a three-story, brick building with a cross-gable roof that was designed in the Italian Villa style. It features round-headed windows, a central tower and an arched entryway, and housed the local chapter of the American Red Cross from 1918 to 1930. Since 1951, it has housed the Indiana County Historical and Genealogical Society.
