= James Mitchell House =

Historic house in Pennsylvania, United States

- U.S. National Register of Historic Places
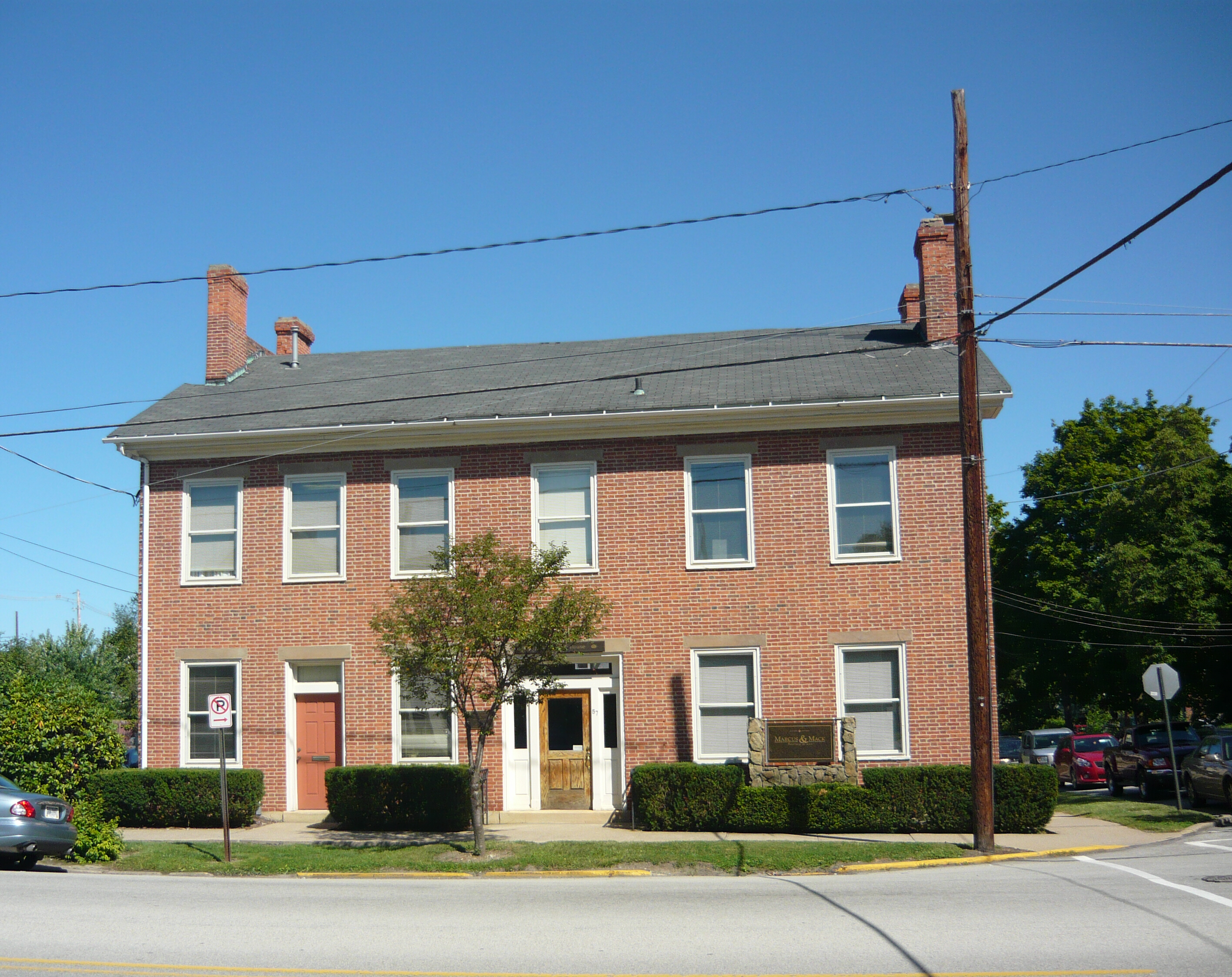
- James Mitchell House, August 2010

- Location within Pennsylvania Location within the United States
- Location: 57 S. 6th St., Indiana, Pennsylvania
- Coordinates: 40°37′18″N 79°9′2″W
- Area: 0.3 acres (0.12 ha)
- Architectural style: Federal, Vernacular Federal
- NRHP reference No.: 78002407
- Added to NRHP: December 4, 1978

The James Mitchell House is a historic home located at Indiana, Indiana County, Pennsylvania. The front section was built about 1850, and is a 2 1/2-story brick building with a gable roof in a vernacular Federal-style. It measures six bays by four bays. It has a 2 1/2-story frame rear wing, making for an L-shaped building. The house was used as an inn.

It was added to the National Register of Historic Places in 1978.

Attorney Bob Marcus purchased and restored the building in 1983. It now houses one of his law offices.
