= Glen Campbell, Pennsylvania =

Borough in Pennsylvania, US

- Borough
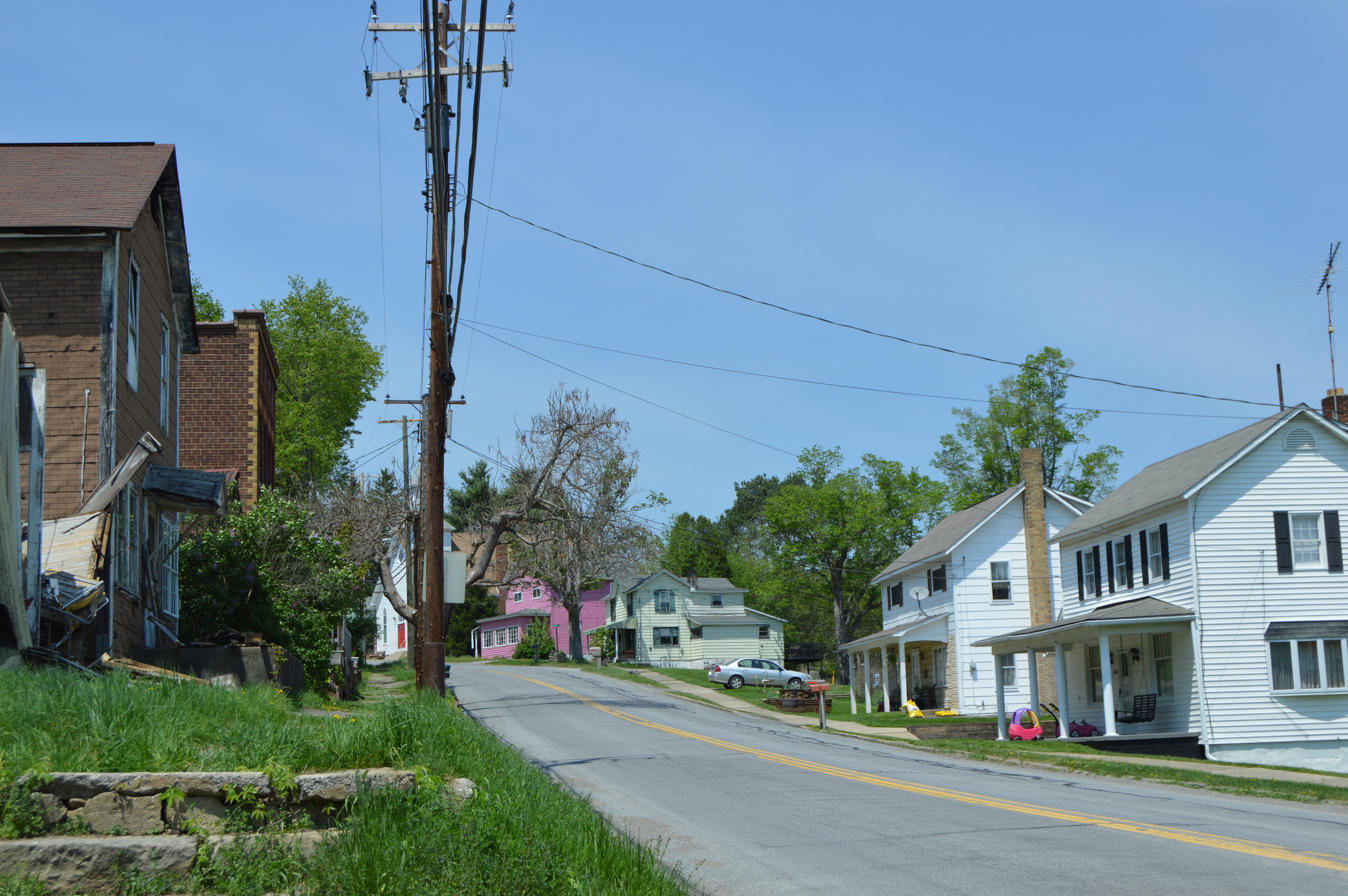
- Glenwood Avenue

- Location of Glen Campbell in Indiana County, Pennsylvania.

- Location within Pennsylvania Location within the United States
- Coordinates: 40°49′09″N 78°49′35″W
- Country: United States
- State: Pennsylvania
- County: Indiana

Government
  - Type: Borough Council

Area
  - Total: 0.93 sq mi (2.41 km^{2})
  - Land: 0.93 sq mi (2.41 km^{2})
  - Water: 0 sq mi (0.00 km^{2})

Population (2020)
  - Total: 256
  - Density: 275.1/sq mi (106.21/km^{2})
- Time zone: UTC-5 (Eastern (EST))
  - Summer (DST): UTC-4 (EDT)
- Zip code: 15742
- Area code: 814
- FIPS code: 42-29512

Glen Campbell is a borough in Indiana County, Pennsylvania, United States. The borough is located about 80 miles (135 km) east of Pittsburgh. Glen Campbell only shares borders with two other municipalities; the townships of Banks to the north, east and west, and Montgomery to the south.

The population was 254 at the 2020 census.

== History ==
The borough was named in 1889 for Cornelius Campbell, the first superintendent of the Glenwood Coal Company (glen is the Scottish word for valley), which mined in that area. Glen Campbell became a borough on September 27, 1894. ″The petition for Glen Campbell to become a borough is dated March 5, 1894. The papers were presented to the grand jury and after hearing the parties, and a full investigation of the matter, it was found that the law, under Act of Assembly, had been complied with and the prayer of the petitioners was granted. It was authorized that the election be held annually, the third Tuesday of February, as provided by the constitution. The court decreed further that the first election be held October 13, 1894, at the wareroom of B. B. Kime, in the said borough, between the hours of eight o'clock A. M. and seven o'clock P. M., and designated S. J. Smith to give due notice of said election. The court appointed Andrew Patrick judge and William Lewis and D. I. Stadden inspectors.″

Popular singer Glen Campbell visited Glen Campbell in 1971. The distinguished academic Glenn Campbell did also at some point.

Michael William Menosky, a professional baseball player, also known as "Leaping Mike" for his speed and circus-like catches in the outfield, was born in Glen Campbell on October 16, 1894. At some point, the family moved about four miles away to Arcadia. Leaping Mike went on to play baseball from 1914 to 1930. He played for the Pittsburgh Rebels, Washington Senators, and the Boston Red Sox. He replaced Babe Ruth in left field after Babe Ruth was sold to the New York Yankees, beginning what was referred to as "the curse" in Boston.

Glen Campbell, the first coal town in Indiana County, was founded in 1889. It was named for Cornelius Campbell, the first superintendent of the Glenwood Coal Company, the enterprise which initiated mining operations in the area. The town experienced immediate growth and soon a number of coal companies were operating in and around the community. The Hillsdale Coal & Coke Company was formed in 1902 by H. E. Clark, J. D. Ake, S. H. Hicks and J. O. Clark. In 1905, The Clark Brothers Coal Mining Company was established by H. E. Clark, J. O. Clark and S. L. Clark.

In 1894, just five years after its inception, Glen Campbell was incorporated as a borough. The town quickly became the service, business, and shopping center for a number of smaller mining communities that sprang up in northern Indiana County.

By 1900 Glen Campbell was the third largest town in Indiana County. It also had the distinction of being the county's fastest-growing community. In fact, residents of the community felt it was plausible that the county seat would someday be moved to Glen Campbell.

The town was serviced by both the Pennsylvania and New York Central railroads. In addition to coal mining, there were a number of lumber mills. In 1905 the Giant Electric Light, Heat, and Power Company opened operations in Glen Campbell. The company provided electricity to communities in northern Indiana and southern Clearfield counties.

Other industries included a brickyard which was established on the Cush Creek, a stream that flows through the community, and a cooper's shop which manufactured barrels. Later a battery factory was opened. There also were plans for the construction of a foundry and a furniture factory.

At its height of prosperity, the town had approximately sixty businesses. There was an opera house and a nickelodeon. The community boasted its own school system, which included a high school. There were a number of dentists and doctors. One doctor even operated an infirmary for the miners.

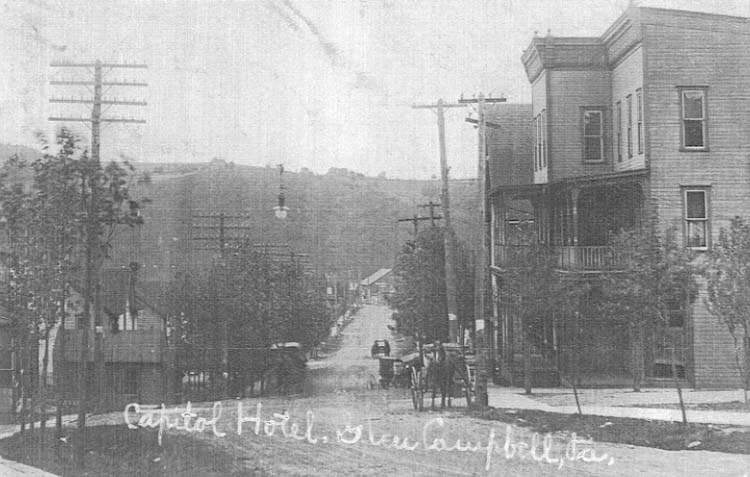
Glen Campbell, PA Capital Hotel

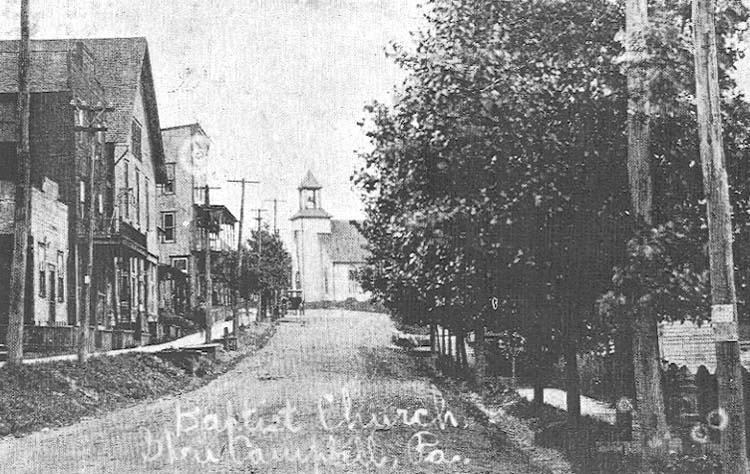
GC Baptist Church

The borough had its own bank, the First National Bank of Glen Campbell. A number of newspapers were published in the town for instance, The Glen Campbell Comet, H. E. Williams, Publisher, and many social organizations sprang up.

Unfortunately, the bubble burst. Labor unrest, the decline in coal output, the depletion of timber stocks, and a number of disastrous fires left Glen Campbell in serious financial condition. The Great Depression dealt the town its final blow. The bank closed permanently, and a number of businesses either folded or moved elsewhere. The community never recovered.

Although its heyday has long since passed, the town still has the capability of attracting fame. It received national attention in 1971 when Glen Campbell, the country music singer, made a surprise visit. The trip was featured in a TV Guide article later that year.

Although no longer the size it once was, Glen Campbell continues to function in its own right. The town's fire company provides fire protection to a number of communities in the area. Its three churches (Methodist, Baptist, and Roman Catholic) all have active congregations. Social organizations include the American Legion and the Glen Campbell Fireman's Auxiliary. The town's post office still provides rural services to a large area surrounding the borough. There are a number of businesses, including some which are coal related, that call Glen Campbell home.

The Sen. Joseph O. Clark House was listed on the National Register of Historic Places in 2011. This house is located in the area referred to by locals as "Candy Bank" or 247 First Avenue. Joseph O. Clark was a state senator from 1921 to 1924 for the 37th district. He was a Republican. He was "Born in Montgomery Township, Indiana County, September 7, 1871, the son of John W. and Adah S. (Hiddlesen) Clark; educated in public schools; Dickinson Seminary (Williamsport); Germantown Academy; Eastman Business College, Poughkeepsie; partner in lumber business at Glen Campbell, Pa.; organizer and board member, First National Bank, Glen Campbell; elected president of same, 1905; investor and director of numerous coal, oil, water, glass, and electric companies throughout the United States; president of Royal Oil and Gas Co., 1936; elected to state Senate, 1921-1924; died July 21, 1936.″'

== Geography ==
Glen Campbell is located at 40°49′9″N 78°49′35″W (40.819052, -78.826327).

According to the United States Census Bureau, the borough has a total area of 0.9 square miles (2.3 km^{2}), all land.

== Demographics ==
Historical population
Census	Pop.	Note	%±
1900	1,628		—
1910	1,099		−32.5%
1920	1,059		−3.6%
1930	588		−44.5%
1940	612		4.1%
1950	510		−16.7%
1960	400		−21.6%
1970	408		2.0%
1980	352		−13.7%
1990	313		−11.1%
2000	306		−2.2%
2010	245		−19.9%
2020	256		4.5%
2021 (est.)	253	▼	−1.2%

As of the census of 2000, there were 306 people, 109 households, and 74 families residing in the borough. The population density was 327.8 inhabitants per square mile (126.6/km^{2}). There were 125 housing units at an average density of 133.9 per square mile (51.7/km^{2}). The racial makeup of the borough was 100.00% White.

There were 109 households, out of which 28.4% had children under the age of 18 living with them, 47.7% were married couples living together, 14.7% had a female householder with no husband present, and 32.1% were non-families. 27.5% of all households were made up of individuals, and 15.6% had someone living alone who was 65 years of age or older. The average household size was 2.51 and the average family size was 3.03.

In the borough the population was spread out, with 22.9% under the age of 18, 5.2% from 18 to 24, 22.5% from 25 to 44, 25.8% from 45 to 64, and 23.5% who were 65 years of age or older. The median age was 44 years. For every 100 females there were 100.0 males. For every 100 females age 18 and over, there were 95.0 males.

The median income for a household in the borough was $24,063, and the median income for a family was $31,875. Males had a median income of $24,167 versus $14,688 for females. The per capita income for the borough was $12,039. About 9.6% of families and 16.5% of the population were below the poverty line, including 17.3% of those under the age of eighteen and 10.2% of those sixty five or over.
