= Streams in Jefferson County, Pennsylvania =

The following table lists all the named streams that flow in Jefferson County. For each stream, the name, coordinate of the source, name of the stream it flows into, coordinate of the confluence, and political subdivision in which the confluence is located are given.

This map depicts the watershed area for each named stream in Jefferson County, Pennsylvania.

Streams in Jefferson County, Pennsylvania
| Name | Source | Flows into | Mouth | Location | Area |
|---|---|---|---|---|---|
| Acy Run | 41°15′50″N 78°56′55″W | North Fork Creek | 41°15′04″N 78°56′31″W | Polk Township | 0.51 mi^{2} (1.3 km^{2}) |
| Baghdad Run | 41°15′26″N 78°47′59″W | Little Toby Creek | 41°16′53″N 78°46′45″W | Snyder Township | 1.28 mi^{2} (3.3 km^{2}) |
| Bear Run | 40°52′50″N 78°45′47″W (elev. 1,283 feet (391 m)) | West Branch Susquehanna River | 40°53′30″N 78°51′37″W | Banks Township, Indiana County | 1.36 mi^{2} (3.5 km^{2}) |
| Bearpen Run | 41°18′45″N 78°54′16″W | North Fork Creek | 41°18′14″N 78°51′21″W | Polk Township | 1.86 mi^{2} (4.8 km^{2}) |
| Beaver Meadow Run | 41°15′21″N 78°54′53″W | South Branch North Fork Redbank Creek | 41°15′58″N 78°51′29″W | Polk Township | 3.33 mi^{2} (8.6 km^{2}) |
| Beaver Run | 41°05′21″N 79°10′57″W | Redbank Creek | 41°03′47″N 79°05′41″W | Beaver Township | 3.04 mi^{2} (7.9 km^{2}) |
| Beaver Run | 41°14′32″N 78°57′23″W | Seneca Run | 41°12′59″N 78°56′10″W | Warsaw Township | 9.95 mi^{2} (25.8 km^{2}) |
| Beaver Run | 41°05′21″N 79°10′57″W | Redbank Creek | 41°03′47″N 79°05′41″W | Beaver Township | 0.72 mi^{2} (1.9 km^{2}) |
| Beaverdam Run | 41°09′27″N 78°49′41″W | Falls Creek | 41°12′46″N 78°52′29″W | Washington Township | 6.56 mi^{2} (17.0 km^{2}) |
| Beer Run | 41°15′39″N 79°12′23″W | Updike Run | 41°16′13″N 79°10′53″W | Eldred Township | 1.18 mi^{2} (3.1 km^{2}) |
| Big Run | 40°58′05″N 78°53′21″W | Mahoning Creek | 41°01′40″N 78°56′57″W | Big Run | 19.41 mi^{2} (50.3 km^{2}) |
| Big Run | 41°01′30″N 79°07′56″W | Little Sandy Creek | 40°58′16″N 79°02′03″W | Ringgold Township | 14.85 mi^{2} (38.5 km^{2}) |
| Black Run | 41°18′15″N 79°08′33″W | Cathers Run | 41°16′57″N 79°05′57″W | Barnett Township | 2.54 mi^{2} (6.6 km^{2}) |
| Bliss Run | 41°17′18″N 78°50′06″W | Little Toby Creek | 41°17′00″N 78°50′26″W | Snyder Township | 0.22 mi^{2} (0.57 km^{2}) |
| Brocious Run | 41°02′25″N 79°12′06″W | Little Sandy Creek | 41°02′58″N 79°11′23″W | Beaver Township | 0.66 mi^{2} (1.7 km^{2}) |
| Buck Run | 41°02′42″N 78°49′21″W | Stump Creek | 41°02′24″N 78°51′08″W | Sykesville | 1.1 mi^{2} (2.8 km^{2}) |
| Burns Run | 41°12′50″N 79°03′23″W | North Fork Creek | 41°12′21″N 79°01′27″W | Warsaw Township | 8.49 mi^{2} (22.0 km^{2}) |
| Bushley Run | 41°15′50″N 78°55′42″W | South Branch North Fork Redbank Creek | 41°15′04″N 78°55′44″W | Polk Township | 0.66 mi^{2} (1.7 km^{2}) |
| Cable Run | 41°06′52″N 78°59′48″W | Sandy Lick Creek | 41°07′43″N 78°58′51″W | Pine Creek Township | 1.09 mi^{2} (2.8 km^{2}) |
| Callen Run | 41°21′01″N 79°00′54″W | Clarion River | 41°18′50″N 78°57′43″W | Heath Township | 7.37 mi^{2} (19.1 km^{2}) |
| Camp Run | 41°05′19″N 78°58′00″W | Sandy Lick Creek | 41°02′30″N 78°56′54″W | Knox Township | 7.26 mi^{2} (18.8 km^{2}) |
| Campbell Run | 41°09′14″N 79°07′42″W | Coder Run | 41°10′40″N 79°06′35″W | Rose Township | 2.58 mi^{2} (6.7 km^{2}) |
| Canoe Creek | 40°56′13″N 78°56′15″W | Mahoning Creek | 40°54′06″N 79°00′32″W | Bell Township | 11.57 mi^{2} (30.0 km^{2}) |
| Carrier Run | 41°06′32″N 79°11′58″W | Redbank Creek | 41°06′55″N 79°10′35″W | Clover Township | 1.06 mi^{2} (2.7 km^{2}) |
| Cathers Run | 41°19′00″N 79°14′01″W | Clarion River | 41°15′00″N 79°06′59″W | Millcreek Township | 15.69 mi^{2} (40.6 km^{2}) |
| Caylor Run | 40°58′05″N 79°10′14″W | Pine Run | 40°59′41″N 79°09′02″W | Ringgold Township | 1.59 mi^{2} (4.1 km^{2}) |
| Cherry Run | 41°01′58″N 79°11′05″W | Little Sandy Creek | 40°59′04″N 79°10′12″W | Ringgold Township | 5.54 mi^{2} (14.3 km^{2}) |
| Chicken Run | 41°20′17″N 78°55′09″W | Stony Run | 41°20′00″N 78°55′00″W | Polk Township | 0.25 mi^{2} (0.65 km^{2}) |
| Clarion River | 41°06′59″N 79°40′30″W | Allegheny River | 41°29′28″N 78°40′41″W | Perry Township | 130.5 mi^{2} (338 km^{2}) |
| Clawson Run | 41°18′02″N 79°12′38″W (elev. 1,237 feet (377 m)) | Cathers Run | 41°16′48″N 79°12′39″W | Millcreek Township, Clarion County | 0.5 mi^{2} (1.3 km^{2}) |
| Clear Creek | 41°19′46″N 79°06′12″W | Clarion River | 41°19′09″N 79°00′28″W | Barnett Township | 20.12 mi^{2} (52.1 km^{2}) |
| Clear Run | 41°15′20″N 79°02′30″W | North Fork Creek | 41°19′02″N 78°59′16″W | Warsaw Township | 9.79 mi^{2} (25.4 km^{2}) |
| Clemens Run | 41°16′11″N 79°02′20″W | Clear Run | 41°17′20″N 79°03′24″W | Warsaw Township | 1.71 mi^{2} (4.4 km^{2}) |
| Clement Run | 41°08′37″N 79°06′56″W | Redbank Creek | 41°10′34″N 79°06′16″W | Rose Township | 10.3 mi^{2} (27 km^{2}) |
| Clover Run | 40°57′49″N 78°50′58″W | East Branch Mahoning Creek | 40°56′15″N 78°47′19″W | Gaskill Township | 6.57 mi^{2} (17.0 km^{2}) |
| Clutch Run | 41°01′41″N 79°02′40″W | Little Sandy Creek | 41°00′53″N 78°59′35″W | Oliver Township | 7.44 mi^{2} (19.3 km^{2}) |
| Coder Run | 41°08′43″N 79°06′54″W | Clement Run | 41°10′46″N 79°11′03″W | Rose Township | 7.92 mi^{2} (20.5 km^{2}) |
| Cold Spring Run | 40°57′07″N 78°57′52″W | Elk Run | 40°58′37″N 78°56′59″W | Punxsutawney | 0.95 mi^{2} (2.5 km^{2}) |
| Couch Run | 40°55′26″N 78°55′35″W | Ugly Run | 40°55′34″N 78°53′43″W | Bell Township | 1.5 mi^{2} (3.9 km^{2}) |
| Craft Run | 41°14′04″N 79°02′30″W | North Fork Creek | 41°14′49″N 79°05′45″W | Warsaw Township | 3.11 mi^{2} (8.1 km^{2}) |
| Curry Run | 41°14′50″N 78°47′45″W | Little Toby Creek | 41°13′32″N 78°49′17″W | Brockway | 1.95 mi^{2} (5.1 km^{2}) |
| Daugherty Run | 41°22′11″N 78°57′38″W | Clarion River | 41°21′27″N 78°56′22″W | Heath Township | 0.35 mi^{2} (0.91 km^{2}) |
| Davis Run | 41°17′45″N 78°55′41″W (elev. 1,489 feet (454 m)) | Hetrick Run | 41°19′28″N 78°56′20″W | Polk Township | 1.19 mi^{2} (3.1 km^{2}) |
| Dice Run | 41°18′03″N 79°00′31″W | Clear Run | 41°19′00″N 78°58′55″W | Polk Township | 1.2 mi^{2} (3.1 km^{2}) |
| Dry Run | 41°18′49″N 79°03′52″W | Clear Creek | 41°18′08″N 79°03′01″W | Heath Township | 0.62 mi^{2} (1.6 km^{2}) |
| Eagle Run | 40°57′53″N 79°12′00″W | Pine Run | 40°59′48″N 79°11′23″W | Timblin | 1.73 mi^{2} (4.5 km^{2}) |
| East Branch Mahoning Creek | 40°58′26″N 78°51′22″W | Mahoning Creek | 41°02′19″N 78°42′18″W | Gaskill Township | 15.27 mi^{2} (39.5 km^{2}) |
| East Branch Walburn Run | 41°16′05″N 78°46′03″W | Walburn Run | 41°17′37″N 78°45′18″W | Snyder Township | 0.2 mi^{2} (0.52 km^{2}) |
| Eckler Run | 41°05′22″N 79°08′45″W | Beaver Run | 41°06′29″N 79°07′05″W | Beaver Township | 1.62 mi^{2} (4.2 km^{2}) |
| Elk Run | 40°56′57″N 78°57′52″W | Mahoning Creek | 41°01′18″N 78°59′02″W | Punxsutawney | 13.2 mi^{2} (34 km^{2}) |
| English Run | 41°18′02″N 79°04′47″W | Trap Run | 41°17′14″N 79°05′38″W | Heath Township | 8.38 mi^{2} (21.7 km^{2}) |
| Falls Creek | 41°08′58″N 78°47′59″W | Wolf Run | 41°09′34″N 78°50′18″W | Washington Township | 11.39 mi^{2} (29.5 km^{2}) |
| Fehley Run | 41°05′31″N 78°51′13″W | Soldier Run | 41°06′39″N 78°49′36″W | Winslow Township | 1.58 mi^{2} (4.1 km^{2}) |
| Ferguson Run | 41°02′06″N 79°10′12″W | Little Sandy Creek | 41°03′37″N 79°07′56″W | Beaver Township | 3.77 mi^{2} (9.8 km^{2}) |
| Fivemile Run | 41°08′54″N 79°04′32″W | Redbank Creek | 41°06′11″N 79°01′41″W | Brookville | 17.55 mi^{2} (45.5 km^{2}) |
| Fivemile Run | 41°09′40″N 79°00′04″W | Mill Creek | 41°08′28″N 78°55′28″W | Pine Creek Township | 8.08 mi^{2} (20.9 km^{2}) |
| Foundry Run | 40°54′37″N 79°13′15″W (elev. 1,096 feet (334 m)) | Mahoning Creek | 40°55′55″N 79°11′20″W | Porter Township | 1.56 mi^{2} (4.0 km^{2}) |
| Foundry Run | 40°55′11″N 79°04′58″W | Mahoning Creek | 40°57′16″N 79°06′46″W | Perry Township | 3.75 mi^{2} (9.7 km^{2}) |
| Fowler Run | 41°17′14″N 79°09′25″W | Seaton Run | 41°16′44″N 79°09′27″W | Eldred Township | 0.62 mi^{2} (1.6 km^{2}) |
| Front Run | 41°04′17″N 78°53′53″W | Trout Run | 41°02′54″N 78°54′01″W | Winslow Township | 2.62 mi^{2} (6.8 km^{2}) |
| Fuller Run | 41°05′51″N 78°59′21″W | Sandy Lick Creek | 41°04′28″N 79°00′19″W | Knox Township | 1.63 mi^{2} (4.2 km^{2}) |
| Graffius Run | 40°57′13″N 78°55′42″W | Mahoning Creek | 40°58′58″N 78°56′11″W | Bell Township | 1.63 mi^{2} (4.2 km^{2}) |
| Hadden Run | 41°01′10″N 79°02′38″W | Clutch Run | 41°00′27″N 79°01′01″W | Oliver Township | 4.18 mi^{2} (10.8 km^{2}) |
| Hamilton Run | 40°53′58″N 79°09′47″W (elev. 1,129 feet (344 m)) | Mahoning Creek | 40°56′38″N 79°08′32″W | Porter Township | 3.24 mi^{2} (8.4 km^{2}) |
| Harveys Run | 41°10′20″N 78°47′12″W | Wolf Run | 41°11′56″N 78°48′45″W | Washington Township | 1.62 mi^{2} (4.2 km^{2}) |
| Hetrick Run | 41°17′43″N 78°55′36″W (elev. 1,489 feet (454 m)) | North Fork Creek | 41°17′55″N 78°58′00″W | Polk Township | 2.58 mi^{2} (6.7 km^{2}) |
| Hickok Run | 41°02′04″N 79°01′54″W | Little Sandy Creek | 41°01′50″N 79°00′04″W | Oliver Township | 1.69 mi^{2} (4.4 km^{2}) |
| Horm Run | 41°10′31″N 78°56′26″W | Mill Creek | 41°09′57″N 78°52′40″W | Washington Township | 6.65 mi^{2} (17.2 km^{2}) |
| Hugh Run | 41°13′21″N 79°09′45″W | Mill Creek | 41°14′14″N 79°08′37″W | Eldred Township | 1.1 mi^{2} (2.8 km^{2}) |
| Hunts Run | 41°07′20″N 79°05′03″W | Fivemile Run | 41°06′57″N 79°04′39″W | Knox Township | 0.29 mi^{2} (0.75 km^{2}) |
| Indiancamp Run | 41°01′56″N 79°03′01″W | Little Sandy Creek | 41°04′59″N 79°01′32″W | Oliver Township | 5.82 mi^{2} (15.1 km^{2}) |
| Jackson Run | 40°56′46″N 78°55′41″W | Mahoning Creek | 40°56′33″N 78°52′57″W | Bell Township | 3.12 mi^{2} (8.1 km^{2}) |
| Jenkins Run | 41°16′38″N 78°49′02″W | Little Toby Creek | 41°17′59″N 78°46′57″W | Snyder Township | 1.37 mi^{2} (3.5 km^{2}) |
| Johns Run | 41°20′41″N 79°00′41″W | Callen Run | 41°19′43″N 78°59′15″W | Heath Township | 3.14 mi^{2} (8.1 km^{2}) |
| Kahle Run | 41°17′56″N 79°11′38″W | Cathers Run | 41°16′22″N 79°10′14″W | Barnett Township | 2.5 mi^{2} (6.5 km^{2}) |
| Keys Run | 41°10′10″N 78°55′27″W | Horm Run | 41°11′33″N 78°53′45″W | Washington Township | 2.13 mi^{2} (5.5 km^{2}) |
| Kyle Run | 41°09′22″N 78°51′21″W | Kyle Lake | 41°11′02″N 78°53′20″W | Washington Township | 2.74 mi^{2} (7.1 km^{2}) |
| Kyle Run | 41°12′18″N 79°12′28″W | Little Mill Creek | 41°11′20″N 79°12′13″W | Union Township | 0.87 mi^{2} (2.3 km^{2}) |
| Laurel Run | 40°59′08″N 78°48′35″W | East Branch Mahoning Creek | 40°57′47″N 78°45′57″W | Henderson Township | 0.71 mi^{2} (1.8 km^{2}) |
| Laurel Run | 41°01′46″N 78°54′28″W | Big Run | 41°02′43″N 78°55′27″W | McCalmont Township | 1.33 mi^{2} (3.4 km^{2}) |
| Laurel Run | 41°11′01″N 79°00′13″W | Little Mill Creek | 41°12′13″N 78°56′39″W | Pine Creek Township | 3.34 mi^{2} (8.7 km^{2}) |
| Leeper Run | 41°21′16″N 79°02′32″W | Clarion River | 41°20′06″N 79°01′59″W | Heath Township | 1.35 mi^{2} (3.5 km^{2}) |
| Lick Run | 41°02′42″N 79°05′22″W | Little Sandy Creek | 41°04′39″N 79°05′28″W | Oliver Township | 2.72 mi^{2} (7.0 km^{2}) |
| Little Clear Creek | 41°19′19″N 79°04′37″W | Clear Creek | 41°19′31″N 79°02′35″W | Heath Township | 1.06 mi^{2} (2.7 km^{2}) |
| Little Elk Run | 40°58′29″N 78°58′41″W | Elk Run | 40°59′40″N 79°00′56″W | Young Township | 3.58 mi^{2} (9.3 km^{2}) |
| Little Mill Creek | 41°09′44″N 79°02′01″W | Mill Creek | 41°12′11″N 78°57′35″W | Pine Creek Township | 6.26 mi^{2} (16.2 km^{2}) |
| Little Mill Creek | 41°13′21″N 79°15′02″W | Mill Creek | 41°11′51″N 79°08′31″W | Millcreek Township | 7.86 mi^{2} (20.4 km^{2}) |
| Little Piney Creek | 41°08′20″N 79°21′07″W (elev. 1,211 feet (369 m)) | Piney Creek | 41°11′09″N 79°12′43″W | Clarion Township, Clarion County | 0.12 mi^{2} (0.31 km^{2}) |
| Little Sandy Creek | 41°02′44″N 79°13′48″W | Redbank Creek | 41°01′39″N 78°57′31″W | Redbank Township | 70.65 mi^{2} (183.0 km^{2}) |
| Little Toby Creek | 41°21′59″N 78°49′25″W | Clarion River | 41°19′55″N 78°36′32″W | Spring Creek Township | 34.46 mi^{2} (89.3 km^{2}) |
| Little Vineyard Run | 41°18′06″N 78°49′34″W | Little Toby Creek | 41°17′44″N 78°48′07″W | Snyder Township | 0.68 mi^{2} (1.8 km^{2}) |
| Long Run | 41°12′27″N 79°11′57″W | Little Mill Creek | 41°13′15″N 79°12′07″W | Union Township | 0.47 mi^{2} (1.2 km^{2}) |
| Lost Run | 40°56′21″N 78°49′16″W | Clover Run | 40°56′59″N 78°46′09″W | Gaskill Township | 0.68 mi^{2} (1.8 km^{2}) |
| Lucas Run | 41°17′04″N 78°55′35″W | North Fork Creek | 41°16′44″N 78°52′33″W | Polk Township | 3.39 mi^{2} (8.8 km^{2}) |
| Mahoning Creek | 40°55′59″N 79°27′40″W (elev. 801 feet (244 m)) | Allegheny River | 40°58′26″N 78°51′22″W | Henderson Township | 149.63 mi^{2} (387.5 km^{2}) |
| Mammy Hi Run | 41°17′46″N 78°56′21″W (elev. 1,545 feet (471 m)) | Hetrick Run | 41°19′16″N 78°56′58″W | Polk Township | 1.26 mi^{2} (3.3 km^{2}) |
| Manners Dam Run | 41°18′16″N 78°54′44″W | North Fork Creek | 41°17′16″N 78°52′41″W | Polk Township | 3.14 mi^{2} (8.1 km^{2}) |
| Martin Run | 41°13′42″N 79°10′27″W | Mill Creek | 41°16′10″N 79°09′59″W | Eldred Township | 0.86 mi^{2} (2.2 km^{2}) |
| Matson Run | 41°10′05″N 79°04′29″W (elev. 1,209 feet (369 m)) | North Fork Creek | 41°10′40″N 79°05′32″W | Rose Township | 0.49 mi^{2} (1.3 km^{2}) |
| McCracken Run | 40°59′16″N 79°05′02″W | Big Run | 40°57′58″N 79°03′51″W | Oliver Township | 2.77 mi^{2} (7.2 km^{2}) |
| McCreight Run | 41°04′59″N 78°52′09″W | Soldier Run | 41°03′42″N 78°51′39″W | Winslow Township | 1.21 mi^{2} (3.1 km^{2}) |
| McEwen Run | 41°13′02″N 78°46′33″W | Rattlesnake Run | 41°12′18″N 78°43′00″W | Washington Township | 2.67 mi^{2} (6.9 km^{2}) |
| McKee Run | 41°00′43″N 78°53′50″W | Big Run | 41°00′53″N 78°51′15″W | McCalmont Township | 2.65 mi^{2} (6.9 km^{2}) |
| Middle Branch Little Sandy Creek | 41°02′20″N 79°01′30″W | Little Sandy Creek | 41°03′58″N 79°00′35″W | Oliver Township | 2.21 mi^{2} (5.7 km^{2}) |
| Middle Branch Pine Run | 40°57′54″N 79°08′57″W | Pine Run | 40°56′53″N 79°07′39″W | Porter Township | 1.8 mi^{2} (4.7 km^{2}) |
| Mill Creek | 41°09′22″N 79°03′11″W | Sandy Lick Creek | 41°14′53″N 78°49′18″W | Pine Creek Township | 53.69 mi^{2} (139.1 km^{2}) |
| Mill Creek | 41°14′08″N 79°19′16″W | Clarion River | 41°15′32″N 79°06′35″W | Millcreek Township | 30.7 mi^{2} (80 km^{2}) |
| Miller Run | 41°16′19″N 79°04′43″W | Tarkiln Run | 41°16′55″N 79°05′44″W | Eldred Township | 0.78 mi^{2} (2.0 km^{2}) |
| Muddy Run | 41°19′08″N 78°53′59″W | North Fork Creek | 41°19′37″N 78°55′03″W | Polk Township | 1.28 mi^{2} (3.3 km^{2}) |
| Nicely Run | 40°55′28″N 79°03′06″W | Mahoning Creek | 40°56′50″N 79°04′33″W | Perry Township | 1.34 square miles (3.5 km^{2}) |
| Nolf Run | 41°02′21″N 79°13′06″W (elev. 1,109 feet (338 m)) | Little Sandy Creek | 41°00′11″N 79°12′24″W | Ringgold Township, Jefferson County | 1.68 mi^{2} (4.4 km^{2}) |
| North Fork Creek | 41°09′30″N 79°04′36″W | Redbank Creek | 41°19′07″N 78°53′59″W | Brookville | 91.63 mi^{2} (237.3 km^{2}) |
| Nye Branch | 40°57′45″N 79°13′17″W (elev. 1,204 feet (367 m)) | Pine Run | 40°56′37″N 79°09′29″W | Porter Township | 3.84 square miles (9.9 km^{2}) |
| O'Donnell Run | 41°05′46″N 78°56′22″W | Sandy Lick Creek | 41°08′17″N 78°55′16″W | Winslow Township | 3.63 mi^{2} (9.4 km^{2}) |
| Painter Run | 40°54′28″N 78°56′50″W (elev. 1,286 feet (392 m)) | Canoe Creek | 40°55′33″N 78°59′01″W | Young Township | 2.62 mi^{2} (6.8 km^{2}) |
| Painter Run | 40°58′00″N 79°12′39″W | Pine Run | 40°59′59″N 79°11′33″W | Timblin | 1.68 square miles (4.4 km^{2}) |
| Panther Run | 41°07′18″N 78°52′26″W | Sandy Lick Creek | 41°08′43″N 78°53′29″W | Winslow Township | 2.09 mi^{2} (5.4 km^{2}) |
| Parks Run | 41°14′20″N 79°08′03″W | Mill Creek | 41°15′17″N 79°06′50″W | Eldred Township | 1.36 mi^{2} (3.5 km^{2}) |
| Patton Run | 41°03′32″N 79°12′13″W | Redbank Creek | 41°05′40″N 79°12′55″W | Beaver Township | 1.12 mi^{2} (2.9 km^{2}) |
| Pekin Run | 41°12′50″N 79°03′23″W | North Fork Creek | 41°13′12″N 78°58′09″W | Warsaw Township | 10.12 mi^{2} (26.2 km^{2}) |
| Perryville Run | 40°55′20″N 79°04′46″W | Mahoning Creek | 40°57′41″N 79°05′51″W | Perry Township | 2.27 square miles (5.9 km^{2}) |
| Phyllis Run | 41°19′28″N 79°04′47″W | Clear Creek | 41°20′08″N 79°04′16″W | Heath Township | 0.52 mi^{2} (1.3 km^{2}) |
| Pine Run | 40°56′47″N 79°16′39″W | Mahoning Creek | 40°58′10″N 79°06′29″W | Redbank Township | 18.88 mi^{2} (48.9 km^{2}) |
| Pine Run | 41°21′00″N 79°03′35″W | Clarion River | 41°19′51″N 79°02′44″W | Heath Township | 1.47 mi^{2} (3.8 km^{2}) |
| Pitchpine Run | 41°05′47″N 78°53′33″W | Sandy Lick Creek | 41°06′47″N 78°51′15″W | Reynoldsville | 1.94 mi^{2} (5.0 km^{2}) |
| Poose Run | 41°02′00″N 78°49′15″W | Stump Creek | 41°02′02″N 78°46′44″W | Henderson Township | 0.62 mi^{2} (1.6 km^{2}) |
| Rankin Run | 41°13′47″N 79°11′13″W | Mill Creek | 41°15′45″N 79°11′18″W | Eldred Township | 1.61 mi^{2} (4.2 km^{2}) |
| Rattlesnake Creek | 41°14′14″N 78°46′53″W | Little Toby Creek | 41°13′37″N 78°40′24″W | Snyder Township | 14.08 mi^{2} (36.5 km^{2}) |
| Rattlesnake Run | 41°08′04″N 79°08′36″W | Redbank Creek | 41°06′45″N 79°06′39″W | Clover Township | 8.51 mi^{2} (22.0 km^{2}) |
| Rattlesnake Run | 41°13′10″N 78°46′26″W | Rattlesnake Creek | 41°12′44″N 78°51′59″W | Snyder Township | 1.82 mi^{2} (4.7 km^{2}) |
| Raught Run | 41°22′10″N 78°57′50″W | Clarion River | 41°20′10″N 78°58′00″W | Heath Township | 2.14 mi^{2} (5.5 km^{2}) |
| Red Lick Run | 41°11′59″N 79°03′59″W | North Fork Creek | 41°14′07″N 79°06′05″W | Pine Creek Township | 3.32 mi^{2} (8.6 km^{2}) |
| Red Run | 41°03′55″N 79°11′23″W | Redbank Creek | 41°03′35″N 79°10′02″W | Beaver Township | 0.77 mi^{2} (2.0 km^{2}) |
| Redbank Creek | 40°58′55″N 79°33′00″W | Allegheny River | 41°09′30″N 79°04′36″W | Madison Township | 375.52 mi^{2} (972.6 km^{2}) |
| Reitz Run | 41°02′33″N 79°09′15″W | Ferguson Run | 41°04′00″N 79°08′12″W | Beaver Township | 1.69 mi^{2} (4.4 km^{2}) |
| Rock Run | 40°57′58″N 78°54′29″W | Mahoning Creek | 40°58′37″N 78°55′58″W | Bell Township | 1.49 mi^{2} (3.9 km^{2}) |
| Rose Run | 40°55′58″N 79°01′52″W | Mahoning Creek | 40°57′40″N 79°03′13″W | Perry Township | 3.93 mi^{2} (10.2 km^{2}) |
| Runaway Run | 41°06′58″N 79°11′44″W | Redbank Creek | 41°09′47″N 79°13′10″W | Summerville | 1.48 mi^{2} (3.8 km^{2}) |
| Sandy Lick Creek | 41°09′30″N 79°04′36″W | Redbank Creek | 41°11′44″N 78°40′19″W | Brookville | 143.35 mi^{2} (371.3 km^{2}) |
| Sawmill Run | 40°56′29″N 78°59′19″W | Mahoning Creek | 40°59′03″N 79°01′16″W | Punxsutawney | 4.26 mi^{2} (11.0 km^{2}) |
| Schoolhouse Run | 41°05′29″N 78°55′24″W | Sandy Lick Creek | 41°07′48″N 78°54′08″W | Winslow Township | 3.43 mi^{2} (8.9 km^{2}) |
| Seaton Run | 41°17′57″N 79°09′38″W | Cathers Run | 41°16′01″N 79°06′39″W | Barnett Township | 4.07 mi^{2} (10.5 km^{2}) |
| Seneca Run | 41°15′26″N 78°57′43″W | North Fork Creek | 41°12′34″N 78°56′27″W | Warsaw Township | 6.21 mi^{2} (16.1 km^{2}) |
| Shippen Run | 41°14′41″N 79°02′57″W | North Fork Creek | 41°16′37″N 79°05′58″W | Warsaw Township | 3.56 mi^{2} (9.2 km^{2}) |
| Simpson Run | 41°08′00″N 79°09′25″W | Redbank Creek | 41°10′16″N 79°11′02″W | Clover Township | 2.04 mi^{2} (5.3 km^{2}) |
| Smathers Run | 41°06′26″N 79°05′39″W | Fivemile Run | 41°04′57″N 79°05′46″W | Rose Township | 2.23 mi^{2} (5.8 km^{2}) |
| Smith Run | 40°55′00″N 78°55′14″W | Ugly Run | 40°55′24″N 78°54′00″W | Bell Township | 0.97 mi^{2} (2.5 km^{2}) |
| Soldier Run | 41°05′21″N 78°53′33″W | Sandy Lick Creek | 41°05′20″N 78°47′13″W | Reynoldsville | 11.09 mi^{2} (28.7 km^{2}) |
| South Branch North Fork Redbank Creek | 41°16′09″N 78°56′08″W | North Fork Creek | 41°17′32″N 78°52′06″W | Polk Township | 6.88 mi^{2} (17.8 km^{2}) |
| Steele Run | 41°11′52″N 79°07′08″W | Mill Creek | 41°11′36″N 79°08′14″W | Eldred Township | 1.05 mi^{2} (2.7 km^{2}) |
| Steer Run | 40°54′16″N 79°07′49″W (elev. 1,165 feet (355 m)) | Mahoning Creek | 40°55′55″N 79°07′33″W | Porter Township | 1.31 mi^{2} (3.4 km^{2}) |
| Stony Run | 40°56′28″N 78°49′46″W | Clover Run | 40°55′02″N 78°50′27″W | Gaskill Township | 1.38 mi^{2} (3.6 km^{2}) |
| Stony Run | 41°20′17″N 78°55′09″W (elev. 1,453 feet (443 m)) | Maxwell Run | 41°20′00″N 78°55′00″W | Polk Township, Jefferson County | 3.75 mi^{2} (9.7 km^{2}) |
| Stump Creek | 40°58′26″N 78°51′22″W | Mahoning Creek | 41°02′57″N 78°42′36″W | Henderson Township | 14.86 mi^{2} (38.5 km^{2}) |
| Sugar Camp Run | 41°10′37″N 79°04′26″W | North Fork Creek | 41°11′16″N 79°06′20″W | Rose Township | 1.18 mi^{2} (3.1 km^{2}) |
| Sugarcamp Run | 40°53′45″N 79°11′32″W (elev. 1,112 feet (339 m)) | Mahoning Creek | 40°55′39″N 79°09′44″W | Porter Township, Jefferson County | 2.05 mi^{2} (5.3 km^{2}) |
| Sugarcamp Run | 41°03′01″N 78°49′03″W | Stump Creek | 41°04′52″N 78°48′56″W | Sykesville | 2.68 mi^{2} (6.9 km^{2}) |
| Sugarcamp Run | 41°11′07″N 79°04′29″W | North Fork Creek | 41°11′59″N 79°01′32″W | Pine Creek Township | 3.6 mi^{2} (9.3 km^{2}) |
| Swamp Run | 41°08′41″N 79°04′37″W | Fivemile Run | 41°06′25″N 79°01′50″W | Pine Creek Township | 4.6 mi^{2} (12 km^{2}) |
| Swede Run | 41°16′51″N 78°54′58″W | Lucas Run | 41°17′07″N 78°53′55″W | Polk Township | 1.21 mi^{2} (3.1 km^{2}) |
| Tadler Run | 41°19′49″N 79°07′28″W | Clarion River | 41°18′41″N 79°06′57″W | Barnett Township | 0.72 mi^{2} (1.9 km^{2}) |
| Tarkiln Run | 41°04′13″N 79°11′12″W | Redbank Creek | 41°04′26″N 79°08′50″W | Beaver Township | 2.22 mi^{2} (5.7 km^{2}) |
| Tarkiln Run | 41°15′16″N 79°02′40″W | North Fork Creek | 41°16′45″N 79°04′34″W | Warsaw Township | 3.14 mi^{2} (8.1 km^{2}) |
| Thompson Run | 41°07′59″N 79°09′02″W | Redbank Creek | 41°09′12″N 79°09′36″W | Clover Township | 1.15 mi^{2} (3.0 km^{2}) |
| Trap Run | 41°18′50″N 79°04′03″W | Clear Creek | 41°17′06″N 79°04′25″W | Heath Township | 10.44 mi^{2} (27.0 km^{2}) |
| Trout Run | 40°58′33″N 78°53′11″W | Big Run | 41°00′28″N 78°56′07″W | Henderson Township | 3.15 mi^{2} (8.2 km^{2}) |
| Trout Run | 41°05′14″N 78°54′35″W | Sandy Lick Creek | 41°03′25″N 78°50′55″W | Winslow Township | 10.74 mi^{2} (27.8 km^{2}) |
| Truby Run | 41°19′38″N 79°05′32″W | Clear Creek | 41°17′18″N 79°06′26″W | Heath Township | 2.31 mi^{2} (6.0 km^{2}) |
| Turnip Run | 41°01′16″N 78°54′16″W | Big Run | 41°01′22″N 78°56′47″W | McCalmont Township | 1.79 mi^{2} (4.6 km^{2}) |
| Ugly Run | 40°55′32″N 78°55′58″W | Canoe Creek | 40°54′24″N 78°51′13″W | Bell Township | 3.85 mi^{2} (10.0 km^{2}) |
| Updike Run | 41°14′04″N 79°12′21″W | Mill Creek | 41°16′44″N 79°12′07″W | Eldred Township | 2.76 mi^{2} (7.1 km^{2}) |
| Walburn Run | 41°14′32″N 78°46′00″W | Little Toby Creek | 41°16′04″N 78°46′04″W | Snyder Township | 1.37 mi^{2} (3.5 km^{2}) |
| Welch Run | 41°07′29″N 79°10′53″W | Redbank Creek | 41°10′49″N 79°11′51″W | Clover Township | 4.07 mi^{2} (10.5 km^{2}) |
| West Branch Walburn Run | 41°16′05″N 78°46′03″W | Walburn Run | 41°19′02″N 78°45′02″W | Snyder Township | 0.44 mi^{2} (1.1 km^{2}) |
| Whetstone Branch | 41°14′59″N 78°44′24″W (elev. 1,460 feet (450 m)) | Little Toby Creek | 41°15′11″N 78°38′56″W | Horton Township, Elk County | 0.02 mi^{2} (0.052 km^{2}) |
| Williams Run | 41°19′07″N 78°53′59″W | North Fork Creek | 41°18′53″N 78°51′33″W | Polk Township | 1.78 mi^{2} (4.6 km^{2}) |
| Windfall Run | 40°58′46″N 78°52′59″W | Big Run | 41°00′48″N 78°52′00″W | Henderson Township | 1.74 mi^{2} (4.5 km^{2}) |
| Windfall Run | 41°15′10″N 79°01′45″W | North Fork Creek | 41°18′16″N 78°58′25″W | Warsaw Township | 5.91 mi^{2} (15.3 km^{2}) |
| Wolf Run | 41°08′14″N 78°47′35″W | Sandy Lick Creek | 41°11′54″N 78°42′46″W | Sandy Township | 18.19 mi^{2} (47.1 km^{2}) |
| Work Run | 41°16′18″N 79°01′56″W | Clear Run | 41°16′38″N 79°00′01″W | Warsaw Township | 1.3 mi^{2} (3.4 km^{2}) |
| Yeomans Run | 41°11′15″N 79°04′35″W | North Fork Creek | 41°11′42″N 79°05′45″W | Rose Township | 0.72 mi^{2} (1.9 km^{2}) |
