= Washington Township, Jefferson County, Pennsylvania =

Township in Pennsylvania, US

Coordinates: 41°10′00″N 78°54′59″W

- Township
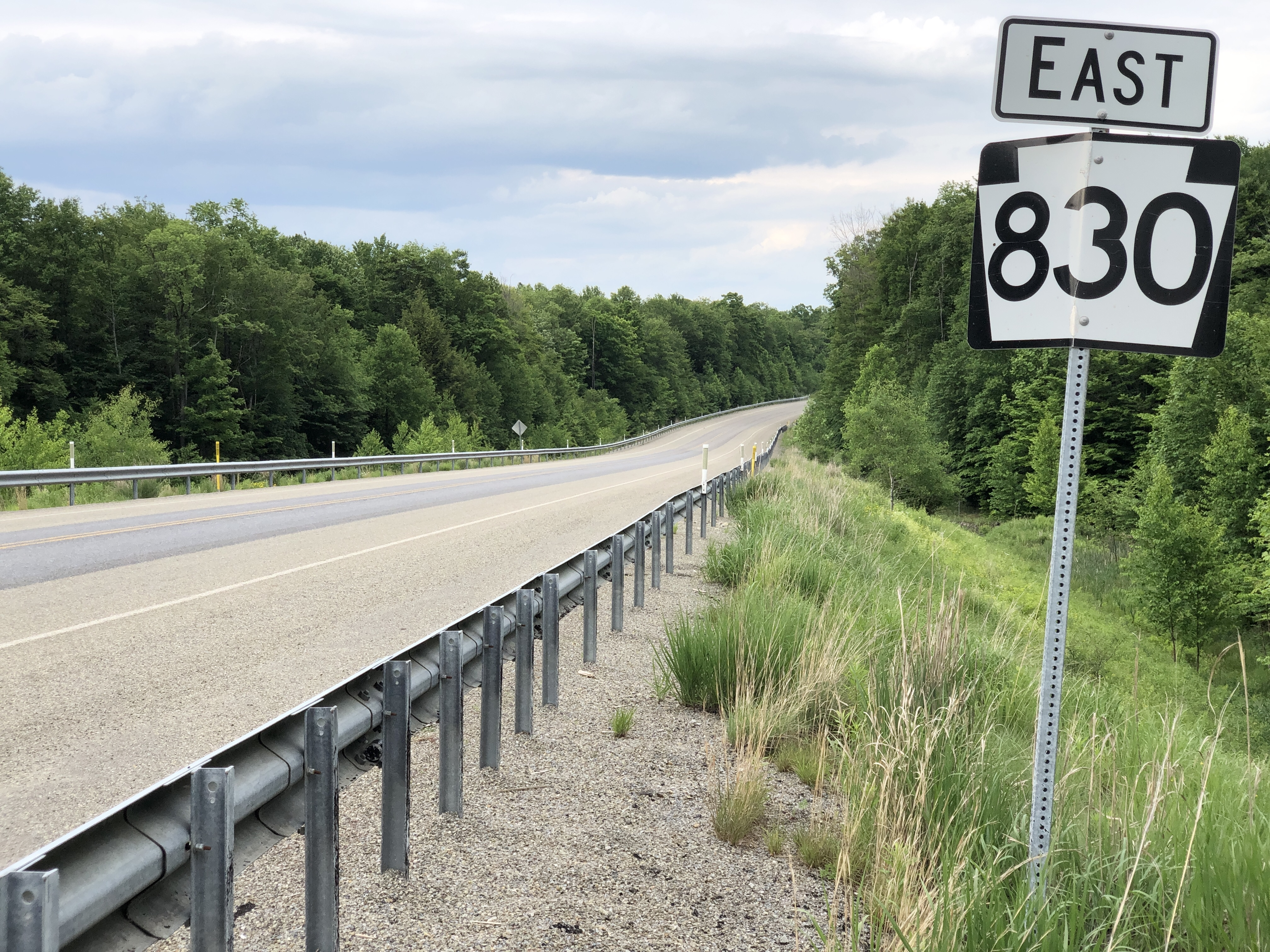
- PA 830 in Washington Township

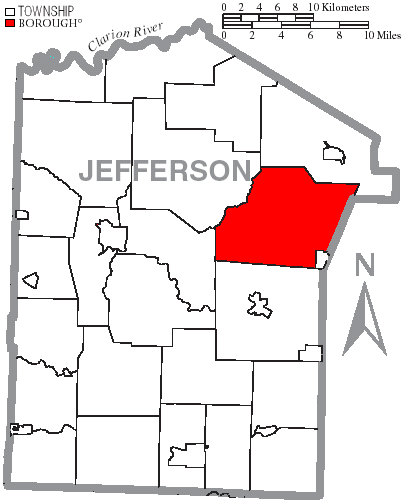
- Map of Jefferson County, Pennsylvania Highlighting Washington Township

- Map of Jefferson County, Pennsylvania
- Country: United States
- State: Pennsylvania
- County: Jefferson
- Settled: 1824
- Incorporated: 1839

Government
  - Type: A township of the second class, having a board of three supervisors.

Area
  - Total: 47.97 sq mi (124.24 km^{2})
  - Land: 47.59 sq mi (123.26 km^{2})
  - Water: 0.38 sq mi (0.98 km^{2})

Population (2020)
  - Total: 1,893 ▼
  - Estimate (2023): 1,856
  - Density: 39.78/sq mi (15.36/km^{2})
- Time zone: UTC-5 (Eastern (EST))
  - Summer (DST): UTC-4 (EDT)
- FIPS code: 42-065-81264
- Website: www.washingtonjefferson.org

Washington Township is a township in Jefferson County, Pennsylvania, United States. The population was 1,893 at the 2020 census. It was named for President George Washington.

== Geography ==
The township is in eastern Jefferson County, bordered to the east by Clearfield County and to the southeast by the borough of Falls Creek. Interstate 80 crosses the southern part of the township, with access from Exit 90 (Sensor Road). Unincorporated communities in the township include Rockdale, Beechwoods, Westville, Coal Glen, Pardus, Beechtree, McMinns Summit, Smith Summit, Red Mill, Smithtown, Harveys Run, and Hormtown.

According to the United States Census Bureau, Washington Township has a total area of 48.0 square miles (124.2 km^{2}), of which 47.6 square miles (123.3 km^{2}) are land and 0.39 square miles (1.0 km^{2}), or 0.79%, are water. Most of the township drains southeastward to Sandy Lick Creek, a tributary of Redbank Creek. Mill Creek, a separate tributary of Sandy Lick Creek, forms the northwestern border of the township. The entire township is part of the Allegheny River watershed.

== Demographics ==
Historical population
Census	Pop.	Note	%±
1850	646		—
1860	1,079		67.0%
1870	1,124		4.2%
1880	1,282		14.1%
1890	2,643		106.2%
1900	3,816		44.4%
1910	2,813		−26.3%
1920	2,352		−16.4%
1930	1,520		−35.4%
1940	1,857		22.2%
1950	1,708		−8.0%
1960	1,590		−6.9%
1970	1,548		−2.6%
1980	1,943		25.5%
1990	1,939		−0.2%
2000	1,931		−0.4%
2010	1,926		−0.3%
2020	1,893		−1.7%
2023 (est.)	1,856		−2.0%
U.S. Decennial Census

As of the census of 2000, there were 1,931 people, 742 households, and 567 families residing in the township. The population density was 40.6 inhabitants per square mile (15.7/km^{2}). There were 823 housing units at an average density of 17.3 units per square mile (6.7 units/km^{2}). The racial makeup of the township was 98.71% White, 0.31% African American, 0.10% Asian, 0.05% Pacific Islander, and 0.83% from two or more races. Hispanic or Latino of any race were 0.47% of the population.

There were 742 households, out of which 31.7% had children under the age of 18 living with them, 68.5% were married couples living together, 5.4% had a female householder with no husband present, and 23.5% were non-families. 19.9% of all households were made up of individuals, and 8.8% had someone living alone who was 65 years of age or older. The average household size was 2.57 and the average family size was 2.96.

In the township the population was spread out, with 22.3% under the age of 18, 8.0% from 18 to 24, 28.0% from 25 to 44, 26.8% from 45 to 64, and 15.0% who were 65 years of age or older. The median age was 41 years. For every 100 females, there were 102.8 males. For every 100 females age 18 and over, there were 100.7 males.

The median income for a household in the township was $36,734, and the median income for a family was $40,227. Males had a median income of $29,352 versus $22,589 for females. The per capita income for the township was $16,333. About 6.0% of families and 9.7% of the population were below the poverty line, including 17.1% of those under age 18 and 12.7% of those age 65 or over.

== Transportation ==
DuBois Regional Airport is located in the township.

== Economy ==
When it existed, Crown Airways (Allegheny Commuter) was located in the township.
