= Winslow Township, Pennsylvania =

Township in Pennsylvania, US

Coordinates: 41°07′36″N 78°51′59″W

- Township
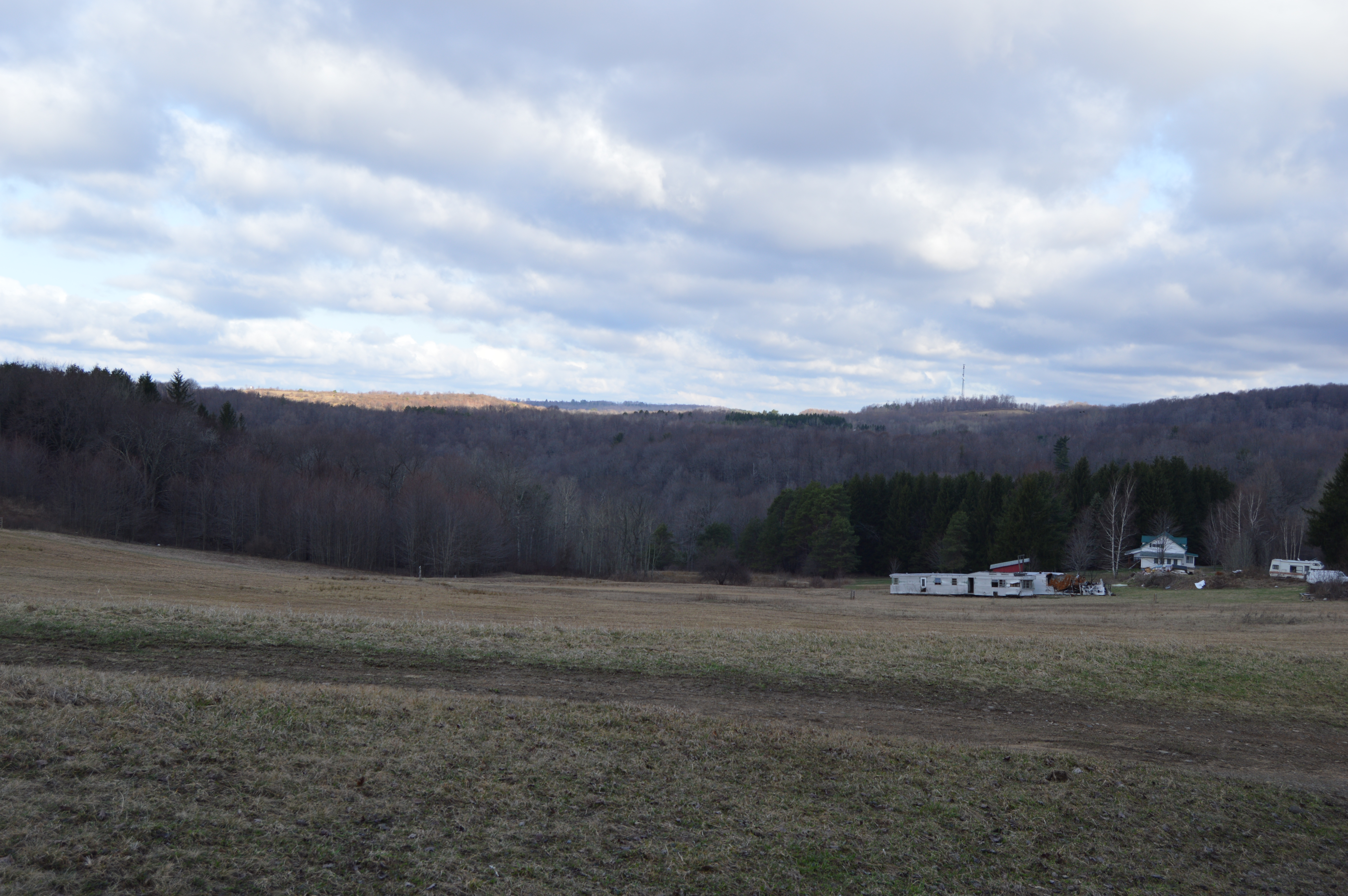
- Fields northwest of Reynoldsville

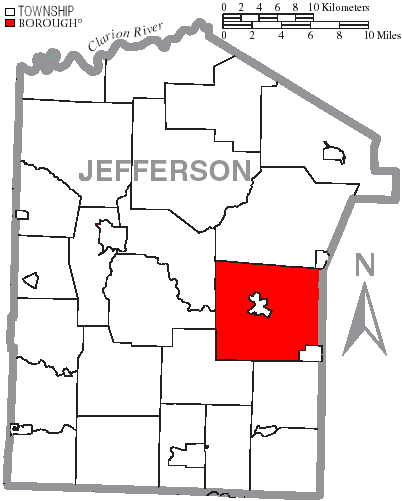
- Map of Jefferson County, Pennsylvania Highlighting Winslow Township

- Map of Jefferson County, Pennsylvania
- Country: United States
- State: Pennsylvania
- County: Jefferson
- Settled: 1822
- Incorporated: 1847

Government
  - Type: Township of the second class, having a board of three supervisors

Area
  - Total: 45.31 sq mi (117.35 km^{2})
  - Land: 45.05 sq mi (116.67 km^{2})
  - Water: 0.26 sq mi (0.68 km^{2})

Population (2020)
  - Total: 2,548 ▼
  - Estimate (2023): 2,496
  - Density: 56.56/sq mi (21.84/km^{2})
- Time zone: UTC-5 (Eastern (EST))
  - Summer (DST): UTC-4 (EDT)
- FIPS code: 42-065-85840

Winslow Township is a township in Jefferson County, Pennsylvania, United States. The population was 2,548 at the 2020 census. It was named for Associate Judge James Winslow.

== Geography ==
The township is in eastern Jefferson County and surrounds the borough of Reynoldsville. It is bordered to the southeast by the borough of Sykesville and to the northeast by the borough of Falls Creek. The eastern border of the township is the Clearfield County line. Unincorporated communities in the township include Rathmel, Sandy Valley, Prescottville, Soldier, Wishaw, Pancoast, O'Donnell, and Deemers Crossroads.

U.S. Route 322 crosses the township from east to west, passing through Reynoldsville, and U.S. Route 119 crosses the southeastern corner of the township before entering Sykesville.

According to the United States Census Bureau, the township has a total area of 45.3 square miles (117.4 km^{2}), of which 45.1 square miles (116.7 km^{2}) are land and 0.3 square miles (0.7 km^{2}), or 0.58%, are water. Sandy Lick Creek, a tributary of Redbank Creek, crosses the township from east to west, passing through Reynoldsville. The entire township lies within the Allegheny River watershed.

== Demographics ==
Historical population
Census	Pop.	Note	%±
1850	507		—
1860	1,096		116.2%
1870	1,320		20.4%
1880	1,904		44.2%
1890	3,493		83.5%
1900	6,435		84.2%
1910	4,918		−23.6%
1920	3,559		−27.6%
1930	2,472		−30.5%
1940	2,549		3.1%
1950	2,206		−13.5%
1960	2,142		−2.9%
1970	1,996		−6.8%
1980	2,586		29.6%
1990	2,526		−2.3%
2000	2,591		2.6%
2010	2,622		1.2%
2020	2,548		−2.8%
2023 (est.)	2,496		−2.0%
U.S. Decennial Census

As of the census of 2000, there were 2,591 people, 996 households, and 771 families residing in the township. The population density was 57.0 inhabitants per square mile (22.0/km^{2}). There were 1,114 housing units at an average density of 24.5/sq mi (9.5/km^{2}). The racial makeup of the township was 99.46% White, 0.08% African American, 0.15% Native American, 0.19% Asian, 0.04% from other races, and 0.08% from two or more races. Hispanic or Latino of any race were 0.58% of the population.

There were 996 households, out of which 31.4% had children under the age of 18 living with them, 66.5% were married couples living together, 7.0% had a female householder with no husband present, and 22.5% were non-families. 19.7% of all households were made up of individuals, and 9.1% had someone living alone who was 65 years of age or older. The average household size was 2.60 and the average family size was 2.97.

In the township the population was spread out, with 23.7% under the age of 18, 6.4% from 18 to 24, 29.0% from 25 to 44, 26.2% from 45 to 64, and 14.7% who were 65 years of age or older. The median age was 39 years. For every 100 females there were 102.3 males. For every 100 females age 18 and over, there were 102.9 males.

The median income for a household in the township was $34,976, and the median income for a family was $40,104. Males had a median income of $30,525 versus $22,589 for females. The per capita income for the township was $17,189. About 5.3% of families and 7.4% of the population were below the poverty line, including 10.3% of those under age 18 and 9.9% of those age 65 or over.
