= Brookville Area School District =

School district in Pennsylvania

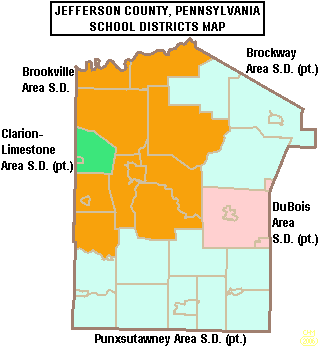

Address
- 104 Jenks Street Brookville, Pennsylvania, 15825; United States

Students and staff
- District mascot: Raiders
- Colors: Navy Blue and White

Other information
- Website: http://www.basd.us/

The Brookville Area School District is a small, rural public school district which encompasses approximately 262 square miles (680 km^{2}). The District serves the Boroughs of Brookville and Summerville and Barnett Township, Beaver Township, Clover Township, Eldred Township, Heath Township, Knox Township, Pine Creek Township, Rose Township and Warsaw Township in Jefferson County, Pennsylvania. According to 2000 federal census data, it serves a resident population of 12,485. In 2009, Brookville Area School District residents’ per capita income was $16,945, while the median family income was $38,465. In the Commonwealth, the median family income was $38,438 and the United States median family income was $49,445, in 2010.

The Brookville Area School District operates Brookville Area Jr./Sr. High School (7th-12th), Hickory Grove Elementary School (3rd-6th), Pinecreek Elementary School (1st-2nd), and Northside Elementary School (K).

The district is part of the Riverview Intermediate Unit 6 region. The intermediate unit provides support services and therapy to special education students. It also provides training to school personnel. The district is governed by a locally elected, nine member school board who serve a four-year term, the Pennsylvania General Assembly and the Pennsylvania Department of Education.

== Extracurriculars ==
The district offers a wide variety of clubs, activities and interscholastic sports.

=== Sports ===
The District funds:

Boys

- Baseball - AA
- Basketball- AA
- Cross Country - A
- Football - A
- Golf - AA
- Soccer - A
- Swimming and Diving - AA
- Track and Field - AA
- Wrestling - AA

Girls

- Basketball - AA
- Cross Country - A
- Golf - A
- Soccer (Fall) - A
- Softball - AA
- Swimming and Diving - AA
- Track and Field - AA
- Volleyball - AA

Junior High School Sports

Boys

- Basketball
- Cross Country
- Football
- Swimming and Diving
- Wrestling
- Soccer

Girls

- Basketball
- Cross Country
- Swimming and Diving

According to PIAA directory July 2012
