= Stanton, Pennsylvania =

Stanton, Pennsylvania may refer to:

- Stanton, Philadelphia
- Stanton, Jefferson County, Pennsylvania
- Stanton, Pennsylvania: the fictional city in the 2010 film Unstoppable (2010 film)
- Stanton, Pennsylvania: the fictional city in the 2018 television series Rise

== See also ==
- New Stanton, Pennsylvania
