= Markton =

Markton may refer to:

- Markton, Pennsylvania, an unincorporated community in Jefferson County
- Markton, Wisconsin, an unincorporated community in Langlade County
