= Bowersville =

Bowersville may refer to three places in the United States:

- Bowersville, Georgia
- Bowersville, Ohio
- Bowersville, Pennsylvania
- Bowersville, Virginia
