= North Fork Creek =

River in Jefferson County, Pennsylvania, United States

Coordinates: 41.31530°N 78.90277°W

North Fork Creek is a tributary of Redbank Creek in northwest Pennsylvania in the United States. It is formed by the confluence of Muddy Run and Williams Run in Polk Township, Jefferson County.

North Fork Creek and Sandy Lick Creek join to form Redbank Creek in the borough of Brookville, Jefferson County.

== Political subdivisions ==
The political subdivisions North Fork Creek traverses, given in the order they are encountered traveling downstream, are as follows:

- Polk Township
- Warsaw Township
- Eldred Township
- Pine Creek Township
- Rose Township
- Brookville

== Tributaries ==
The named tributaries of North Fork Creek, given in the order they are encountered traveling downstream, are as follows:

- Williams Run
- Muddy Run
- Bearpen Run
- Manners Dam Run
- Hetrick Run
- Lucas Run
- South Branch North Fork Redbank Creek
- Acy Run
- Seneca Run
- Windfall Run
- Clear Run
- Tarkiln Run
- Shippen Run
- Craft Run
- Burns Run
- Red Lick Run
- Yeomans Run
- Sugarcamp Run
- Sugar Camp Run
- Brookville Reservoir
- Brookville Waterworks Dam

== See also ==
- Tributaries of the Allegheny River
- List of rivers of Pennsylvania
- List of tributaries of the Allegheny River
