= Brookville Area Jr./Sr. High School =

Brookville Jr./Sr. High School

Location
- 96 Jenks St. Brookville, Jefferson, Pennsylvania 15825; United States
- Coordinates: 41.17248°N 79.08583°W

Information
- School type: Public Middle and High School
- School district: Brookville Area
- Superintendent: Erich May
- Principal: Ruthanne Barbazzeni
- Teaching staff: 50.49 (FTE)
- Grades: 7 - 12
- Gender: Co-Ed
- Age: 12 to 19
- Student to teacher ratio: 11.43
- Colors: Navy blue and white
- Song: Alma Mater
- Athletics conference: PIAA District IX
- Mascot: Blue Raiders
- Newspaper: The Beam

Brookville Jr./Sr. High School is a public school, serving Grades 7–12, in Jefferson County, Pennsylvania. The school is home to 763 students and 62 Staff.

== Alma Mater ==
We hail thee, Brookville High
Now and in future years;

We sing our many praises to
The school each one reveres.

For ever we'll be loyal
To colors blue and white;

And cherish fond memories
Of our Raider's valiant fight.

We hail you Alma Mater;
And when youth has passed us by.

Even then with fleeting breath;
We praise old Brookville High.

== Athletics ==
=== Senior High Athletics ===
Sport	Boys	Girls
Baseball / Softball	Class AA	Class AA
Basketball	Class AA	Class AA
Cross country	Class AA	Class AA
Football	Class AA	
Golf	Class AAAA	Class AAAA
Soccer	Class A	Class A
Swimming and Diving	Class AA	Class AA
Track and Field	Class AA	Class AA
Volleyball		Class A
Wrestling	Class A	Example

=== Junior High Athletics ===
Boys	Girls
Basketball; Cross Country; Football; Wrestling	Basketball; Cross Country
