= Polk Township, Pennsylvania =

Polk Township is the name of some places in the U.S. state of Pennsylvania:

- Polk Township, Jefferson County, Pennsylvania
- Polk Township, Monroe County, Pennsylvania
