= Shiffner =

Shiffner is a surname. Notable persons with the surname include:

- George Shiffner (1762–1842), British politician
- Matthew Shiffner (c. 1690–1756), Russian-born merchant of German Baltic origins

== See also ==
- Shiffner baronets
- Shoffner
