= Alaska, Pennsylvania =

Alaska may refer to either of two places in the U.S. state of Pennsylvania:

- Alaska, Jefferson County, Pennsylvania
- Alaska, Northumberland County, Pennsylvania
