= Lanes Mills, Pennsylvania =

Unincorporated community in Pennsylvania, U.S.

Coordinates: 41°13′12″N 78°46′33″W

Lanes Mills is an unincorporated community in Jefferson County, Pennsylvania, United States.

== History ==
A post office was established at Lanes Mills in 1885, and remained in operation until 1942. Fred A. Lane was the second postmaster.
