= Warsaw, Pennsylvania =

Unincorporated community in Pennsylvania, U.S.

Coordinates: 41.2000°N 78.9497°W

Warsaw is an unincorporated community within Warsaw Township in Jefferson County, in the U.S. state of Pennsylvania.

== History ==
A post office was established at Warsaw in 1836, and remained in operation until 1913.
