= Sprankle Mills, Pennsylvania =

Unincorporated community in Pennsylvania, U.S.

Coordinates: 41°00′07″N 79°06′49″W

Sprankle Mills is a small unincorporated rural community in Jefferson County, Pennsylvania, United States. It is located between the boroughs of Punxsutawney and Brookville.

== History ==
Sprankle Mills was founded in 1833 by Frederick Sprankle, who owned a mill in the middle of town. A post office was established at Sprankle Mills in 1857, and remained in operation until 1984.
