= Laura Temple =

American educator (1865–1949)

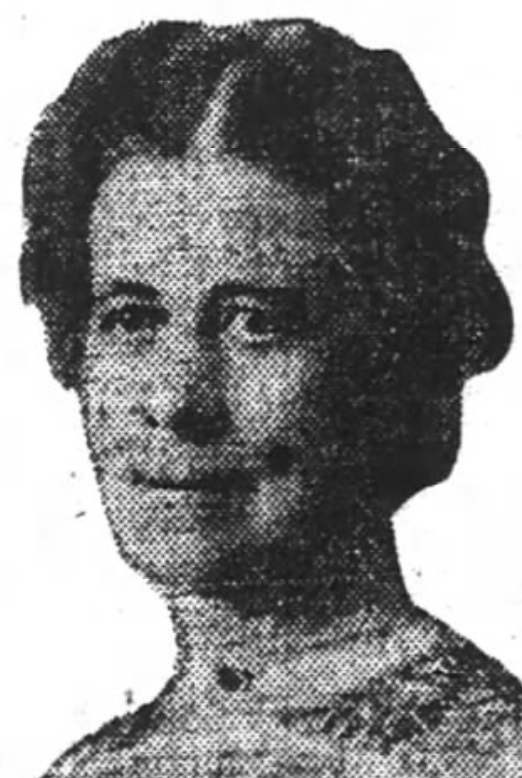
- Laura Temple, from a 1914 newspaper
- Born: August 3, 1865; Jefferson County, Pennsylvania
- Died: June 23, 1949 (aged 83); Mexico
- Occupation: Missionary educator

Annie Laura Temple (August 3, 1865 – June 23, 1949) was an American teaching missionary, based in Mexico.

== Early life ==
Temple was born in Jefferson County, Pennsylvania, the daughter of Samuel Wylie Temple and Annie J. Smith Temple. She trained as a teacher at the State Normal School in Edinboro, and attended Allegheny College, where she earned a bachelor's degree in 1893 and a master's degree. She earned a second master's degree in archaeology at the University of California.

== Career ==
Temple was a school teacher in Pennsylvania as a young woman. She went to work in Mexico under the auspices of the Woman's Foreign Missionary Society of the Methodist Episcopal Church. She was appointed principal of Hijas de Juarez school in Mexico City in 1903. She was founder and director of the Sara L. Keen Methodist College in Mexico City, which offered commercial and teacher-training courses. She was president of the Mexican Education Society. In 1912, Temple was in the United States to attend missionary conferences in Baltimore and elsewhere.

Temple was the only American missionary who did not evacuate the city in 1914, during the Mexican Revolution. "If I were in the United States, I would volunteer to come here for Red Cross service. Now that I am here, why should I go away when there is an opportunity for serving?" She successfully protected her school from violence and damage.

In 1915, she spoke at a missionary conference in Pennsylvania, and the Woman's Foreign Missionary Society meeting in San Francisco, and attended the Panama–Pacific International Exposition in San Francisco. In 1916, she was a delegate to the Congress on Christian Work in Latin America, held in Panama. After the Revolution, she founded and ran Granja, a farm school for orphaned boys, in Chapultepec.

Temple was involved in archaeological projects in Mexico, and considered an expert on Mexican codices. In 1923, in her fifties, she was part of a project led by Byron Cummings, studying ancient Navajo pueblos in Northern Arizona.

== Personal life and legacy ==
Temple died at her home in Mexico in 1949, aged 83 years. One of the schools she founded was renamed the Laura Temple School. Allegheny College had a Laura Temple Scholarship Fund.
