= Clear Creek State Park =

State park in Pennsylvania, United States

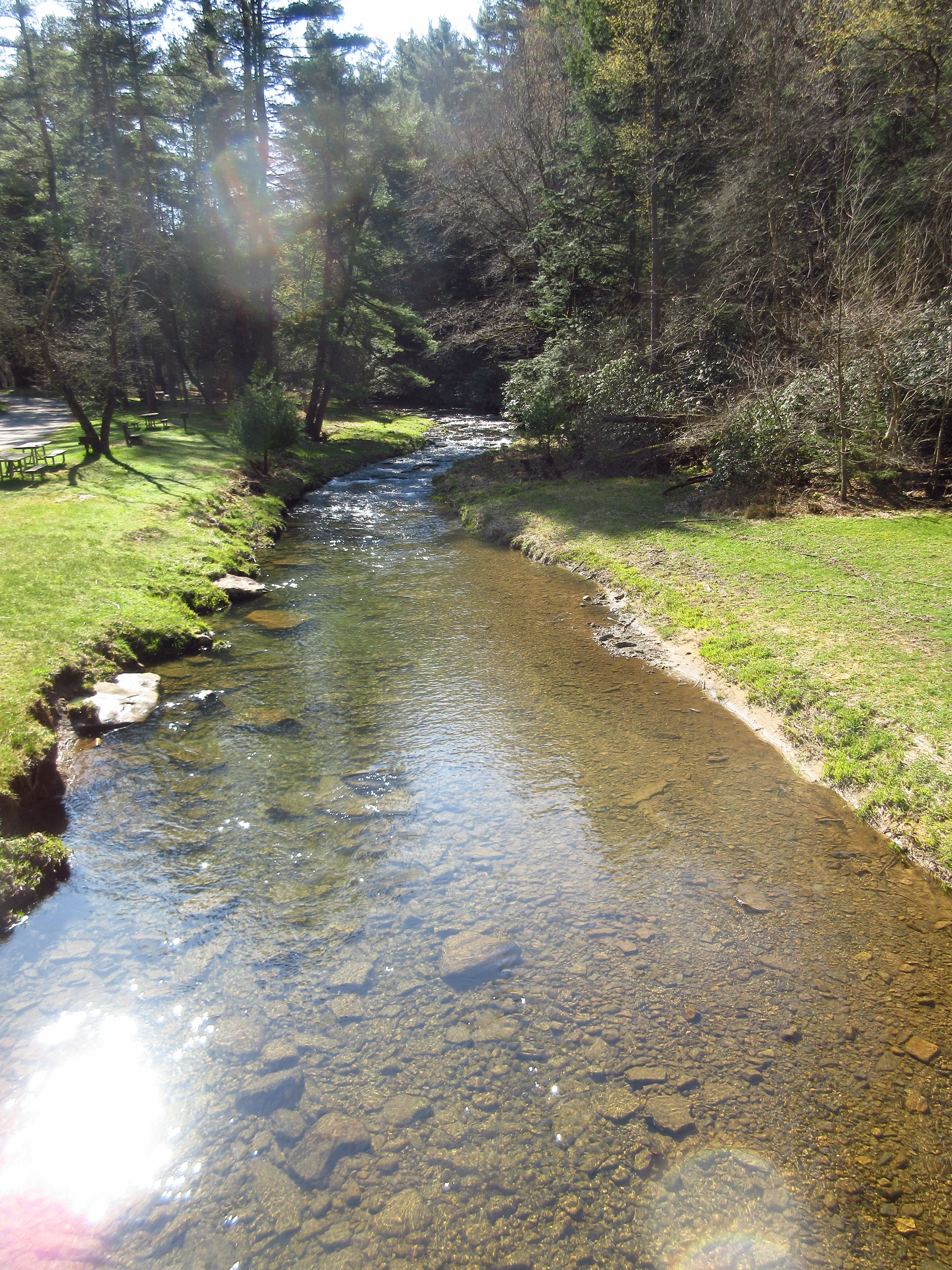
- View of the eponymous stream from a hiking trail bridge

- Location within Pennsylvania Location within the United States
- Interactive map of Clear Creek State Park
- Location: Jefferson County, Pennsylvania, United States
- Coordinates: 41°19′23″N 79°04′36″W
- Area: 1,901 acres (769 ha)
- Elevation: 1,302 ft (397 m)
- Established: 1922
- Administrator: Pennsylvania Department of Conservation and Natural Resources
- Website: Official website
- Pennsylvania State Parks

Clear Creek State Park is a 1,901-acre (769 ha) Pennsylvania state park in Barnett and Heath Townships, Jefferson County, Pennsylvania in the United States. Public campsites were first opened at the park in 1922. Many of the facilities seen today at the park were constructed during the Great Depression by the Civilian Conservation Corps. Clear Creek State Park is 12 miles (19 km) from Brookville on Pennsylvania Route 949 at the confluence of Clear Creek and the Clarion River.

The Clear Creek State Park Day Use District and Clear Creek State Park Family Cabin District were listed on the National Register of Historic Places in 1987.

== Recreation ==
Clear Creek State Park is open to many recreational opportunities. There are 25 miles (40 km) of hiking trails that run through the park and into Clear Creek State Forest. One such trail leads to Bear Town Rocks, a group of large boulders in the middle of the forest, from the top of which one can get a scenic view of the surrounding area. The park has extensive picnic facilities and is open to hunting and fishing and serves as a launch point for canoeing on the Clarion River.

About 1,200 acres (490 ha) of Clear Creek State Park are open to hunting. Hunters may park at the park to gain access to the surrounding Kitanning State Forest. Common game species are white-tailed deer, black bear, turkey, and squirrels. The hunting of groundhogs is prohibited. All hunters are expected to follow the rules and regulations of the Pennsylvania Game Commission.

Clear Creek has a native and stocked population of brook trout. The Clarion River also has some trout, panfish and smallmouth bass. Some of the small tributaries of Clear Creek and the Clarion River are also stocked with trout by the Pennsylvania Fish and Boat Commission.

The Clarion River is a popular destination for canoeing enthusiasts. They commonly launch their canoes at Clear Creek State Park for the 4 and a half hour trip (10 miles (16 km)) to Cook Forest State Park. Canoes are available to rent from various outfitters in the area.

== Accommodations ==
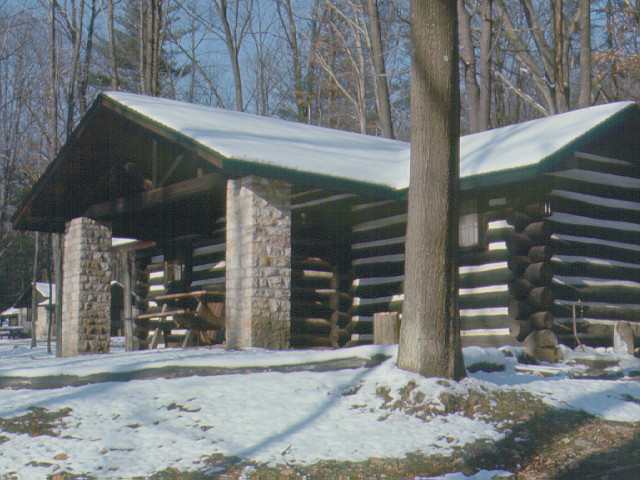
Cabin of CCC construction.

Cabins and Mongolian style yurts are available for rent to visitors interested in spending more than a day at Clear Creek State Park. Twenty-two rustic cabins built by the Civilian Conservation Corps can be rented on a weekly basis beginning with the opening of trout season in April and ending at the conclusion of deer season in December. The cabins are heated with either a wood stove or a propane heater. The two yurts have electric heat. Both the cabins and yurts have minimal accommodations. Single bunk beds, tables, chairs, an electric range, refrigerator and lights are provided. There is a centrally located shower area with frost free water spigots for drinking water.

The campground opens and closes with the cabins and yurts. Fifty-three trailer and tent sites are available for use. The rustic campground is located in the woods with outhouses and a sanitary dump station. There is a 9-hole disc golf course and a concrete basketball court next to the campground.
