= Sugar Hill, Pennsylvania =

Unincorporated community in Pennsylvania, U.S.

Coordinates: 41°14′35″N 78°52′40″W

Sugar Hill is an unincorporated community in Snyder Township, Jefferson County, in the U.S. state of Pennsylvania.

== History ==
A post office was established at Sugar Hill in 1877, and remained in operation until 1908.
