= Jefferson County, Pennsylvania =

County in Pennsylvania, United States

- County
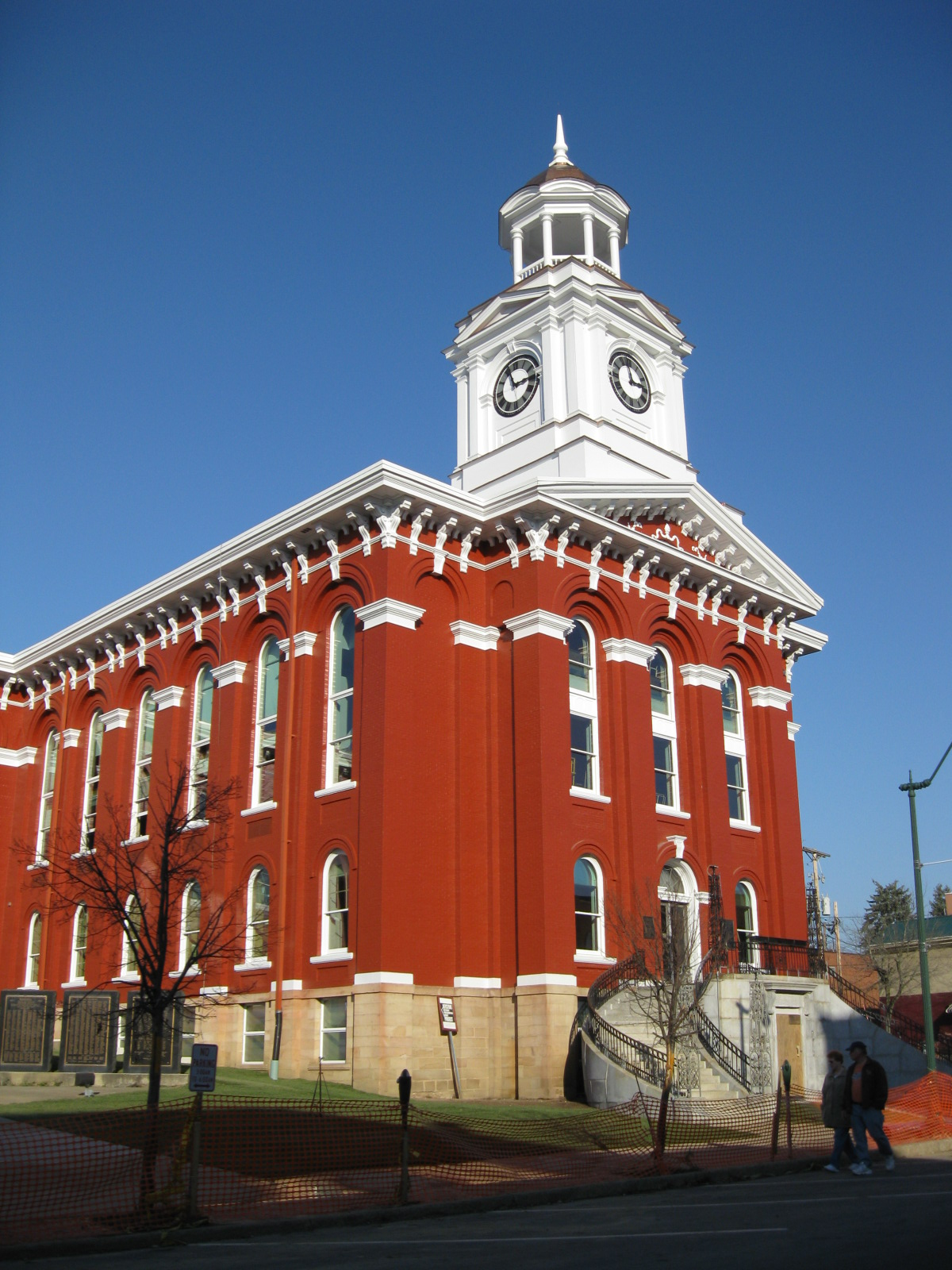
- Jefferson County Courthouse

- Flag Seal

- Location within the U.S. state of Pennsylvania
- Coordinates: 41°08′N 79°00′W
- Country: United States
- State: Pennsylvania
- Founded: October 1, 1830
- Named for: Thomas Jefferson
- Seat: Brookville
- Largest borough: Punxsutawney

Area
  - Total: 657 sq mi (1,700 km^{2})
  - Land: 652 sq mi (1,690 km^{2})
  - Water: 4.4 sq mi (11 km^{2}) 0.7%

Population (2020)
  - Total: 44,492
  - Estimate (2025): 43,255 ▼
  - Density: 66.3/sq mi (25.6/km^{2})
- Time zone: UTC−5 (Eastern)
  - Summer (DST): UTC−4 (EDT)
- Congressional district: 15th
- Website: www.jeffersoncountypa.gov

Jefferson County is a county in the Commonwealth of Pennsylvania. As of the 2020 census, the population was 44,492. Its county seat is Brookville. The county was established on March 26, 1804, from part of Lycoming County and later organized in 1830. It is named after President Thomas Jefferson. It is home to Punxsutawney Phil, the most famous groundhog that predicts when spring will come every February 2 on Groundhog Day. The county is part of the North Central region of the commonwealth. (Note: Includes Clearfield, Jefferson, Tioga, McKean, Warren, Clarion, Elk, Potter, Forest and Cameron Counties)

== Geography ==
According to the U.S. Census Bureau, the county has a total area of 657 square miles (1,700 km^{2}), of which 652 square miles (1,690 km^{2}) is land and 4.4 square miles (11 km^{2}) (0.7%) is water. It has a warm-summer humid continental climate (Dfb) and average monthly temperatures in Brookville range from 24.8 °F in January to 68.8 °F in July, while in Punxsutawney they range from 25.7 °F in January to 69.6 °F in July. Jefferson County is one of the 423 counties served by the Appalachian Regional Commission, and it is identified as part of the "Midlands" by Colin Woodard in his book American Nations: A History of the Eleven Rival Regional Cultures of North America.

=== Adjacent counties ===
- Forest County (northwest)
- Elk County (northeast)
- Clearfield County (east)
- Indiana County (south)
- Armstrong County (southwest)
- Clarion County (west)

=== Major highways ===
- I-80
- US 119
- US 219
- US 322
- PA 28
- PA 36
- PA 310
- PA 410
- PA 536
- PA 830
- PA 899
- PA 949
- PA 950

=== Streams ===
There are many named streams flowing through Jefferson County, far too many to list here. An exhaustive list is presented in a separate article. All those streams eventually flow to the Allegheny River except for Bear Run, 1.36 square miles (3.5 km^{2}), in the southeast which flows into the Susquehanna River. The principal streams and the area of their watersheds that lie within the county are:

- Clarion River: 130.50 square miles (338.0 km^{2})
  - Little Toby Creek: 34.46 square miles (89.3 km^{2})
  - Clear Creek: 20.12 square miles (52.1 km^{2})
  - Cathers Run: 15.69 square miles (40.6 km^{2})
  - Mill Creek: 30.70 square miles (79.5 km^{2})
- Redbank Creek: 375.52 square miles (972.6 km^{2})
  - North Fork Creek: 91.63 square miles (237.3 km^{2})
    - Clear Run: 9.79 square miles (25.4 km^{2})
    - Pekin Run: 10.12 square miles (26.2 km^{2})
  - Sandy Lick Creek: 143.98 square miles (372.9 km^{2})
    - Wolf Run: 18.19 square miles (47.1 km^{2})
    - Soldier Run: 11.09 square miles (28.7 km^{2})
    - Trout Run: 10.74 square miles (27.8 km^{2})
    - Mill Creek: 53.69 square miles (139.1 km^{2})
    - Fivemile Run: 17.55 square miles (45.5 km^{2})
    - Falls Creek: 11.39 square miles (29.5 km^{2})
  - Little Sandy Creek: 70.65 square miles (183.0 km^{2})
- Mahoning Creek: 149.63 square miles (387.5 km^{2})
  - East Branch Mahoning Creek: 15.27 square miles (39.5 km^{2})
  - Stump Creek: 14.86 square miles (38.5 km^{2})
  - Big Run: 19.41 square miles (50.3 km^{2})
  - Canoe Creek: 11.57 square miles (30.0 km^{2})
  - Elk Run: 13.20 square miles (34.2 km^{2})
  - Pine Run: 18.88 square miles (48.9 km^{2})

== Demographics ==
Historical population
Census	Pop.	Note	%±
1810	161		—
1820	561		248.4%
1830	2,025		261.0%
1840	7,253		258.2%
1850	13,518		86.4%
1860	18,270		35.2%
1870	21,656		18.5%
1880	27,935		29.0%
1890	44,005		57.5%
1900	59,113		34.3%
1910	63,090		6.7%
1920	62,104		−1.6%
1930	52,114		−16.1%
1940	54,090		3.8%
1950	49,147		−9.1%
1960	46,792		−4.8%
1970	43,695		−6.6%
1980	48,303		10.5%
1990	46,083		−4.6%
2000	45,932		−0.3%
2010	45,200		−1.6%
2020	44,492		−1.6%
2025 (est.)	43,255	▼	−2.8%

=== 2020 census ===
As of the 2020 census, the county had a population of 44,492, and the median age was 45.0 years. 20.8% of residents were under the age of 18 and 22.2% were 65 years of age or older. For every 100 females there were 99.4 males, and for every 100 females age 18 and over there were 97.1 males age 18 and over.

The racial makeup of the county was 95.5% White, 0.3% Black or African American, 0.1% American Indian and Alaska Native, 0.2% Asian, less than 0.1% Native Hawaiian and Pacific Islander, 0.3% from some other race, and 3.6% from two or more races, while Hispanic or Latino residents comprised 0.9% of the population.

26.5% of residents lived in urban areas, while 73.5% lived in rural areas.

There were 18,726 households in the county, of which 25.6% had children under the age of 18 living in them. Of all households, 49.3% were married-couple households, 19.4% were households with a male householder and no spouse or partner present, and 24.0% were households with a female householder and no spouse or partner present. About 30.6% of all households were made up of individuals and 15.0% had someone living alone who was 65 years of age or older.

There were 22,005 housing units, of which 14.9% were vacant. Among occupied housing units, 74.5% were owner-occupied and 25.5% were renter-occupied. The homeowner vacancy rate was 1.5% and the rental vacancy rate was 9.7%.

Jefferson County, Pennsylvania – Racial and ethnic composition Note: the US Census treats Hispanic/Latino as an ethnic category. This table excludes Latinos from the racial categories and assigns them to a separate category. Hispanics/Latinos may be of any race.
Race / Ethnicity (NH = Non-Hispanic)	Pop 2000	Pop 2010	Pop 2020	% 2000	% 2010	% 2020
White alone (NH)	45,320	44,264	42,317	98.66%	97.92%	95.11%
Black or African American alone (NH)	49	147	125	0.10%	0.32%	0.28%
Native American or Alaska Native alone (NH)	64	72	45	0.13%	0.15%	0.10%
Asian alone (NH)	94	91	100	0.20%	0.20%	0.22%
Pacific Islander alone (NH)	4	3	8	0.00%	0.00%	0.01%
Other race alone (NH)	15	8	92	0.03%	0.01%	0.20%
Mixed race or Multiracial (NH)	198	340	1,408	0.43%	0.75%	3.16%
Hispanic or Latino (any race)	188	275	397	0.40%	0.60%	0.89%
Total	45,932	45,200	44,492	100.00%	100.00%	100.00%

=== 2000 census ===
As of the 2000 census, there were 45,932 people, 18,375 households, and 12,862 families residing in the county. The population density was 70 people per square mile (27 people/km^{2}). There were 22,104 housing units at an average density of 34 units per square mile (13/km^{2}). The racial makeup of the county was 98.97% White, 0.13% Black or African American, 0.16% Native American, 0.21% Asian, 0.01% Pacific Islander, 0.07% from other races, and 0.45% from two or more races. 0.41% of the population were Hispanic or Latino of any race. 31.1% were of German, 13.4% Italian, 10.8% American, 9.2% Irish and 7.8% English ancestry.

There were 18,375 households, out of which 30.30% had children under the age of 18 living with them, 56.80% were married couples living together, 9.10% had a female householder with no husband present, and 30.00% were non-families. 26.60% of all households were made up of individuals, and 13.80% had someone living alone who was 65 years of age or older. The average household size was 2.45 and the average family size was 2.96.

In the county, the population was spread out, with 23.60% under the age of 18, 7.70% from 18 to 24, 27.20% from 25 to 44, 23.60% from 45 to 64, and 17.90% who were 65 years of age or older. The median age was 40 years. For every 100 females there were 95.70 males. For every 100 females age 18 and over, there were 92.60 males.

== Law and government ==
Jefferson County is strongly favored the Republican Party, which has won the vote of all but two presidential elections.

United States presidential election results for Jefferson County, Pennsylvania
Year	Republican		Democratic		Third party(ies)	
Year	No.	%	No.	%	No.	%
1888	4,090	53.48%	3,257	42.59%	301	3.94%
1892	4,100	50.41%	3,251	39.97%	782	9.62%
1896	5,500	57.18%	3,671	38.16%	448	4.66%
1900	5,950	62.38%	3,063	32.11%	525	5.50%
1904	5,860	69.09%	2,095	24.70%	527	6.21%
1908	5,652	60.17%	2,986	31.79%	755	8.04%
1912	1,608	18.65%	2,510	29.11%	4,504	52.24%
1916	4,332	51.74%	3,253	38.85%	788	9.41%
1920	7,970	66.69%	3,060	25.61%	920	7.70%
1924	10,673	64.88%	2,664	16.19%	3,113	18.92%
1928	13,233	74.63%	4,325	24.39%	173	0.98%
1932	8,246	52.48%	6,570	41.81%	897	5.71%
1936	11,943	51.24%	11,080	47.54%	283	1.21%
1940	12,081	58.40%	8,559	41.37%	47	0.23%
1944	10,970	62.52%	6,425	36.62%	152	0.87%
1948	9,395	61.43%	5,632	36.82%	268	1.75%
1952	11,833	64.61%	6,365	34.75%	116	0.63%
1956	13,051	66.26%	6,627	33.64%	19	0.10%
1960	13,845	63.82%	7,811	36.01%	38	0.18%
1964	8,373	43.47%	10,851	56.34%	37	0.19%
1968	10,214	55.67%	6,839	37.28%	1,294	7.05%
1972	11,631	68.92%	5,024	29.77%	221	1.31%
1976	9,437	55.09%	7,456	43.53%	237	1.38%
1980	9,628	57.38%	6,296	37.53%	854	5.09%
1984	11,334	65.31%	5,950	34.28%	71	0.41%
1988	9,743	60.48%	6,235	38.71%	131	0.81%
1992	7,271	41.05%	5,998	33.87%	4,442	25.08%
1996	8,156	49.56%	5,846	35.52%	2,455	14.92%
2000	11,473	65.24%	5,566	31.65%	547	3.11%
2004	13,371	68.36%	6,073	31.05%	116	0.59%
2008	12,057	63.75%	6,447	34.09%	408	2.16%
2012	13,048	71.78%	4,787	26.33%	343	1.89%
2016	15,192	77.53%	3,650	18.63%	753	3.84%
2020	17,964	78.54%	4,529	19.80%	379	1.66%
2024	18,235	78.66%	4,707	20.30%	241	1.04%

United States Senate election results for Jefferson County, Pennsylvania1
Year	Republican		Democratic		Third party(ies)	
Year	No.	%	No.	%	No.	%
1994	8,077	59.76%	4,616	34.15%	823	6.09%
2000	11,370	65.79%	5,361	31.02%	552	3.19%
2006	7,731	54.62%	6,424	45.38%	0	0.00%
2012	12,780	70.66%	4,878	26.97%	428	2.37%
2018	10,872	69.80%	4,437	28.49%	267	1.71%
2024	17,618	76.34%	4,834	20.95%	626	2.71%

United States Senate election results for Jefferson County, Pennsylvania3
Year	Republican		Democratic		Third party(ies)	
Year	No.	%	No.	%	No.	%
1992	8,923	50.57%	7,107	40.28%	1,616	9.16%
1998	7,161	64.25%	3,433	30.80%	551	4.94%
2004	11,865	61.83%	5,254	27.38%	2,070	10.79%
2010	9,326	70.61%	3,882	29.39%	0	0.00%
2016	13,706	70.95%	4,160	21.54%	1,451	7.51%
2022	13,139	73.87%	4,135	23.25%	512	2.88%

Pennsylvania Gubernatorial election results for Jefferson County
Year	Republican		Democratic		Third party(ies)	
Year	No.	%	No.	%	No.	%
1970	7,564	50.14%	7,192	47.67%	331	2.19%
1974	8,320	57.06%	6,145	42.15%	115	0.79%
1978	6,896	48.38%	7,289	51.14%	69	0.48%
1982	7,435	54.88%	6,037	44.56%	76	0.56%
1986	7,171	50.36%	6,947	48.79%	122	0.86%
1990	3,918	32.56%	8,117	67.44%	0	0.00%
1994	7,151	52.93%	4,063	30.07%	2,297	17.00%
1998	6,493	58.08%	2,473	22.12%	2,213	19.80%
2002	8,745	67.67%	3,879	30.02%	299	2.31%
2006	8,774	61.89%	5,402	38.11%	0	0.00%
2010	10,017	74.55%	3,420	25.45%	0	0.00%
2014	7,458	63.03%	4,375	36.97%	0	0.00%
2018	11,036	69.40%	4,277	26.90%	588	3.70%
2022	12,433	69.77%	5,038	28.27%	349	1.96%

=== Voter registration ===
As of July 22, 2024, there are 27,731 registered voters in Jefferson County.

Chart of Voter Registration
1. Republican (67.9%)
2. Democratic (20.9%)
3. Independent (7.56%)
4. Third Party (3.64%)
- Republican: 18,817 (67.86%)
- Democratic: 5,809 (20.94%)
- Independent: 2,096 (7.56%)
- Third Party: 1,009 (3.64%)

=== County Commissioners ===
- Mark Humes(R)
- Scott E. North(R)
- Jeffrey E. Pisarcik(D)

=== State Senate ===
- Cris Dush, District 25
- Joe Pittman, District 41

=== State House of Representatives ===
- Brian Smith, Republican, Pennsylvania's 66th Representative District

=== United States House of Representatives ===
- G.T. Thompson, Republican, Pennsylvania's 15th congressional district

=== United States Senate ===
- David McCormick, Republican
- John Fetterman, Democratic

== Education ==
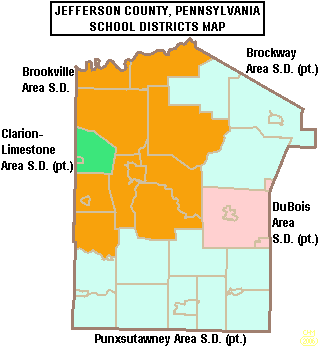
Map of Jefferson County, Pennsylvania Public School Districts

=== Colleges and universities ===
- Indiana University of Pennsylvania
- Clarion University of Pennsylvania
- Butler County Community College (Brockway)

=== Public school districts ===
- Brockway Area School District
- Brookville Area School District
- Clarion-Limestone Area School District
- DuBois Area School District
- Punxsutawney Area School District

=== Related public entities ===
- Jefferson County-DuBois AVTS
- Riverview Intermediate Unit #6

=== Private schools ===
- Allens Mills School - Reynoldsville
- Bear Lane School - Punxsutawney
- Blose Hill Amish School - Reynoldsville
- Bucks Run - Reynoldsville
- Canoe Ridge Amish School - Rossiter
- Christ Dominion Academy
- Colonial Drake - Punxsutawney
- Eagles Nest Amish School - Brockway
- Highland Park - Punxsutawney
- Hillside School - Punxsutawney
- Lone Maple School - Punxsutawney
- Maple Grove School - Reynoldsville
- Mountain View School - Punxsutawney
- Munderf Amish School - Brockway
- Oak Grove Parochial School - Smicksburg
- Pine Valley Parochial School - Punxsutawney
- Playhouse Children's Center - Punxsutawney
- Praise Christian Academy - Reynoldsville
- Punxsutawney Christian Sch - Ele Level - Punxsutawney
- Spring Hollow Amish School - Reynoldsville
- Spring Run School - Smickburg
- Sts Cosmas & Damian School - Punxsutawney
- Trout Run School - Punxsutawney
- Valley View School - Punxsutawney
- West Creek Road Amish School - Punxsutawney
- Willow Drive School - Punxsutawney
- Windy Hollow Amish School - Mayport

=== Libraries ===
- Jefferson County Library System - Brockway
- Mengle Memorial Library - Brockway
- Punxsutawney Memorial Library - Punxsutawney
- Rebecca M Arthurs Memorial Library - Brookville
- Reynoldsville Public Library - Reynoldsville
- Summerville Public Library - Summerville
- Sykesville Public Library - Sykesville

=== Licensed entities ===
- Full Circle Inc Boys Home - Reynolds
- Jefferson County Adult Detention Center
- Western Pennsylvania School of Taxidermy - Oliveburg

== Recreation ==
Two Pennsylvania state parks are in the county.

- Clear Creek State Park is in Barnett and Heath Townships.
- Cook Forest State Park is in Barnett Township and stretches into neighboring Clarion and Forest Counties

The Jefferson County Fair is held annually in July.

== Communities ==
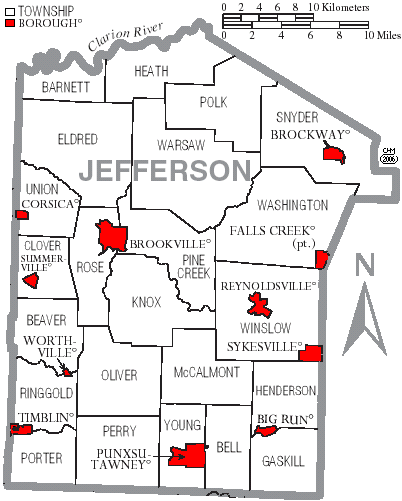
Map of Jefferson County, Pennsylvania with Municipal Labels showing Boroughs (red) and Townships (white).

Under Pennsylvania law, there are four types of incorporated municipalities: cities, boroughs, townships, and, in at most two cases, towns. The following boroughs and townships are located in Jefferson County:

=== Boroughs ===
- Big Run
- Brockway
- Brookville (county seat)
- Corsica
- Falls Creek
- Punxsutawney
- Reynoldsville
- Summerville
- Sykesville
- Timblin
- Worthville

=== Townships ===
- Barnett
- Beaver
- Bell
- Clover
- Eldred
- Gaskill
- Heath
- Henderson
- Knox
- McCalmont
- Oliver
- Perry
- Pine Creek
- Polk
- Porter
- Ringgold
- Rose
- Snyder
- Union
- Warsaw
- Washington
- Winslow
- Young

=== Census-designated place ===
- Crenshaw
- University of Pittsburgh (Bradford)

=== Unincorporated communities ===
- Adrian Mines
- Alaska
- Allens Mills
- Anita
- Baxter
- Beechtree
- Beechwoods
- Bells Mills
- Blowtown
- Bowersville
- Cloe
- Coal Glen
- Conifer
- Content
- Coolspring
- Cortez
- Desire
- Dora
- East Branch
- Ella
- Emerickville
- Fordham
- Forestville
- Frostburg
- Fuller
- Hamilton
- Hazen
- Heathville
- Horatio
- Howe
- Kahletown
- Knox Dale
- Lanes Mills
- Langville
- Markton
- McMinns Summit
- Munderf
- North Freedom
- Ohl
- Oliveburg
- Panic
- Pancoast
- Pansy
- Pardus
- Port Barnett
- Porter
- Prescottville
- Ramsaytown
- Rathmel
- Richardsville
- Ringgold
- Rockdale
- Roseville
- Sandy Valley
- Schoffner Corner
- Sigel
- Soldier
- Sprankle Mills
- Stanton
- Stump Creek
- Sugar Hill
- Valier
- Walston
- Warsaw
- Westville
- Winslow
- Wishaw

=== Population ranking ===
The population ranking of the following table is based on the 2010 census of Jefferson County.

† county seat

Rank	City/Town/etc.	Municipal type	Population (2020 Census)
1	Punxsutawney	Borough	5,769
2	† Brookville	Borough	3,995
3	Reynoldsville	Borough	2,549
4	Brockway	Borough	2,276
5	Sykesville	Borough	1,115
6	Falls Creek (partially in Clearfield County)	Borough	994
7	Big Run	Borough	647
8	Summerville	Borough	504
9	Crenshaw	CDP	468
10	Corsica	Borough	319
11	Timblin	Borough	147
12	Worthville	Borough	80

== Notable people ==
- John T. Morrison, sixth governor of Idaho from 1903 until 1905; born in Jefferson County.
- Sparky Lyle, professional baseball player
- Chuck Daly, American basketball head coach
- George Jenks, politician
- Florence Parry Heide, author
- Wilbur Good, professional baseball player
- Andy Hastings, professional football player
- Mal Eason, professional baseball player
- John Mizerock, professional baseball player
- Devin Mesoraco, professional baseball player
- Jim Pittsley, professional baseball player
- Britt Baker, professional wrestler and dentist
- Laura Temple, missionary teacher and archaeologist in Mexico

== See also ==
- National Register of Historic Places listings in Jefferson County, Pennsylvania
- Oil Creek Library District
