= Lake Sabula =

Dam in Sandy Township, Pennsylvania, U.S.

- Interactive map of Lake Sabula
- Location: Sandy Township, Pennsylvania
- Coordinates: 41°09′28″N 78°39′58″W

Dam and spillways
- Impounds: Sandy Lick Creek

Reservoir
- Normal elevation: 1,460 feet (450 m)

Lake Sabula is a reservoir located in Sandy Township, Clearfield County, Pennsylvania, United States just below the source of Sandy Lick Creek.
