= Union Township, Jefferson County, Pennsylvania =

Township in Pennsylvania, US

Coordinates: 41°11′09″N 79°09′50″W

- Township
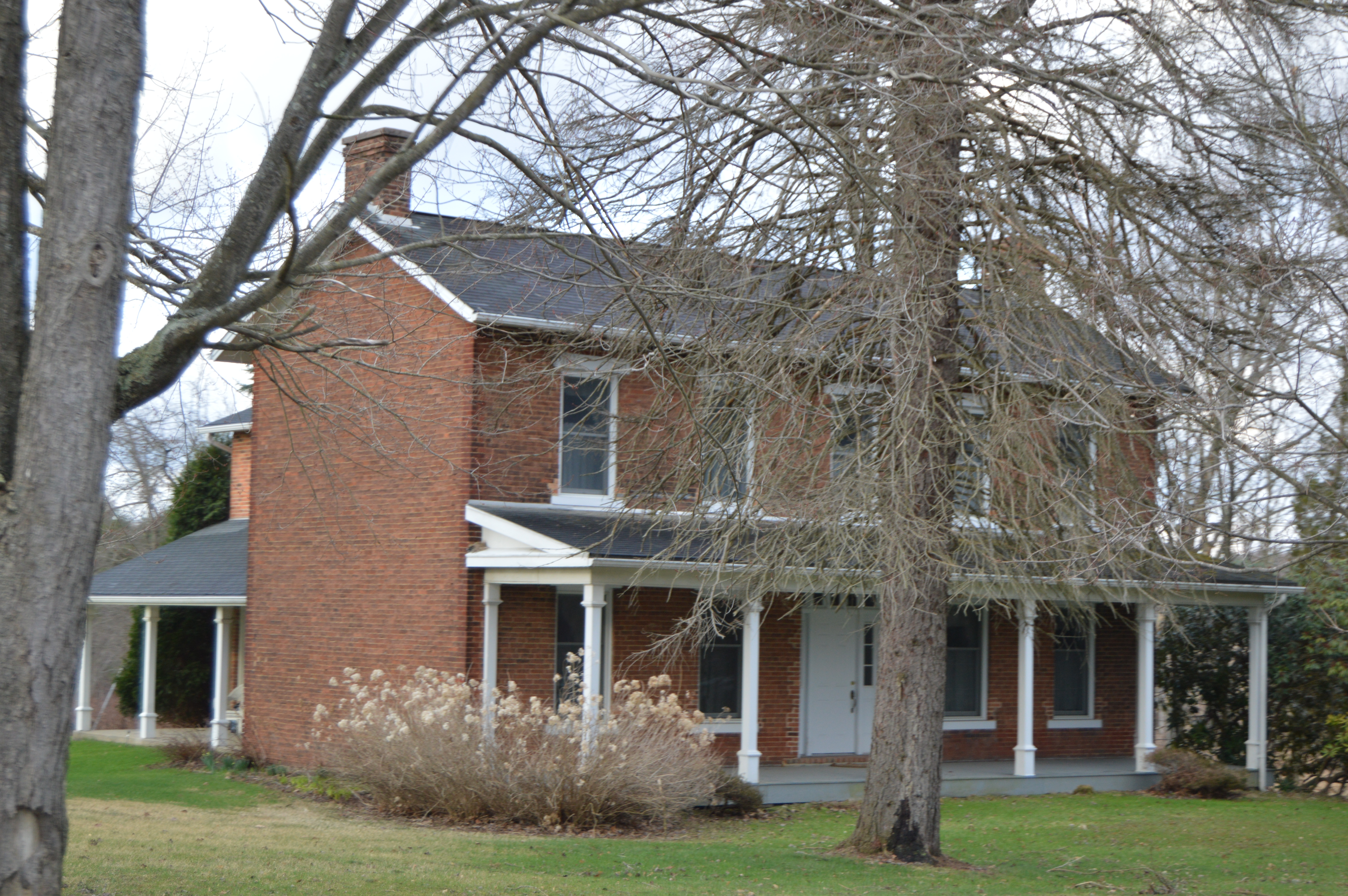
- Farmhouse on U.S. Route 322 east of Corsica

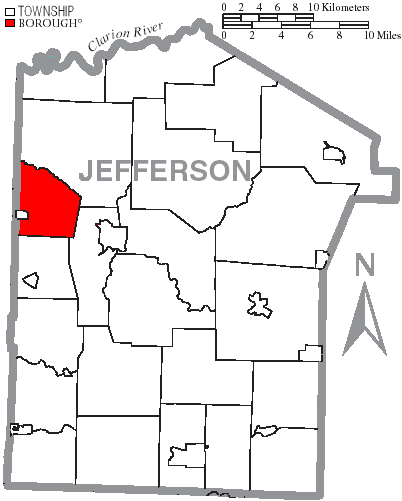
- Map of Jefferson County, Pennsylvania Highlighting Union Township

- Map of Jefferson County, Pennsylvania
- Country: United States
- State: Pennsylvania
- County: Jefferson
- Settled: 1802
- Incorporated: 1849

Government
  - Type: A Township of the Second Class, having a three member board of Supervisors

Area
  - Total: 17.65 sq mi (45.72 km^{2})
  - Land: 17.64 sq mi (45.68 km^{2})
  - Water: 0.015 sq mi (0.04 km^{2})

Population (2020)
  - Total: 849 ▼
  - Estimate (2023): 833
  - Density: 48.1/sq mi (18.6/km^{2})
- Time zone: UTC-5 (Eastern (EST))
  - Summer (DST): UTC-4 (EDT)
- FIPS code: 42-065-78336

Union Township is a township in Jefferson County, Pennsylvania, United States. The population was 849 at the 2020 census. The name was derived from the term applied to the country of the United States.

== Geography ==
The township is in northwestern Jefferson County and is bordered to the west by Clarion County. The borough of Corsica, a separate municipality, lies along the county line and is bordered to the north, east, and south by Union Township. Roseville is an unincorporated community in the eastern part of the township.

Interstate 80 crosses Union Township, with access from Exit 73 just north of Corsica. U.S. Route 322 runs south of and parallel to I-80, passing through Corsica and Roseville.

According to the United States Census Bureau, the township has a total area of 17.6 square miles (45.7 km^{2}), of which 0.02 square miles (0.04 km^{2}), or 0.08%, are water. The township is bordered to the north by Mill Creek, a westward-flowing tributary of the Clarion River. The entire township is located in the Allegheny River watershed.

== Demographics ==
Historical population
Census	Pop.	Note	%±
1850	597		—
1860	532		−10.9%
1870	595		11.8%
1880	809		36.0%
1890	803		−0.7%
1900	732		−8.8%
1910	531		−27.5%
1920	511		−3.8%
1930	575		12.5%
1940	579		0.7%
1950	611		5.5%
1960	554		−9.3%
1970	621		12.1%
1980	721		16.1%
1990	733		1.7%
2000	816		11.3%
2010	855		4.8%
2020	849		−0.7%
2023 (est.)	833		−1.9%
U.S. Decennial Census

As of the census of 2000, there were 816 people, 323 households, and 249 families residing in the township. The population density was 45.9 inhabitants per square mile (17.7/km^{2}). There were 401 housing units at an average density of 22.6/sq mi (8.7/km^{2}). The racial makeup of the township was 99.75% White, and 0.25% from two or more races. Hispanic or Latino of any race were 0.37% of the population.

There were 323 households, out of which 30.3% had children under the age of 18 living with them, 65.9% were married couples living together, 6.2% had a female householder with no husband present, and 22.9% were non-families. 20.7% of all households were made up of individuals, and 9.3% had someone living alone who was 65 years of age or older. The average household size was 2.53 and the average family size was 2.90.

In the township, the population was spread out, with 22.1% under the age of 18, 8.2% from 18 to 24, 26.7% from 25 to 44, 26.0% from 45 to 64, and 17.0% who were 65 years of age or older. The median age was 41 years. For every 100 females, there were 102.5 males. For every 100 females age 18 and over, there were 102.5 males.

The median income for a household in the township was $34,559, and the median income for a family was $38,828. Males had a median income of $29,318 versus $18,625 for females. The per capita income for the township was $15,528. About 4.6% of families and 7.2% of the population were below the poverty line, including 10.9% of those under age 18 and 6.2% of those age 65 or over.
