= Shoffner =

Shoffner is a surname. Notable people with the surname include:

- Bob Shoffner (1900–83), American jazz trumpeter
- Hallie Shoffner (born 1987 or 1988), American farmer, business executive and politician
- John Shoffner (born 1955), American racing driver, investor and pilot
- Martha Shoffner (born 1944 or 1945), American politician in Arkansas
- Milt Shoffner (1905–78), American Major League Baseball pitcher
- Wilson Allen Shoffner (1938–2014), lieutenant general in the U.S. Army

== See also ==
- Schoffner Corner, Pennsylvania
- Shoffner Act, passed in 1870 by the North Carolina General Assembly, named after State Senator T. M. Shoffner
