= Polk Township, Jefferson County, Pennsylvania =

Township in Pennsylvania, US

Coordinates: 41°19′00″N 78°52′28″W

- Township
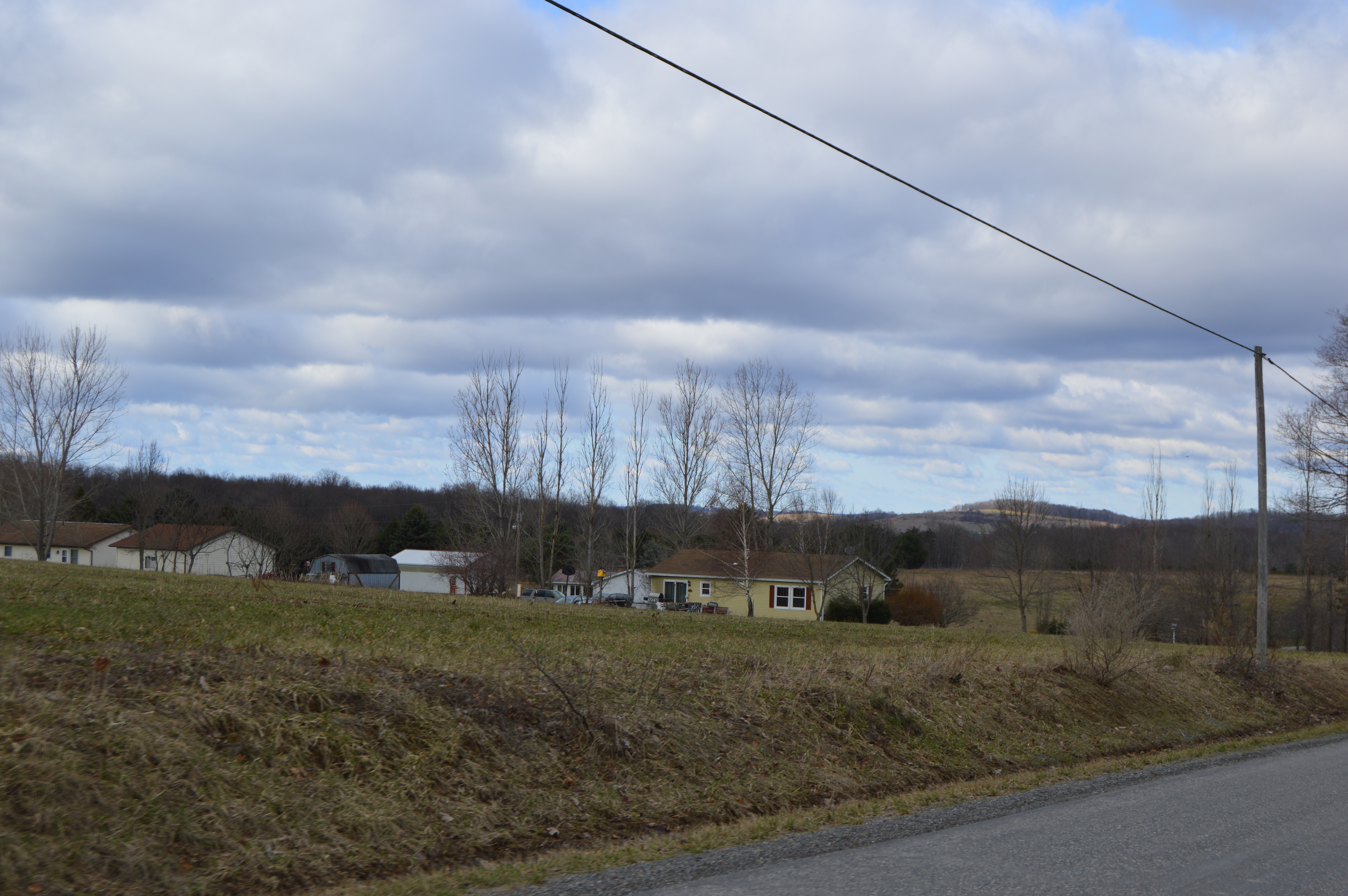
- Scene along Game School Road

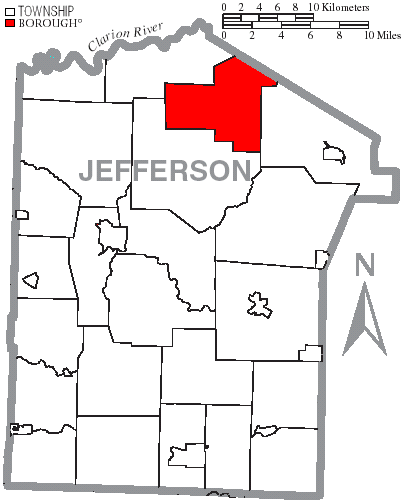
- Map of Jefferson County, Pennsylvania Highlighting Polk Township

- Map of Jefferson County, Pennsylvania
- Country: United States
- State: Pennsylvania
- County: Jefferson
- Settled: 1838
- Incorporated: 1857

Government
  - Type: Township of the Second Class, having a three-member board of supervisors

Area
  - Total: 30.47 sq mi (78.91 km^{2})
  - Land: 30.41 sq mi (78.76 km^{2})
  - Water: 0.058 sq mi (0.15 km^{2})

Population (2020)
  - Total: 287 ▲
  - Estimate (2023): 281
  - Density: 9.44/sq mi (3.64/km^{2})
- Time zone: UTC-5 (Eastern (EST))
  - Summer (DST): UTC-4 (EDT)
- FIPS code: 42-065-61920
- Website: https://www.polktwp.com/

Polk Township is a township in Jefferson County, Pennsylvania, United States. The population was 287 at the 2020 census. It was named for President James K. Polk.

== Geography ==
The township is in northern Jefferson County and is bordered to the northeast by Elk County. It includes the unincorporated communities of Green Briar, Schoffner Corner, Blowtown, Munderf, and Dixon Corner.

According to the United States Census Bureau, the township has a total area of 30.5 square miles (78.9 km^{2}), of which 0.04 square miles (0.1 km^{2}), or 0.19%, are water.

== Demographics ==
Historical population
Census	Pop.	Note	%±
1860	244		—
1870	256		4.9%
1880	361		41.0%
1890	616		70.6%
1900	653		6.0%
1910	414		−36.6%
1920	357		−13.8%
1930	290		−18.8%
1940	332		14.5%
1950	259		−22.0%
1960	226		−12.7%
1970	183		−19.0%
1980	216		18.0%
1990	305		41.2%
2000	294		−3.6%
2010	265		−9.9%
2020	287		8.3%
2023 (est.)	281		−2.1%
U.S. Decennial Census

As of the census of 2000, there were 294 people, 111 households, and 80 families residing in the township. The population density was 9.6 people per square mile (3.7/km^{2}). There were 389 housing units at an average density of 12.7/sq mi (4.9/km^{2}). The racial makeup of the township was 95.24% White, 1.70% African American, 0.34% Native American, 0.68% Asian, and 2.04% from two or more races. Hispanic or Latino of any race were 3.06% of the population.

There were 111 households, out of which 27.0% had children under the age of 18 living with them, 60.4% were married couples living together, 6.3% had a female householder with no husband present, and 27.9% were non-families. 24.3% of all households were made up of individuals, and 9.0% had someone living alone who was 65 years of age or older. The average household size was 2.65 and the average family size was 3.06.

In the township the population was spread out, with 25.5% under the age of 18, 5.1% from 18 to 24, 24.1% from 25 to 44, 27.2% from 45 to 64, and 18.0% who were 65 years of age or older. The median age was 42 years. For every 100 females there were 110.0 males. For every 100 females age 18 and over, there were 119.0 males.

The median income for a household in the township was $27,917, and the median income for a family was $33,000. Males had a median income of $30,114 versus $15,625 for females. The per capita income for the township was $13,923. About 7.3% of families and 13.1% of the population were below the poverty line, including 19.1% of those under the age of 18 and 9.8% of those 65 or over.
