= Soldier, Pennsylvania =

Unincorporated community in Pennsylvania, U.S.

Coordinates: 41°03′45″N 78°50′38″W

Soldier is an unincorporated community in Jefferson County, in the U.S. state of Pennsylvania.

== History ==
A post office was established at Soldier in 1899, and remained in operation until 1944. The community takes its name from nearby Soldier Run creek.
