= Soldier Run =

Stream in Pennsylvania, U.S.

Coordinates: 41°05′21″N 78°53′33″W

Soldier Run is a stream in the U.S. state of Pennsylvania. It is a tributary of Sandy Lick Creek.

Soldier Run took its name from nearby Big Soldier coal mine.

== See also ==
- List of rivers of Pennsylvania
