= Rockdale, Pennsylvania =

Unincorporated community in Pennsylvania, U.S.

Coordinates: 41.8076°N 79.9659°W

Rockdale is an unincorporated community in Jefferson County, in the U.S. state of Pennsylvania.

== History ==
An early sawmill was built at Rockdale in 1831.
