= Bowersville, Pennsylvania =

Unincorporated community in Pennsylvania, US

Coordinates: 40°55′22″N 78°51′51″W

Bowersville is an unincorporated community in Jefferson County, in the U.S. state of Pennsylvania.

== History ==
A post office was established at Bowersville in 1903, and remained in operation until 1929.

== Geography ==
Bowersville's elevation is 1,821 feet.
