= Munderf, Pennsylvania =

Unincorporated community in Pennsylvania, U.S.

Coordinates: 41°17′04″N 78°56′58″W

Munderf is an unincorporated community in Jefferson County, in the U.S. state of Pennsylvania.

== History ==
A post office was established at Munderf in 1885, and remained in operation until 1933. It was the last post office in Polk Township.
