= Sandy Valley, Pennsylvania =

Unincorporated community in Pennsylvania, U.S.

Coordinates: 41°07′48″N 78°53′11″W

Sandy Valley is an unincorporated community in Jefferson County, in the U.S. state of Pennsylvania.

== History ==
A post office called Sandy Valley was established in 1872, and remained in operation until 1930. The community had a depot on the Low Grade Railroad.
