= Roseville, Jefferson County, Pennsylvania =

Unincorporated community in Pennsylvania, U.S.

Coordinates: 41°10′40″N 79°08′46″W

Roseville is an unincorporated community in Jefferson County, in the U.S. state of Pennsylvania.

== History ==
The community was named for one Mr. Rose, a local landowner.
