= Pancoast, Pennsylvania =

Unincorporated community in Pennsylvania, U.S.

Coordinates: 41°07′43″N 78°49′22″W

Pancoast is an unincorporated community in Jefferson County, in the U.S. state of Pennsylvania.

== History ==
A post office was established at Pancoast in 1876, and remained in operation until 1899. The former mining community once contained the Pancoast Mine, employing at least 36 miners.
