= Rathmel, Pennsylvania =

Unincorporated community in Pennsylvania, U.S.

Coordinates: 41°05′40″N 78°50′23″W

Rathmel is an unincorporated community in Jefferson County, in the U.S. state of Pennsylvania.

== History ==
Rathmal got its start as a mining community. A post office called Rathmel was established in 1883, and remained in operation until 1930.
