= Coal Glen, Pennsylvania =

Unincorporated community in Pennsylvania, US

Coordinates: 41°12′42″N 78°51′17″W

Coal Glen is an unincorporated community in Jefferson County, in the U.S. state of Pennsylvania.

== History ==
Coal Glen was originally a mining community. A post office was established at Coal Glen in 1886, and remained in operation until 1931.
