= Westville, Pennsylvania =

Unincorporated community in Pennsylvania, U.S.

Coordinates: 41°12′50″N 78°50′12″W

Westville is an unincorporated community in Washington Township, Jefferson County, in the U.S. state of Pennsylvania.

== History ==
A post office was established at Westville in 1892, and remained in operation until 1980.

Alexander McKay settled in the area in 1882 and is credited with giving the community its name of Westville, which is the name of his native town of Westville in Pictou County, Nova Scotia, Canada.
