= Prescottville, Pennsylvania =

Unincorporated community in Pennsylvania, U.S.

Coordinates: 41°05′10″N 78°51′37″W

Prescottville is an unincorporated community in Jefferson County, in the U.S. state of Pennsylvania.

== History ==
The first settlement at Prescottville was made in 1853. A post office called Prescottville was established in 1889, and remained in operation until 1913.
