= Beechwoods, Pennsylvania =

Unincorporated community in Pennsylvania, U.S.

Coordinates: 41°11′19″N 78°51′00″W

Beechwoods is an unincorporated community in Washington Township, Jefferson County, in the U.S. state of Pennsylvania.

== History ==
The Beechwoods Baptist Church was built in the community in 1837.
