= McMinns Summit, Pennsylvania =

Unincorporated community in Pennsylvania, U.S.

Coordinates: 41°12′10″N 78°46′31″W

McMinns Summit is an unincorporated community in Jefferson County, in the U.S. state of Pennsylvania.

The community shares its name with a nearby drainage divide.
