= Warsaw Township, Pennsylvania =

Township in Pennsylvania, US

Coordinates: 41°12′00″N 78°56′59″W

- Township
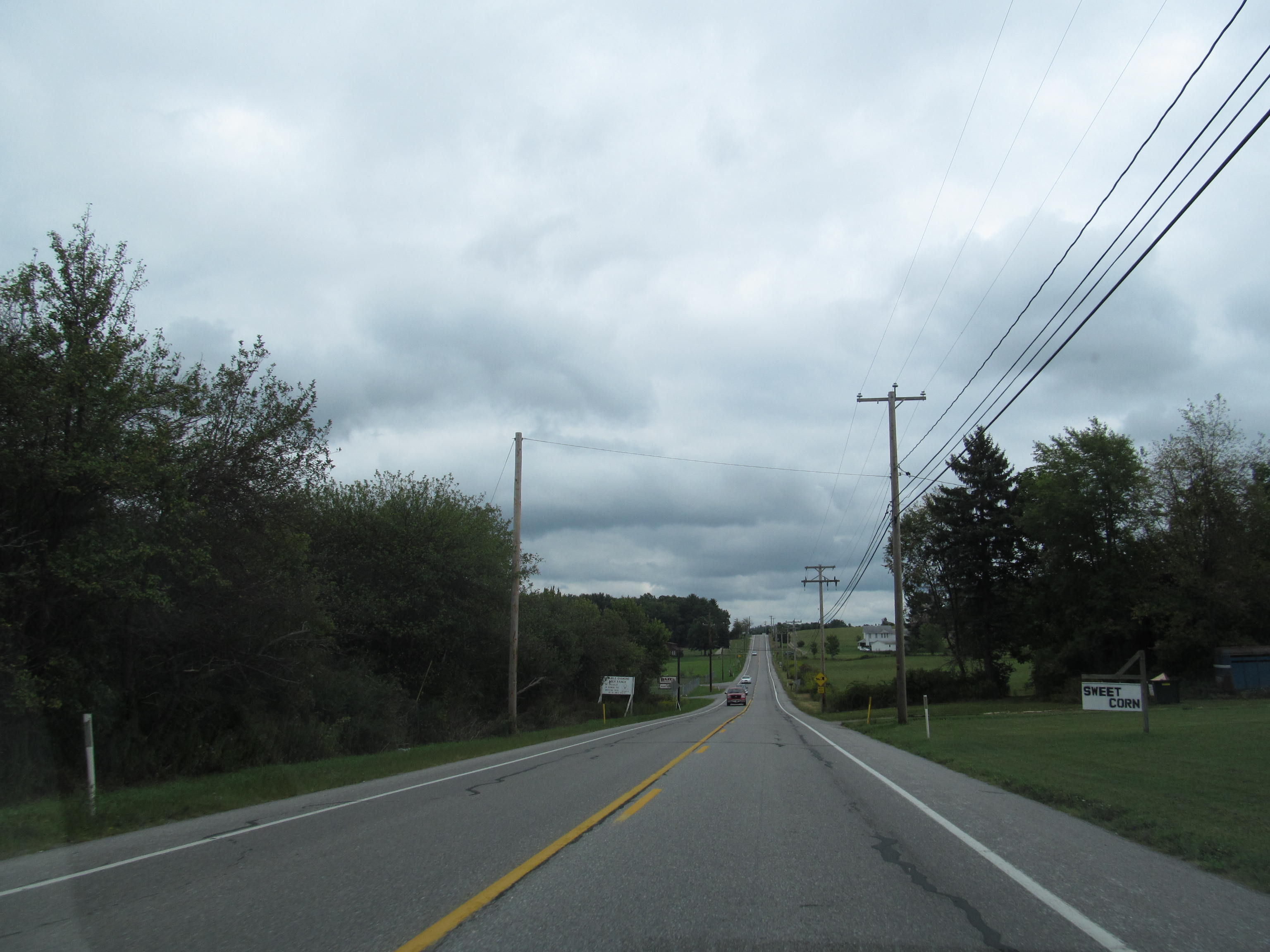
- Northbound PA 28 in Warsaw Township

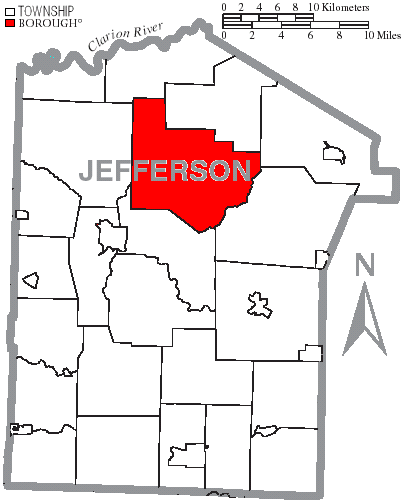
- Map of Jefferson County, Pennsylvania Highlighting Warsaw Township

- Map of Jefferson County, Pennsylvania
- Country: United States
- State: Pennsylvania
- County: Jefferson
- Settled: 1800
- Incorporated: 1842

Government
  - Type: Township of the Second Class, having a board of three supervisors

Area
  - Total: 51.50 sq mi (133.39 km^{2})
  - Land: 51.28 sq mi (132.82 km^{2})
  - Water: 0.22 sq mi (0.57 km^{2})

Population (2020)
  - Total: 1,367 ▼
  - Estimate (2023): 1,340
  - Density: 26.66/sq mi (10.29/km^{2})
- Time zone: UTC-5 (Eastern (EST))
  - Summer (DST): UTC-4 (EDT)
- FIPS code: 42-065-81120

Warsaw Township is a township in Jefferson County, Pennsylvania, United States. As of the 2020 census, the township population was 1,367.

== Geography ==
The township is in north-central Jefferson County, northeast of Brookville, the county seat, and west of Brockway. Unincorporated communities in the township include Warsaw, Hazen, Richardsville, Allens Mills, Egypt, and Reitz.

According to the United States Census Bureau, Warsaw township has a total area of 51.5 square miles (133.4 km^{2}), of which 51.3 square miles (132.8 km^{2}) are land and 0.2 square miles (0.6 km^{2}), or 0.43%, are water. It was named after Warsaw, the capital of Poland. North Fork Creek crosses the northern and western parts of the township, and Mill Creek forms the southeastern border. Both creeks are part of the Redbank Creek watershed, flowing west to the Allegheny River.

== Demographics ==
Historical population
Census	Pop.	Note	%±
1850	870		—
1860	933		7.2%
1870	1,122		20.3%
1880	1,414		26.0%
1890	1,567		10.8%
1900	1,563		−0.3%
1910	1,256		−19.6%
1920	1,082		−13.9%
1930	919		−15.1%
1940	992		7.9%
1950	911		−8.2%
1960	976		7.1%
1970	1,004		2.9%
1980	1,169		16.4%
1990	1,213		3.8%
2000	1,346		11.0%
2010	1,424		5.8%
2020	1,367		−4.0%
2023 (est.)	1,340		−2.0%
U.S. Decennial Census

As of the census of 2000, there were 1,346 people, 517 households, and 396 families residing in the township. The population density was 26.2 inhabitants per square mile (10.1/km^{2}). There were 746 housing units at an average density of 14.5/sq mi (5.6/km^{2}). The racial makeup of the township was 98.74% White, 0.67% Native American, 0.30% Asian, and 0.30% from two or more races. Hispanic or Latino of any race were 0.45% of the population.

There were 517 households, out of which 31.5% had children under the age of 18 living with them, 67.3% were married couples living together, 6.8% had a female householder with no husband present, and 23.4% were non-families. 20.7% of all households were made up of individuals, and 7.4% had someone living alone who was 65 years of age or older. The average household size was 2.60 and the average family size was 3.01.

In the township the population was spread out, with 24.7% under the age of 18, 8.0% from 18 to 24, 27.9% from 25 to 44, 25.5% from 45 to 64, and 13.9% who were 65 years of age or older. The median age was 39 years. For every 100 females, there were 105.2 males. For every 100 females age 18 and over, there were 103.4 males.

The median income for a household in the township was $32,917, and the median income for a family was $39,438. Males had a median income of $26,927 versus $18,971 for females. The per capita income for the township was $14,487. About 8.5% of families and 9.4% of the population were below the poverty line, including 8.4% of those under age 18 and 11.1% of those age 65 or over.
