= Markton, Pennsylvania =

Community in Pennsylvania, US

Coordinates: 41°00′38″N 79°03′51″W

Markton is an unincorporated community in Jefferson County, in the U.S. state of Pennsylvania.

== History ==
A post office was established at Markton in 1895, and remained in operation until 1934.
