= Richardsville, Pennsylvania =

Unincorporated community in Pennsylvania, U.S.

Coordinates: 41°14′24″N 79°00′44″W

Richardsville is an unincorporated community in Jefferson County, in the U.S. state of Pennsylvania.

== History ==
A post office was established at Richardsville in 1849, and remained in operation until 1969. By 1850, merchants were in business at Richardsville selling whisky.
