= Pardus, Pennsylvania =

Unincorporated community in Pennsylvania, U.S.

Coordinates: 41°08′45″N 78°53′13″W

Pardus is an unincorporated community in Jefferson County, in the U.S. state of Pennsylvania.

== History ==
A post office was established at Pardus in 1903, and remained in operation until 1925.
