= Beechtree, Pennsylvania =

Unincorporated community in Pennsylvania, U.S.

Coordinates: 41°12′36″N 78°49′14″W

Beechtree is an unincorporated community in Jefferson County, in the U.S. state of Pennsylvania.

== History ==
Beechtree was originally a mining community. A post office was established at Beechtree in 1882, and remained in operation until 1909.
