= Rose Township, Jefferson County, Pennsylvania =

Township in Pennsylvania, US

Coordinates: 41°07′00″N 79°06′59″W

Rose Township, Pennsylvania
- Township
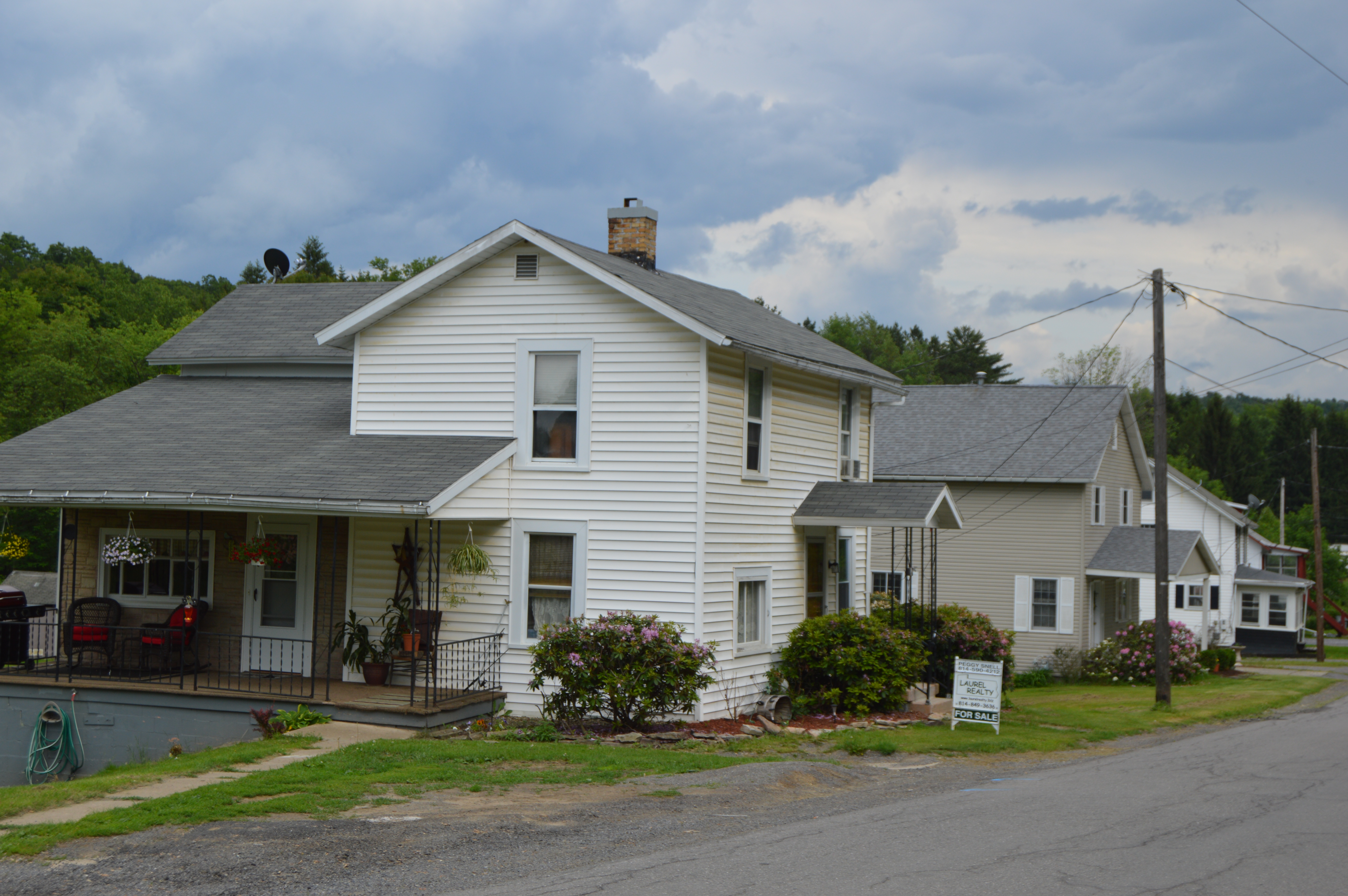
- Residential neighborhood on Belgiumtown Road, just south of Brookville

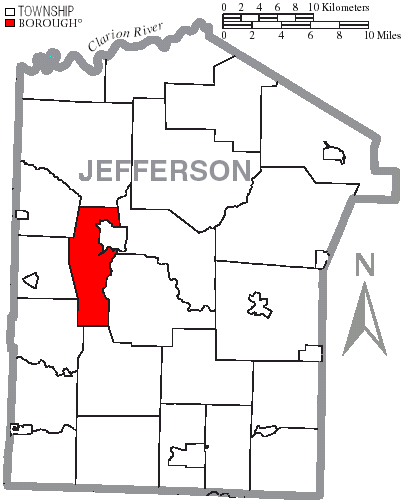
- Map of Jefferson County, Pennsylvania Highlighting Rose Township

- Map of Jefferson County, Pennsylvania
- Country: United States
- State: Pennsylvania
- County: Jefferson
- Settled: 1805
- Incorporated: 1827

Government
  - Type: Township of the Second Class, having a three-member board of supervisors

Area
  - Total: 19.23 sq mi (49.80 km^{2})
  - Land: 19.09 sq mi (49.45 km^{2})
  - Water: 0.14 sq mi (0.35 km^{2})

Population (2020)
  - Total: 1,153 ▼
  - Estimate (2023): 1,132
  - Density: 60.39/sq mi (23.32/km^{2})
- Time zone: UTC-5 (Eastern (EST))
  - Summer (DST): UTC-4 (EDT)
- FIPS code: 42-065-66032

Rose Township is a township in Jefferson County, Pennsylvania, United States. The population was 1,153 at the 2020 census. It was named for a prominent citizen named Dr. Rose.

== Geography ==
The township is in west-central Jefferson County and is bordered to the east by the borough of Brookville, the county seat. Interstate 80 crosses the northern part of the township, with access from Exit 78 (Pennsylvania Route 36) in Brookville just east of the township border. U.S. Route 322 also crosses the township, running parallel to and just south of I-80. Unincorporated communities in the township include Alaska, Stanton, McGarey, and Coder.

According to the United States Census Bureau, the township has a total area of 19.2 square miles (49.8 km^{2}), of which 19.1 square miles (49.5 km^{2}) are land and 0.1 square miles (0.3 km^{2}), or 0.70%, are water. Redbank Creek, a west-flowing tributary of the Allegheny River, crosses the center of the township, coming out of Brookville.

== Demographics ==
Historical population
Census	Pop.	Note	%±
1850	559		—
1860	909		62.6%
1870	1,006		10.7%
1880	1,601		59.1%
1890	1,830		14.3%
1900	1,805		−1.4%
1910	1,982		9.8%
1920	1,762		−11.1%
1930	1,544		−12.4%
1940	1,509		−2.3%
1950	1,404		−7.0%
1960	1,177		−16.2%
1970	975		−17.2%
1980	1,157		18.7%
1990	1,198		3.5%
2000	1,232		2.8%
2010	1,255		1.9%
2020	1,153		−8.1%
2023 (est.)	1,132		−1.8%
U.S. Decennial Census

As of the census of 2000, there were 1,232 people, 474 households, and 357 families residing in the township. The population density was 64.4 inhabitants per square mile (24.9/km^{2}). There were 529 housing units at an average density of 27.7 per square mile (10.7/km^{2}). The racial makeup of the township was 98.94% White, 0.16% African American, and 0.89% from two or more races. Hispanic or Latino of any race were 0.08% of the population.

There were 474 households, out of which 34.2% had children under the age of 18 living with them, 64.1% were married couples living together, 7.4% had a female householder with no husband present, and 24.5% were non-families. 22.4% of all households were made up of individuals, and 11.4% had someone living alone who was 65 years of age or older. The average household size was 2.60 and the average family size was 3.01.

In the township, the population was spread out, with 25.6% under the age of 18, 8.2% from 18 to 24, 29.2% from 25 to 44, 24.2% from 45 to 64, and 12.8% who were 65 years of age or older. The median age was 38 years. For every 100 females, there were 99.0 males. For every 100 females age 18 and over, there were 97.6 males.

The median income for a household in the township was $33,636, and the median income for a family was $39,236. Males had a median income of $30,664 versus $18,542 for females. The per capita income for the township was $17,472. About 6.2% of families and 7.4% of the population were below the poverty line, including 7.6% of those under age 18 and 3.1% of those age 65 or over.
