= Blowtown, Pennsylvania =

Unincorporated community in Pennsylvania, US

Coordinates: 41°17′45″N 78°56′05″W

Blowtown is an unincorporated community in Jefferson County, in the U.S. state of Pennsylvania.

== History ==
The first store in Blowtown was established in 1879.
