= Wishaw, Pennsylvania =

Unincorporated community in Pennsylvania, U.S.

Coordinates: 41°02′34″N 78°54′30″W

Wishaw is an unincorporated community in Jefferson County, in the U.S. state of Pennsylvania.

== History ==
A post office was established at Wishaw in 1889, and remained in operation until 1925.
