= Stanton, Jefferson County, Pennsylvania =

Unincorporated community in Pennsylvania, U.S.

Coordinates: 41°05′18″N 79°06′43″W

Stanton is an unincorporated community in Jefferson County, in the U.S. state of Pennsylvania.

== History ==
Stanton was originally called Belleview, and under the latter name was laid out in 1844. Stanton was the name of the post office at Belleview. A post office was established under the name Stanton in 1862, and remained in operation until 1911.
