= Alaska, Jefferson County, Pennsylvania =

Unincorporated community in Pennsylvania, US

Coordinates: 41°10′39″N 079°05′45″W

Alaska is a place in Jefferson County, Pennsylvania, United States.

== See also ==
- Brookville, Pennsylvania
