= Schoffner Corner, Pennsylvania =

Unincorporated community in Pennsylvania, U.S.

Coordinates: 41°18′35″N 78°55′40″W

Schoffner Corner is an unincorporated community in Jefferson County, in the U.S. state of Pennsylvania.

== History ==
Schoffner's Corners was the second post office of Polk Township. A post office was established as Schoffner's Corners in 1859, and remained in operation until 1913.
