= Heath Township, Jefferson County, Pennsylvania =

Township in Pennsylvania, US

Coordinates: 41°20′00″N 78°57′59″W

Heath Township, Pennsylvania
- Township
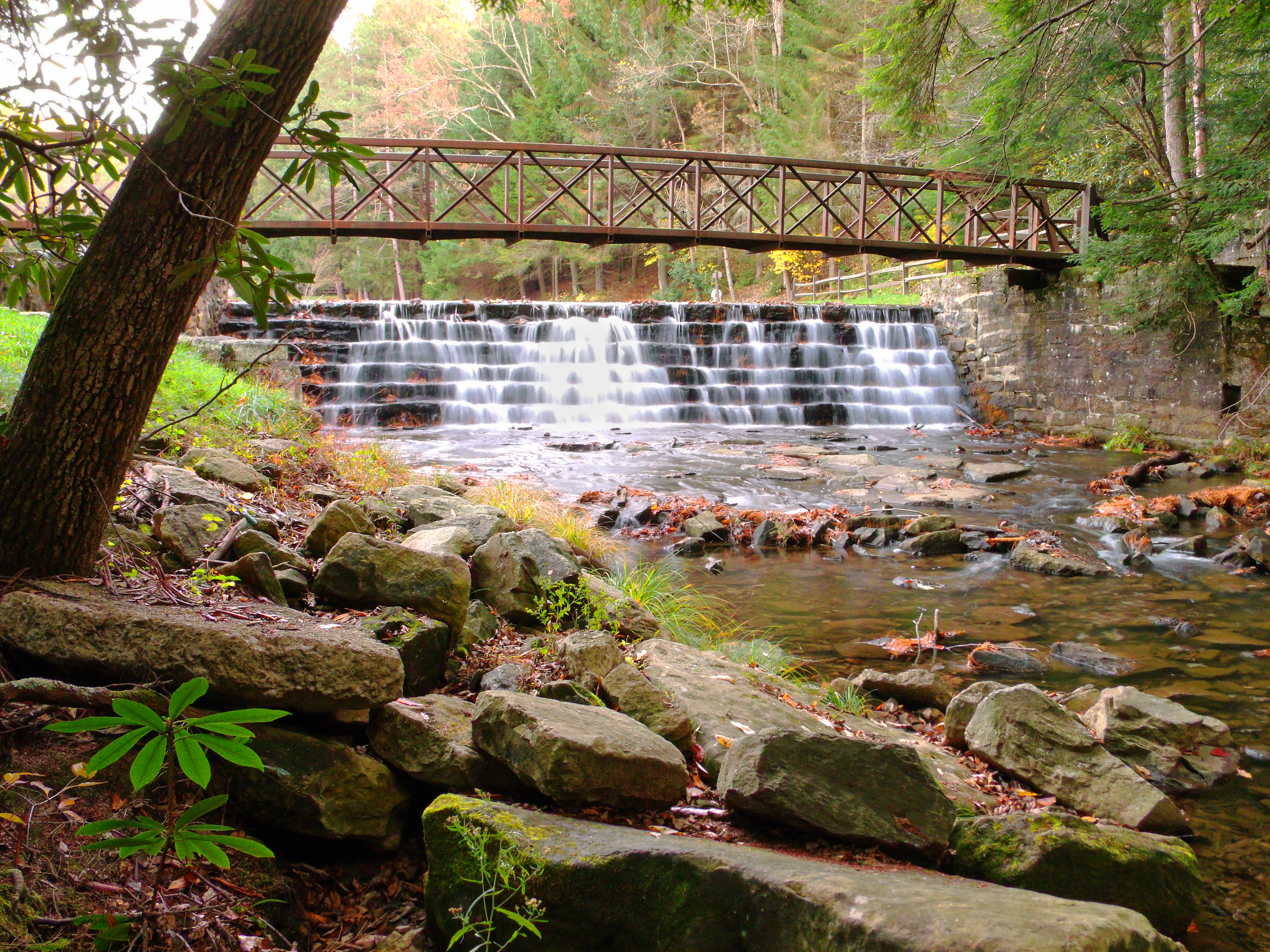
- Dam in Clear Creek State Park

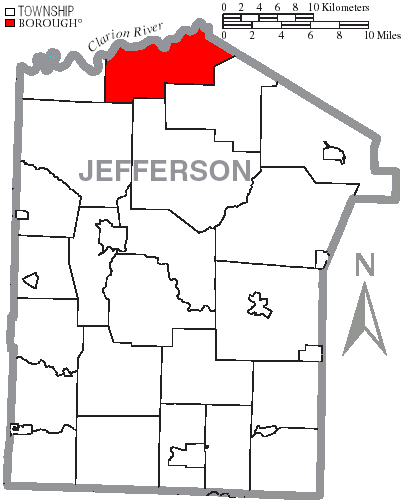
- Map of Jefferson County, Pennsylvania Highlighting Heath Township

- Map of Jefferson County, Pennsylvania
- Country: United States
- State: Pennsylvania
- County: Jefferson
- Settled: 1833
- Incorporated: 1847

Area
  - Total: 29.21 sq mi (75.66 km^{2})
  - Land: 28.85 sq mi (74.72 km^{2})
  - Water: 0.36 sq mi (0.94 km^{2})

Population (2020)
  - Total: 117 ▼
  - Estimate (2023): 115
  - Density: 4.06/sq mi (1.57/km^{2})
- Time zone: UTC-5 (Eastern (EST))
  - Summer (DST): UTC-4 (EDT)
- FIPS code: 42-065-33448
- Website: https://heathtwp.com/

Heath Township is a township in Jefferson County, Pennsylvania, United States. The population was 117 at the 2020 census, down from the figure of 124 tabulated in 2010. It was named for early Jefferson County settler Elijah Heath. Heath Township is the second-smallest municipality in Jefferson County.

== History and recreation ==
Heath Township is a popular tourist destination for avid sportsmen, with many seasonal private residences maintained by out-of-town residents, as well as a wide variety of campgrounds ranging from rustic accommodations to modern-day amenities.

The municipality is the home of Clear Creek State Park, which is operated and maintained by the Pennsylvania Department of Conservation and Natural Resources.

From 1912 to 2017, it was also the home of Heath Pump Station, a compressed natural gas producer owned by New York-based National Fuel Gas. The pump station also shared property with a dam that allowed Callen Run to flow into the Clarion River. The dam provided water to the engines running the station as well as a trout fishing hatchery built in 1955 and operated and maintained by the Heath Township Sportsmen's Association. Despite a persistent natural gas odor and pump noise, anglers were undeterred from fishing that portion of Callen Run.

Heath Pump Station stopped compressing gas in 2007, with its building being torn down a decade later. Of historical note, the pump station supplied much of northcentral Pennsylvania and western New York with natural gas using a compressor pump manufactured by Snow Steam Pump Works in Buffalo, New York. The pump weighed 98 tons and had a length of 50 feet, with its 13-foot flywheel alone weighing 11 tons. Though state of the art for its time, its use was supplanted by more modern technology capable of producing more gas more efficiently, and a smaller plant was constructed in the vicinity to replace the Heath Station. That plant is known as the Eldred Compressor Station. Relics from the Heath Station were later donated to the Jefferson County Historical Society and one of the Snow engines was donated to the Western New York Gas & Steam Engine Association.

The fish hatchery remains, and the sportsmen's association keeps a supply of approved food to allow young children visiting the hatchery an opportunity to feed the fish. The fish food is provided for free, though the association also provides an "honor box" to accept donations in order to help offset the food costs. The dam is slated to be eventually removed from the property to allow native trout to swim from the Clarion River back up to Callen Run in warmer weather.

== Geography ==
Heath Township is in northern Jefferson County, bordered to the north by Elk County. The Clarion River, a west-flowing tributary of the Allegheny River, forms the northern border of the township and the county line. The township includes the unincorporated community of Dutch Hill.

According to the United States Census Bureau, the township has a total area of 29.2 square miles (75.7 km^{2}), of which 28.8 square miles (74.7 km^{2}) are land and 0.35 square miles (0.9 km^{2}), or 1.25%, are water.

== Demographics ==
Historical population
Census	Pop.	Note	%±
1850	203		—
1860	214		5.4%
1870	247		15.4%
1880	207		−16.2%
1890	236		14.0%
1900	325		37.7%
1910	325		0.0%
1920	219		−32.6%
1930	181		−17.4%
1940	203		12.2%
1950	123		−39.4%
1960	94		−23.6%
1970	69		−26.6%
1980	138		100.0%
1990	109		−21.0%
2000	160		46.8%
2010	124		−22.5%
2020	117		−5.6%
2023 (est.)	115		−1.7%
U.S. Decennial Census

As of the census of 2000, there were 160 people, 77 households, and 49 families residing in the township. The population density was 5.6 people per square mile (2.2/km^{2}). There were 707 housing units at an average density of 24.7/sq mi (9.5/km^{2}). The racial makeup of the township was 98.12% White, 0.62% Asian, and 1.25% from two or more races. Hispanic or Latino of any race were 0.62% of the population.

There were 77 households, out of which 15.6% had children under the age of 18 living with them, 53.2% were married couples living together, 6.5% had a female householder with no husband present, and 35.1% were non-families. 35.1% of all households were made up of individuals, and 15.6% had someone living alone who was 65 years of age or older. The average household size was 2.08 and the average family size was 2.60.

In the township the population was spread out, with 14.4% under the age of 18, 5.6% from 18 to 24, 23.1% from 25 to 44, 34.4% from 45 to 64, and 22.5% who were 65 years of age or older. The median age was 53 years. For every 100 females there were 125.4 males. For every 100 females age 18 and over, there were 128.3 males.

The median income for a household in the township was $42,500, and the median income for a family was $48,750. Males had a median income of $41,250 versus $32,250 for females. The per capita income for the township was $37,309. About 14.0% of families and 14.3% of the population were below the poverty line, including 38.5% of those under the age of 18 and none of those 65 or over.
