= Sandy Lick Creek =

Coordinates: 41.15849°N 79.07722°W

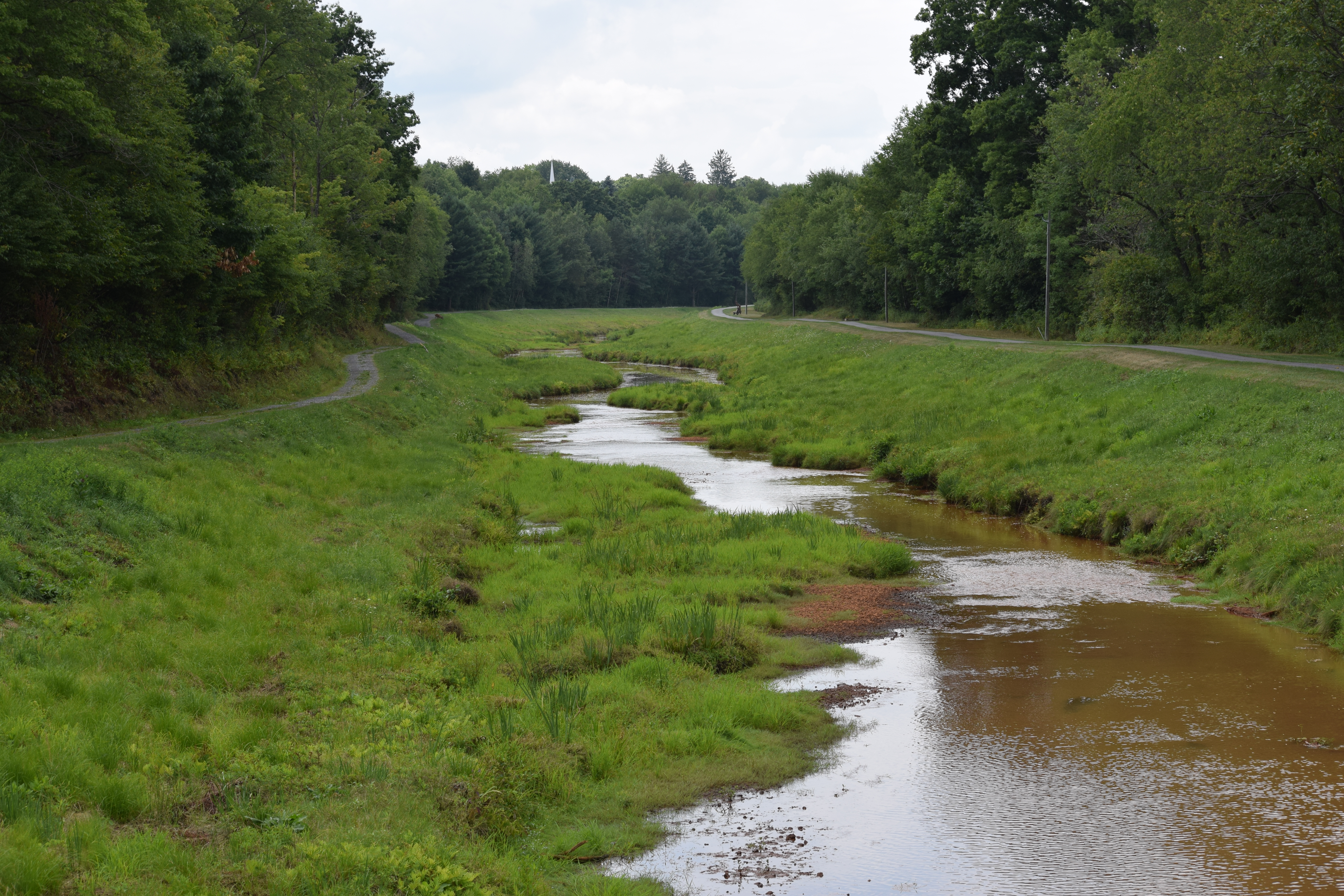
Sandy Lick Creek on the Beaver Meadow Walkway in DuBois, Pennsylvania

Sandy Lick Creek is a tributary of Redbank Creek in northwest Pennsylvania in the United States.

Sandy Lick Creek arises in Sandy Township north of Lake Sabula and joins North Fork Creek to form Redbank Creek in the borough of Brookville, Jefferson County.

== Political Subdivisions ==
The political subdivisions Sandy Lick Creek traverses, given in the order they are encountered traveling downstream, are as follows:

- Sandy Township
- DuBois
- Sandy Township
- Winslow Township
- Reynoldsville
- Winslow Township
- Knox Township
- Pine Creek Township
- Brookville

== Tributaries ==
The named tributaries of Sandy Lick Creek, given in the order they are encountered traveling downstream, are as follows:

- Lake Sabula
- Coal Run
- Muddy Run
- Narrows Creek
- Gravel Lick Run
- Laborde Branch
- Reisinger Run
- Pentz Run
- Beaver Run
- Clear Run
- Slab Run
- Wolf Run
- Panther Run
- Pitchpine Run
- Soldier Run
- Trout Run
- Schoolhouse Run
- O'Donnell Run
- Camp Run
- Fuller Run
- Cable Run
- Mill Creek
- Fivemile Run

== See also ==
- List of rivers of Pennsylvania
- List of tributaries of the Allegheny River
