= Punxsutawney Area School District =

School district in Pennsylvania

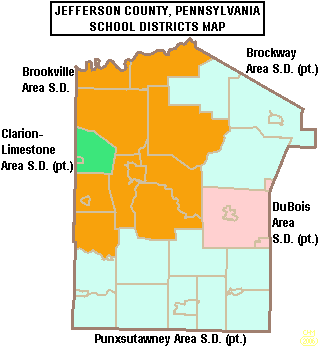

Address
- 475 Beyer Ave Punxsutawney, Indiana County and Jefferson County, Pennsylvania, 15767-1467; United States

District information
- Type: Public

Other information
- Website: http://www.punxsy.k12.pa.us/

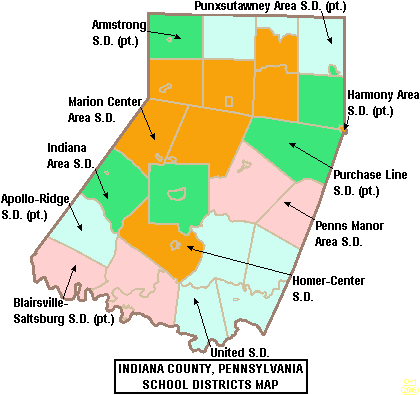
Punxsutawney Area School District region in Indiana County

The Punxsutawney Area School District (PASD) is a midsized, rural/suburban public school district located in Jefferson County, Pennsylvania and Indiana County, Pennsylvania. The Punxsutawney Area School District encompasses approximately 295 square miles (760 km^{2}). The townships of Banks and North Mahoning as well as a portion of Canoe Township are part of the district's boundaries in Indiana County. Jefferson County boroughs, including Punxsutawney, Worthville, Big Run, and Timblin, are served by the district as well. The townships of Bell, Gaskill, Young, Perry, Porter, Ringgold, Olver, McCalmont, and Henderson are also part of the district. According to the 2000 federal census data, the PASD serves a resident population of 22,055 people.

The Punxsutawney Area School District operates two schools. The Punxsutawney Area Elementary School is a K-6 building, and the Punxsutawney Area High School serves students in grades 7–12. Students may also attend Jefferson County-DuBois Area Vocational Technical School.

Since Punxsutawney is home to the famous groundhog Punxsutawney Phil, the school mascot is the Punxsy Chucks; this name comes from "woodchuck," which is another term for "groundhog."
