= Pennsylvania Route 536 =

State highway in Pennsylvania, US

Pennsylvania Route 536

Route information
- Maintained by PennDOT
- Length: 16.64 mi (26.78 km)
- Existed: 1928–present

Major junctions
- West end: PA 28 in Redbank Township
- East end: PA 36 in Young Township

Location
- Country: United States
- State: Pennsylvania
- Counties: Clarion, Armstrong, Jefferson

Highway system
- Pennsylvania State Route System; Interstate; US; State; Scenic; Legislative
| ← PA 535 | → PA 539 |

Pennsylvania Route 536 (PA 536) is a 16.6-mile-long (26.7 km) state highway located in Clarion, Armstrong, and Jefferson counties in Pennsylvania. The western terminus is at PA 28 in Redbank Township. The eastern terminus is at PA 36 in Young Township.

== Route description ==
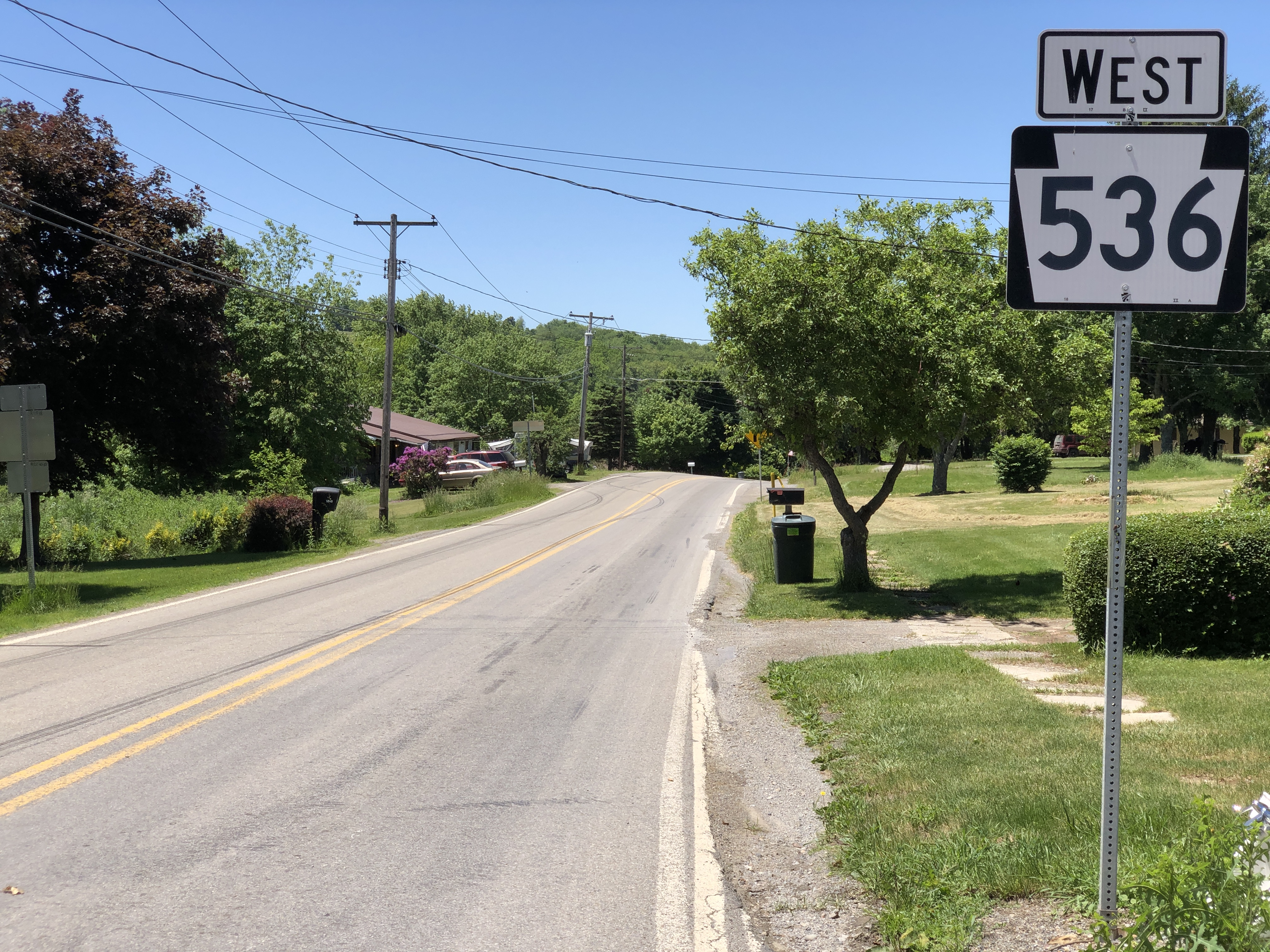
PA 536 westbound in Ringgold

PA 536 begins at an intersection with PA 28 in Redbank Township, Clarion County, heading south on two-lane undivided Mayport Road. The road heads between woods to the west and farms to the east, turning east into more woodland and curving southeast at Mayport. The route crosses the Redbank Creek into Redbank Township in Armstrong County and becomes an unnamed road, heading east into a mix of farmland and woodland with a few homes. The road turns south before a curve to the east, passing through the residential community of North Freedom.

PA 536 enters Ringgold Township in Jefferson County and continues southeast through open agricultural areas with a few residences and patches of trees. The route heads east into the residential community of Ringgold, where it turns to the south before curving east into more rural areas. The road winds east through more farm fields and wooded areas before heading into Oliver Township. Here, PA 536 turns southeast into woodland with some patches of fields and homes, crossing into Perry Township. The road heads into more agricultural areas and reaches Grange, where it curves more to the east. The route winds east through a mix of farmland and woodland with occasional homes, passing through Frostburg. Farther east, PA 536 heads into Young Township and reaches its eastern terminus at PA 36.

== Major intersections ==
| County | Location | mi | km | Destinations | Notes |
|---|---|---|---|---|---|
| Clarion | Redbank Township | 0.00 | 0.00 | PA 28 – New Bethlehem, Brookville | Western terminus |
| Armstrong | No major junctions | | | | |
| Jefferson | Young Township | 16.64 | 26.78 | PA 36 (North Main Street / Colonel Drake Highway) – Brookville, Punxsutawney | Eastern terminus |
1.000 mi = 1.609 km; 1.000 km = 0.621 mi
