= Little Sandy Creek (Redbank Creek tributary) =

Location
- State: Pennsylvania
- County: Jefferson

Physical characteristics
- Source
  - location: McCalmont Township, Jefferson County
  - coordinates: 41°01′39″N 78°57′31″W
  - elevation: 1,658 feet (505 m))
- Mouth
  - location: Redbank Township, Armstrong County
  - coordinates: 41°02′44″N 79°13′48″W
  - elevation: 1,083 feet (330 m))
- Basin size: 72.6 mi^{2} (188 km^{2})

Basin features
- River system: Allegheny River
- Tributaries
  - left: Hickok Run, Clutch Run, Big Run, Cherry Run, Nolf Run
  - right: Middle Branch Little Sandy Creek, Indiancamp Run, Lick Run, Ferguson Run, Brocious Run

Little Sandy Creek is a tributary of Redbank Creek, approximately 32.7 mi (52.6 km) long, in northwest Pennsylvania in the United States.

Little Sandy Creek arises in McCalmont Township in Jefferson County and passes through Oliver Township Beaver Township, Ringgold Township, Worthville, and Redbank Township before joining Redbank Creek in Armstrong County just upstream of the community of Mayport in Clarion County. Its tributaries, in order of their joining, and the populated places that it passes are:

- Middle Branch Little Sandy Creek
- Hickok Run
- Clutch Run
  - Hadden Run
- Indiancamp Run
- East Branch
- Coolspring
- Lick Run
- Big Run
  - McCracken Run
- Worthville
- Ferguson Run
  - Reitz Run
- Langville
- Cherry Run
- Brocious Run
- Nolf Run

Tributaries of Little Sandy Creek
Name	Number	Bank	Mouth	Political subdivision	Source	Political subdivision
Little Sandy Creek	0	Left	41°02′44″N 79°13′48″W (elev. 1,083 feet (330 m))	Redbank Township, Armstrong County	41°01′39″N 78°57′31″W	McCalmont Township, Jefferson County
Middle Branch Little Sandy Creek	1	Right	41°02′20″N 79°01′30″W (elev. 1,394 feet (425 m))	Oliver Township, Jefferson County	41°03′58″N 79°00′35″W	Knox Township, Jefferson County
Hickok Run	2	Left	41°02′04″N 79°01′54″W (elev. 1,362 feet (415 m))	Oliver Township, Jefferson County	41°01′50″N 79°00′04″W	McCalmont Township, Jefferson County
Clutch Run	3	Left	41°01′41″N 79°02′40″W (elev. 1,316 feet (401 m))	Oliver Township, Jefferson County	41°00′53″N 78°59′35″W	McCalmont Township, Jefferson County
Indiancamp Run	4	Right	41°01′56″N 79°03′01″W (elev. 1,299 feet (396 m))	Oliver Township, Jefferson County	41°04′59″N 79°01′32″W	Knox Township, Jefferson County
Lick Run	5	Right	41°02′42″N 79°05′22″W (elev. 1,234 feet (376 m))	Oliver Township, Jefferson County	41°04′39″N 79°05′28″W	Rose Township, Jefferson County
Big Run	6	Left	41°01′30″N 79°07′56″W (elev. 1,188 feet (362 m))	Ringgold Township, Jefferson County	40°58′16″N 79°02′03″W	Perry Township, Jefferson County
Ferguson Run	7	Right	41°02′06″N 79°10′12″W (elev. 1,155 feet (352 m))	Beaver Township, Jefferson County	41°03′37″N 79°07′56″W	Beaver Township, Jefferson County
Cherry Run	8	Left	41°01′58″N 79°11′05″W (elev. 1,142 feet (348 m))	Ringgold Township, Jefferson County	40°59′04″N 79°10′12″W	Ringgold Township, Jefferson County
Brocious Run	9	Right	41°02′25″N 79°12′06″W (elev. 1,132 feet (345 m))	Beaver Township, Jefferson County	41°02′58″N 79°11′23″W	Beaver Township, Jefferson County
Nolf Run	10	Left	41°02′21″N 79°13′06″W (elev. 1,109 feet (338 m))	Redbank Township, Armstrong County	41°00′11″N 79°12′24″W	Ringgold Township, Jefferson County

== See also ==
- List of rivers of Pennsylvania
- List of tributaries of the Allegheny River
