= Mahoning Creek (Allegheny River tributary) =

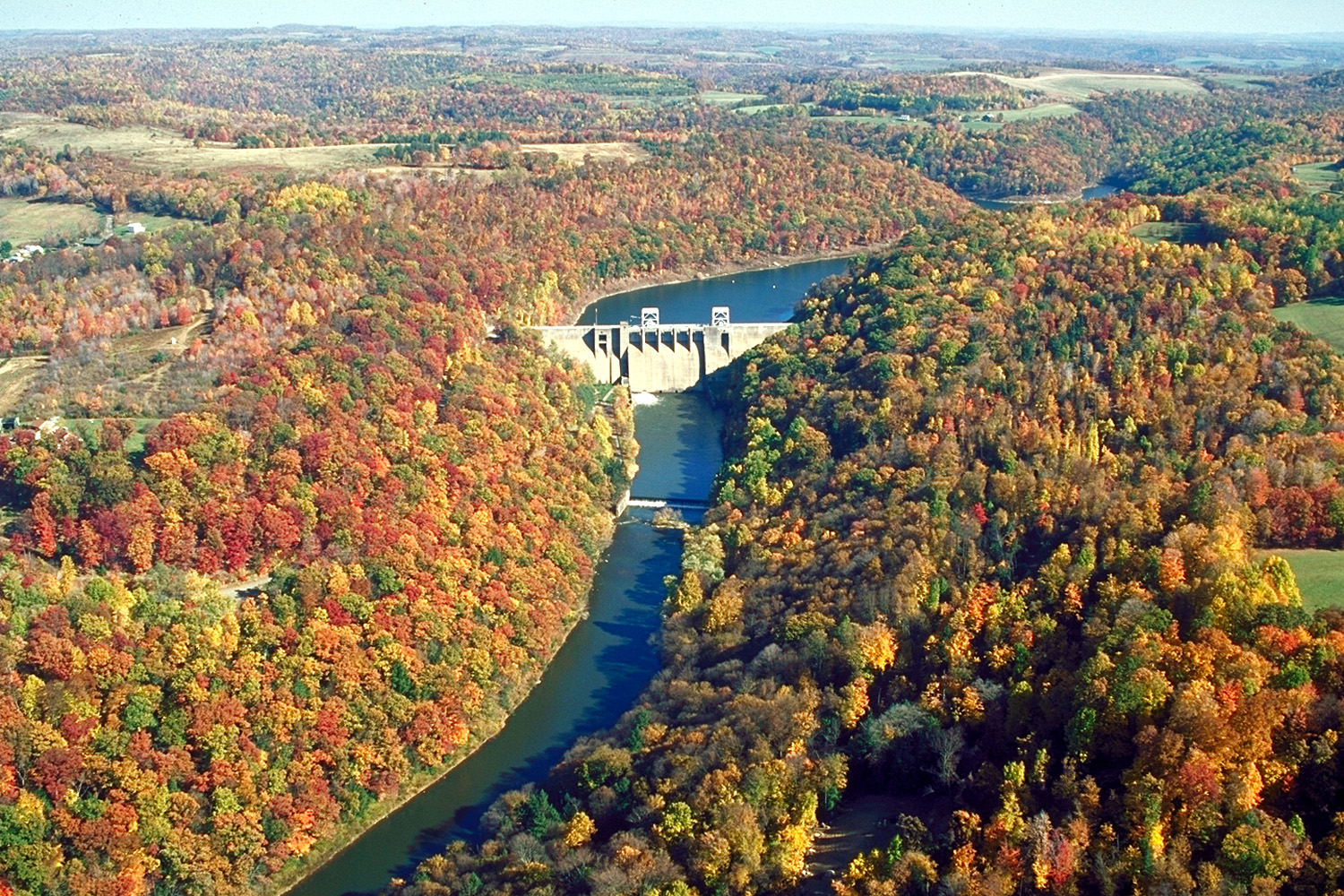
- Mahoning Creek Lake and Dam on Mahoning Creek in Armstrong County, Pennsylvania

- Location of mouth

Location
- Country: United States

Physical characteristics
- Source
  - coordinates: 40.9740°N 78.8565°W
  - elevation: 1,293 ft (394 m)
- Mouth
  - coordinates: 40°55′59″N 79°27′42″W
  - elevation: 801 ft (244 m)
- Discharge
  - location: Mahoning Creek Dam
  - average: 694 cu ft/s (19.7 m^{3}/s)

Basin features
- River system: Allegheny River
- Tributaries
  - left: East Branch Mahoning Creek, Jackson Run, Canoe Creek, Dutch Run, Carr Run, Little Mahoning Creek, Glade Run, Camp Run, Cave Run, Scrubgrass Creek
  - right: Stump Creek, Rock Run, Graffius Run, Elk Run, Sawmill Run, Rose Run, Nicely Run, Perryville Run, Foundry Run, Steer Run, Hamilton Run, Sugarcamp Run, Foundry Run, Pine Run, Little Mudlick Creek, Cathcart Run, Hamilton Run

Mahoning Creek is a tributary of the Allegheny River in Pennsylvania in the United States.

== Course ==
Portions of the Mahoning Creek watershed fall in Armstrong, Jefferson, and Indiana counties. The headwaters of Mahoning Creek are the East Branch Mahoning Creek and Stump Creek in Clearfield County. Mahoning Creek flows west through Pennsylvania and joins the Allegheny River just upstream of Templeton.

The creek can be divided into three sections:

- Upper Mahoning Creek, from the headwaters to Mahoning Creek Lake
- Mahoning Creek Lake, formed by Mahoning Creek Dam
- (Lower) Mahoning Creek, from the dam to the Allegheny River

The waterway is a popular destination for fly fishermen.

== Tributaries ==
Tributaries of Mahoning Creek
| Name | Number | Bank | Mouth | Political subdivision | Source | Political subdivision |
|---|---|---|---|---|---|---|
| Mahoning Creek | 0 | Left | 40°55′59″N 79°27′40″W (elev. 801 feet (244 m)) | Pine Township, Armstrong County | 40°58′26″N 78°51′22″W | Henderson Township, Jefferson County |
| East Branch Mahoning Creek | 1 | Left | 40°58′26″N 78°51′22″W (elev. 1,293 feet (394 m)) | Henderson Township, Jefferson County | 41°02′19″N 78°42′18″W | Brady Township, Clearfield County |
| Stump Creek | 2 | Right | 40°58′26″N 78°51′22″W (elev. 1,293 feet (394 m)) | Henderson Township, Jefferson County | 41°02′57″N 78°42′36″W | Brady Township, Clearfield County |
| Big Run | 3 | None | 40°58′05″N 78°53′21″W (elev. 1,266 feet (386 m)) | Big Run | 41°01′40″N 78°56′57″W | McCalmont Township, Jefferson County |
| Rock Run | 4 | Right | 40°57′58″N 78°54′29″W (elev. 1,263 feet (385 m)) | Bell Township, Jefferson County | 40°58′37″N 78°55′58″W | Bell Township, Jefferson County |
| Graffius Run | 5 | Right | 40°57′13″N 78°55′42″W (elev. 1,250 feet (380 m)) | Bell Township, Jefferson County | 40°58′58″N 78°56′11″W | Bell Township, Jefferson County |
| Jackson Run | 6 | Left | 40°56′46″N 78°55′41″W (elev. 1,260 feet (380 m)) | Bell Township, Jefferson County | 40°56′33″N 78°52′57″W | Gaskill Township, Jefferson County |
| Canoe Creek | 7 | Left | 40°56′13″N 78°56′15″W (elev. 1,240 feet (380 m)) | Bell Township, Jefferson County | 40°54′06″N 79°00′32″W | North Mahoning Township, Indiana County |
| Elk Run | 8 | Right | 40°56′57″N 78°57′52″W (elev. 1,234 feet (376 m)) | Punxsutawney | 41°01′18″N 78°59′02″W | McCalmont Township, Jefferson County |
| Sawmill Run | 9 | Right | 40°56′29″N 78°59′19″W (elev. 1,217 feet (371 m)) | Punxsutawney | 40°59′03″N 79°01′16″W | Oliver Township, Jefferson County |
| Rose Run | 10 | Right | 40°55′58″N 79°01′52″W (elev. 1,197 feet (365 m)) | Perry Township, Jefferson County | 40°57′40″N 79°03′13″W | Perry Township, Jefferson County |
| Nicely Run | 11 | Right | 40°55′28″N 79°03′06″W (elev. 1,171 feet (357 m)) | Perry Township, Jefferson County | 40°56′50″N 79°04′33″W | Perry Township, Jefferson County |
| Dutch Run | 12 | Left | 40°54′41″N 79°03′19″W (elev. 1,175 feet (358 m)) | Perry Township, Jefferson County | 40°53′38″N 79°01′05″W | North Mahoning Township, Indiana County |
| Perryville Run | 13 | Right | 40°55′20″N 79°04′46″W (elev. 1,168 feet (356 m)) | Perry Township, Jefferson County | 40°57′41″N 79°05′51″W | Perry Township, Jefferson County |
| Foundry Run | 14 | Right | 40°55′11″N 79°04′58″W (elev. 1,161 feet (354 m)) | Perry Township, Jefferson County | 40°57′16″N 79°06′46″W | Perry Township, Jefferson County |
| Steer Run | 15 | Right | 40°54′16″N 79°07′49″W (elev. 1,165 feet (355 m)) | West Mahoning Township, Indiana County | 40°55′55″N 79°07′33″W | Porter Township, Jefferson County |
| Carr Run | 16 | Left | 40°53′40″N 79°08′55″W (elev. 1,142 feet (348 m)) | West Mahoning Township, Indiana County | 40°53′03″N 79°05′45″W | North Mahoning Township, Indiana County |
| Hamilton Run | 17 | Right | 40°53′58″N 79°09′47″W (elev. 1,129 feet (344 m)) | West Mahoning Township, Indiana County | 40°56′38″N 79°08′32″W | Porter Township, Jefferson County |
| Sugarcamp Run | 18 | Right | 40°53′45″N 79°11′32″W (elev. 1,112 feet (339 m)) | West Mahoning Township, Indiana County | 40°55′39″N 79°09′44″W | Porter Township, Jefferson County |
| Little Mahoning Creek | 19 | Left | 40°53′45″N 79°11′46″W (elev. 1,109 feet (338 m)) | West Mahoning Township, Indiana County | 40°44′11″N 78°57′17″W | Green Township, Indiana County |
| Foundry Run | 20 | Right | 40°54′37″N 79°13′15″W (elev. 1,096 feet (334 m)) | Wayne Township, Armstrong County | 40°55′55″N 79°11′20″W | Porter Township, Jefferson County |
| Mahoning Creek Lake | 21 | None | 40°55′04″N 79°13′44″W (elev. 1,096 feet (334 m)) | Wayne Township, Armstrong County | | |
| Glade Run | 22 | Left | 40°54′53″N 79°15′47″W (elev. 1,099 feet (335 m)) | Wayne Township, Armstrong County | 40°50′42″N 79°12′23″W | West Mahoning Township, Indiana County |
| Mahoning Creek Dam | 23 | None | 40°55′18″N 79°16′38″W (elev. 1,063 feet (324 m)) | Redbank Township, Armstrong County | | |
| Camp Run | 24 | Left | 40°55′29″N 79°17′23″W (elev. 1,004 feet (306 m)) | Wayne Township, Armstrong County | 40°53′40″N 79°17′33″W | Wayne Township, Armstrong County |
| Pine Run | 25 | Right | 40°56′47″N 79°16′39″W (elev. 1,004 feet (306 m)) | Redbank Township, Armstrong County | 40°58′10″N 79°06′29″W | Perry Township, Jefferson County |
| Little Mudlick Creek | 26 | Right | 40°57′10″N 79°18′09″W (elev. 1,020 feet (310 m)) | Redbank Township, Armstrong County | 40°59′52″N 79°15′25″W | Redbank Township, Armstrong County |
| Cathcart Run | 27 | Right | 40°57′25″N 79°18′45″W (elev. 958 feet (292 m)) | Mahoning Township, Armstrong County | 40°59′15″N 79°18′06″W | Mahoning Township, Armstrong County |
| Hamilton Run | 28 | Right | 40°57′00″N 79°19′16″W (elev. 935 feet (285 m)) | Mahoning Township, Armstrong County | 40°58′46″N 79°19′44″W | Mahoning Township, Armstrong County |
| Cave Run | 29 | Left | 40°56′19″N 79°22′19″W (elev. 869 feet (265 m)) | Mahoning Township, Armstrong County | 40°55′43″N 79°22′24″W | Mahoning Township, Armstrong County |
| Scrubgrass Creek | 30 | Left | 40°55′33″N 79°25′26″W (elev. 837 feet (255 m)) | Pine Township, Armstrong County | 40°54′45″N 79°19′29″W | Wayne Township, Armstrong County |

=== East Branch Mahoning Creek ===
Tributaries of East Branch Mahoning Creek
| Name | Number | Bank | Mouth | Political subdivision | Source | Political subdivision |
|---|---|---|---|---|---|---|
| East Branch Mahoning Creek | 0 | Left | 40°58′26″N 78°51′22″W (elev. 1,293 feet (394 m)) | Henderson Township, Jefferson County | 41°02′19″N 78°42′18″W | Brady Township, Clearfield County |
| Beech Run | 1 | Left | 41°00′29″N 78°46′21″W (elev. 1,437 feet (438 m)) | Brady Township, Clearfield County | 40°59′52″N 78°42′31″W | Brady Township, Clearfield County |
| Beaver Run | 2 | Right | 41°00′06″N 78°47′35″W (elev. 1,401 feet (427 m)) | Brady Township, Clearfield County | 41°01′34″N 78°47′33″W | Troutville |
| Laurel Run | 3 | Left | 40°59′08″N 78°48′35″W (elev. 1,378 feet (420 m)) | Henderson Township, Jefferson County | 40°57′47″N 78°45′57″W | Bell Township, Clearfield County |
| Clover Run | 4 | Left | 40°57′49″N 78°50′58″W (elev. 1,309 feet (399 m)) | Gaskill Township, Jefferson County | 40°56′15″N 78°47′19″W | Bell Township, Clearfield County |

=== Little Mahoning Creek ===
Tributaries of Little Mahoning Creek
| Name | Number | Bank | Mouth | Political subdivision | Source | Political subdivision |
|---|---|---|---|---|---|---|
| Little Mahoning Creek | 0 | Left | 40°53′45″N 79°11′46″W (elev. 1,109 feet (338 m)) | West Mahoning Township, Indiana County | 40°44′11″N 78°57′17″W | Green Township, Indiana County |
| East Run | 1 | Right | 40°46′47″N 78°56′47″W (elev. 1,463 feet (446 m)) | Grant Township, Indiana County | 40°44′17″N 78°53′54″W | Montgomery Township, Indiana County |
| Rairigh Run | 2 | Right | 40°47′13″N 78°56′17″W (elev. 1,450 feet (440 m)) | Grant Township, Indiana County | 40°45′49″N 78°53′58″W | Montgomery Township, Indiana County |
| Straight Run | 3 | Right | 40°49′30″N 78°55′36″W (elev. 1,365 feet (416 m)) | Canoe Township, Indiana County | 40°51′42″N 78°52′39″W | Banks Township, Indiana County |
| Rishell Run | 4 | Right | 40°49′44″N 78°56′23″W (elev. 1,345 feet (410 m)) | Grant Township, Indiana County | 40°50′32″N 78°56′54″W | Canoe Township, Indiana County |
| Barrett Run | 5 | Left | 40°49′39″N 78°57′34″W (elev. 1,319 feet (402 m)) | Grant Township, Indiana County | 40°48′49″N 78°57′11″W | Grant Township, Indiana County |
| Brewer Run | 6 | Right | 40°49′38″N 78°57′53″W (elev. 1,322 feet (403 m)) | Grant Township, Indiana County | 40°51′38″N 78°57′50″W | Canoe Township, Indiana County |
| Broadhead Run | 7 | Right | 40°49′32″N 78°58′36″W (elev. 1,283 feet (391 m)) | Grant Township, Indiana County | 40°52′01″N 78°59′31″W | North Mahoning Township, Indiana County |
| Crooked Run | 8 | Left | 40°49′11″N 78°59′32″W (elev. 1,253 feet (382 m)) | Grant Township, Indiana County | 40°46′52″N 78°59′39″W | Grant Township, Indiana County |
| Leasure Run | 9 | Right | 40°49′14″N 78°59′41″W (elev. 1,253 feet (382 m)) | East Mahoning Township, Indiana County | 40°51′38″N 79°00′23″W | North Mahoning Township, Indiana County |
| Pickering Run | 10 | Left | 40°49′14″N 79°02′51″W (elev. 1,220 feet (370 m)) | East Mahoning Township, Indiana County | 40°46′42″N 79°00′11″W | East Mahoning Township, Indiana County |
| Mudlick Run | 11 | Right | 40°51′11″N 79°04′36″W (elev. 1,194 feet (364 m)) | North Mahoning Township, Indiana County | 40°52′16″N 79°01′22″W | North Mahoning Township, Indiana County |
| Ross Run | 12 | Left | 40°50′04″N 79°07′53″W (elev. 1,175 feet (358 m)) | South Mahoning Township, Indiana County | 40°47′46″N 79°05′21″W | East Mahoning Township, Indiana County |

=== Pine Run ===
Tributaries of Pine Run
| Name | Number | Bank | Mouth | Political subdivision | Source | Political subdivision |
|---|---|---|---|---|---|---|
| Pine Run | 0 | Right | 40°56′47″N 79°16′39″W (elev. 1,004 feet (306 m)) | Redbank Township, Armstrong County | 40°58′10″N 79°06′29″W | Perry Township, Jefferson County |
| Middle Branch Pine Run | 1 | Left | 40°57′54″N 79°08′57″W (elev. 1,306 feet (398 m)) | Ringgold Township, Jefferson County | 40°56′53″N 79°07′39″W | Porter Township, Jefferson County |
| Caylor Run | 2 | Right | 40°58′05″N 79°10′14″W (elev. 1,273 feet (388 m)) | Ringgold Township, Jefferson County | 40°59′41″N 79°09′02″W | Ringgold Township, Jefferson County |
| Eagle Run | 3 | Right | 40°57′53″N 79°12′00″W (elev. 1,237 feet (377 m)) | Timblin | 40°59′48″N 79°11′23″W | Ringgold Township, Jefferson County |
| Painter Run | 4 | Right | 40°58′00″N 79°12′39″W (elev. 1,224 feet (373 m)) | Timblin | 40°59′59″N 79°11′33″W | Ringgold Township, Jefferson County |
| Nye Branch | 5 | Left | 40°57′45″N 79°13′17″W (elev. 1,204 feet (367 m)) | Redbank Township, Armstrong County | 40°56′37″N 79°09′29″W | Porter Township, Jefferson County |
| Sugarcamp Run | 6 | Right | 40°57′43″N 79°14′13″W (elev. 1,197 feet (365 m)) | Redbank Township, Armstrong County | 40°59′40″N 79°13′05″W | Redbank Township, Armstrong County |
| Mudlick Creek | 7 | Right | 40°57′45″N 79°15′09″W (elev. 1,148 feet (350 m)) | Redbank Township, Armstrong County | 41°01′14″N 79°13′25″W | Redbank Township, Armstrong County |

== Political subdivisions ==
Mahoning Creek traverses the following political subdivisions, listed in order of encounter traveling downstream,

- Henderson Township, Jefferson County
- Big Run
- Bell Township, Jefferson County
- Punxsutawney
- Perry Township, Jefferson County
- West Mahoning Township, Indiana County
- Wayne Township, Armstrong County
- Redbank Township, Armstrong County
- Mahoning Township, Armstrong County
- Pine Township, Armstrong County

East Branch Mahoning Creek traverses the following political subdivisions, listed in order of encounter traveling downstream.

- Brady Township, Clearfield County
- Henderson Township, Jefferson County
- Gaskill Township, Jefferson County

Little Mahoning Creek traverses the following political subdivisions, listed in order of encounter traveling downstream.

- Green Township, Indiana County
- Grant Township, Indiana County
- Canoe Township, Indiana County
- East Mahoning Township, Indiana County
- North Mahoning Township, Indiana County
- South Mahoning Township, Indiana County
- West Mahoning Township, Indiana County

Pine Run traverses the following political subdivisions, listed in order of encounter traveling downstream,

- Perry Township, Jefferson County
- Ringgold Township, Jefferson County
- Timblin
- Redbank Township, Armstrong County

== See also ==
- Tributaries of the Allegheny River
- List of rivers of Pennsylvania
- List of tributaries of the Allegheny River
