= Ringgold Township, Pennsylvania =

Township in Pennsylvania, US

Coordinates: 41°00′05″N 79°09′44″W

- Township
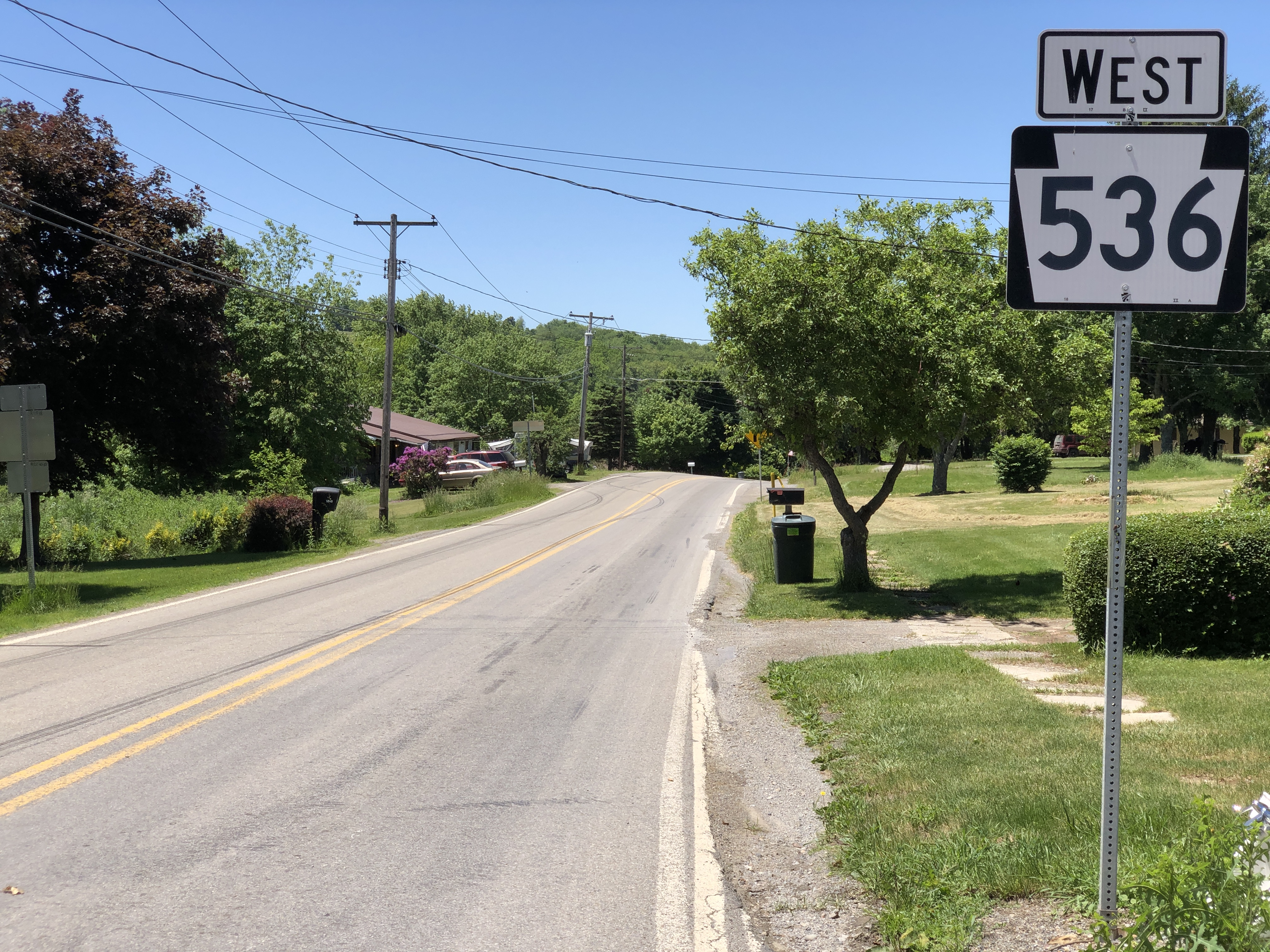
- PA 536 in Ringgold Township

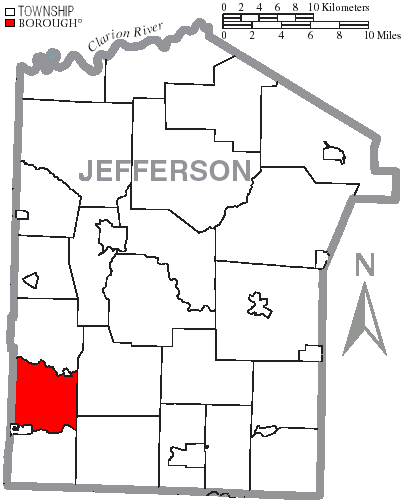
- Map of Jefferson County, Pennsylvania Highlighting Ringgold Township

- Map of Jefferson County, Pennsylvania
- Country: United States
- State: Pennsylvania
- County: Jefferson
- Settled: 1818
- Incorporated: 1848

Government
  - Type: Township of the Second Class, having a three-member board of supervisors

Area
  - Total: 19.27 sq mi (49.91 km^{2})
  - Land: 19.14 sq mi (49.57 km^{2})
  - Water: 0.13 sq mi (0.34 km^{2})

Population (2020)
  - Total: 772 ▼
  - Estimate (2023): 758
  - Density: 40.3/sq mi (15.6/km^{2})
- Time zone: UTC-5 (Eastern (EST))
  - Summer (DST): UTC-4 (EDT)
- FIPS code: 42-065-64960
- Website: https://www.ringgoldtownship.org/

Ringgold Township is a township in Jefferson County, Pennsylvania, United States. The population was 772 at the 2020 census.

The township was named after Maj. Samuel Ringgold, a hero of the Battle of Palo Alto in the Mexican–American War.

== Geography ==
The township is in southwestern Jefferson County and is bordered to the west by Armstrong County. It is bordered to the southwest by the borough of Timblin and to the northeast by the borough of Worthville. Unincorporated communities in the township include Ringgold, Dora, and North Freedom.

According to the United States Census Bureau, Ringgold Township has a total area of 19.3 square miles (49.9 km^{2}), of which 19.2 square miles (49.6 km^{2}) are land and 0.1 square miles (0.3 km^{2}), or 0.68%, are water. Little Sandy Creek, a westward-flowing tributary of Redbank Creek, forms the northern border of the township, and Pine Run, a westward-flowing tributary of Mahoning Creek, forms the southern border. The entire township lies in the Allegheny River watershed.

== Demographics ==
Historical population
Census	Pop.	Note	%±
1850	665		—
1860	909		36.7%
1870	1,006		10.7%
1880	1,078		7.2%
1890	1,004		−6.9%
1900	1,037		3.3%
1910	1,190		14.8%
1920	1,178		−1.0%
1930	1,239		5.2%
1940	1,189		−4.0%
1950	916		−23.0%
1960	771		−15.8%
1970	735		−4.7%
1980	883		20.1%
1990	705		−20.2%
2000	764		8.4%
2010	741		−3.0%
2020	772		4.2%
2023 (est.)	758		−1.8%
U.S. Decennial Census

As of the census of 2000, there were 764 people, 305 households, and 228 families residing in the township. The population density was 39.9 inhabitants per square mile (15.4/km^{2}). There were 330 housing units at an average density of 17.2/sq mi (6.7/km^{2}). The racial makeup of the township was 99.48% White, 0.13% Asian, 0.13% from other races, and 0.26% from two or more races. Hispanic or Latino of any race were 0.65% of the population.

There were 305 households, out of which 31.1% had children under the age of 18 living with them, 66.6% were married couples living together, 4.9% had a female householder with no husband present, and 25.2% were non-families. 21.0% of all households were made up of individuals, and 11.8% had someone living alone who was 65 years of age or older. The average household size was 2.50 and the average family size was 2.89.

In the township the population was spread out, with 22.3% under the age of 18, 7.2% from 18 to 24, 27.1% from 25 to 44, 25.5% from 45 to 64, and 17.9% who were 65 years of age or older. The median age was 41 years. For every 100 females, there were 107.6 males. For every 100 females age 18 and over, there were 101.4 males.

The median income for a household in the township was $32,292, and the median income for a family was $34,706. Males had a median income of $28,672 versus $22,386 for females. The per capita income for the township was $14,669. About 7.0% of families and 8.4% of the population were below the poverty line, including 5.4% of those under age 18 and 7.5% of those age 65 or over.
