= Gaskill Township, Jefferson County, Pennsylvania =

Township in Pennsylvania, US

Coordinates: 40°57′00″N 78°52′59″W

Gaskill Township, Pennsylvania
- Township
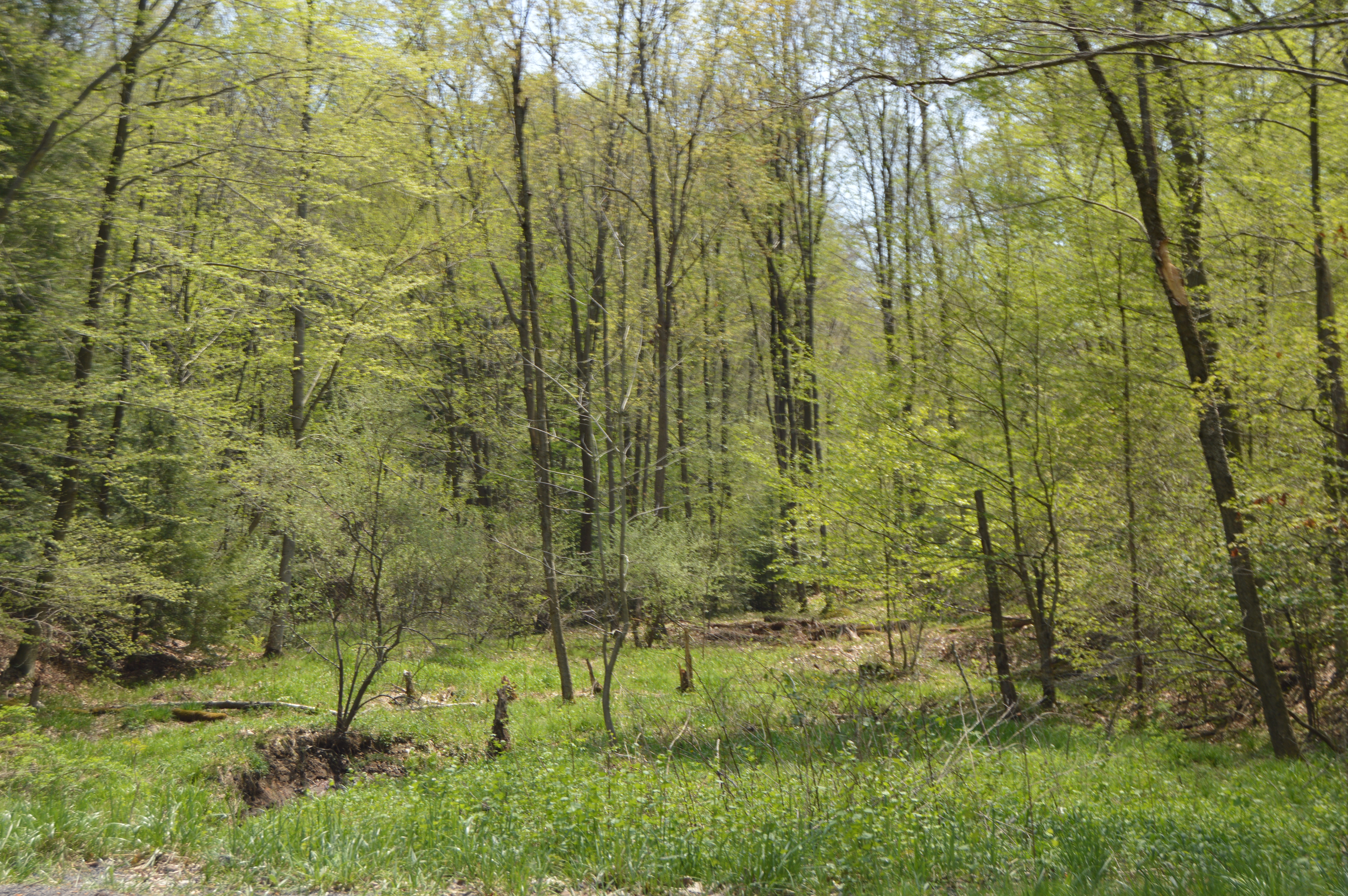
- Wooded scene along Winslow Road

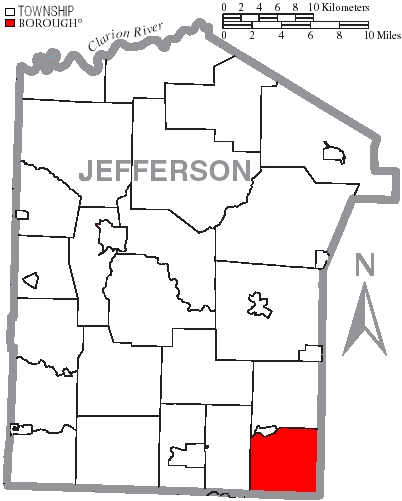
- Map of Jefferson County, Pennsylvania Highlighting Gaskill Township

- Map of Jefferson County, Pennsylvania
- Country: United States
- State: Pennsylvania
- County: Jefferson
- Settled: 1818
- Incorporated: 1842

Area
  - Total: 21.49 sq mi (55.67 km^{2})
  - Land: 21.37 sq mi (55.36 km^{2})
  - Water: 0.12 sq mi (0.31 km^{2})

Population (2020)
  - Total: 676 ▼
  - Estimate (2023): 664
  - Density: 31.6/sq mi (12.2/km^{2})
- Time zone: UTC-5 (Eastern (EST))
  - Summer (DST): UTC-4 (EDT)
- FIPS code: 42-065-28592

Gaskill Township is a township in Jefferson County, Pennsylvania, United States. The population was 676 at the 2020 census. It was named for Charles C. Gaskill, agent of the Holland Land Company.

== Geography ==
Gaskill Township occupies the southeastern corner of Jefferson County, and is bordered to the east by Clearfield County and to the south by Indiana County. It is bordered to the northwest by the borough of Big Run.

According to the United States Census Bureau, the township has a total area of 21.5 square miles (55.7 km^{2}), of which 21.4 square miles (55.4 km^{2}) are land and 0.1 square miles (0.3 km^{2}), or 0.56%, are water. Mahoning Creek, a tributary of the Allegheny River, forms the northwestern border of the township.

Unincorporated communities in the township include Winslow, Bowersville and Foxburg.

== History ==
Gaskill was founded in 1841, from a portion of Young Township.

== Demographics ==
Historical population
Census	Pop.	Note	%±
1850	603		—
1860	320		−46.9%
1870	478		49.4%
1880	540		13.0%
1890	682		26.3%
1900	713		4.5%
1910	888		24.5%
1920	912		2.7%
1930	671		−26.4%
1940	680		1.3%
1950	519		−23.7%
1960	544		4.8%
1970	451		−17.1%
1980	671		48.8%
1990	675		0.6%
2000	671		−0.6%
2010	708		5.5%
2020	676		−4.5%
2023 (est.)	664		−1.8%
U.S. Decennial Census

As of the census of 2000, there were 671 people, 247 households, and 189 families residing in the township. The population density was 31.2 inhabitants per square mile (12.0/km^{2}). There were 327 housing units at an average density of 15.2/sq mi (5.9/km^{2}). The racial makeup of the township was 99.11% White, 0.15% Asian, 0.45% Pacific Islander, and 0.30% from two or more races.

There were 247 households, out of which 34.0% had children under the age of 18 living with them, 62.3% were married couples living together, 8.5% had a female householder with no husband present, and 23.1% were non-families. 18.6% of all households were made up of individuals, and 8.9% had someone living alone who was 65 years of age or older. The average household size was 2.63 and the average family size was 2.98.

In the township the population was spread out, with 24.9% under the age of 18, 6.7% from 18 to 24, 28.3% from 25 to 44, 22.8% from 45 to 64, and 17.3% who were 65 years of age or older. The median age was 39 years. For every 100 females there were 95.6 males. For every 100 females age 18 and over, there were 90.2 males.

The median income for a household in the township was $30,536, and the median income for a family was $36,563. Males had a median income of $29,444 versus $16,719 for females. The per capita income for the township was $14,649. About 7.6% of families and 10.9% of the population were below the poverty line, including 10.7% of those under age 18 and 6.7% of those age 65 or over.
