= Bell Township, Jefferson County, Pennsylvania =

Township in Pennsylvania, US

Coordinates: 40°57′00″N 78°54′59″W

- Township
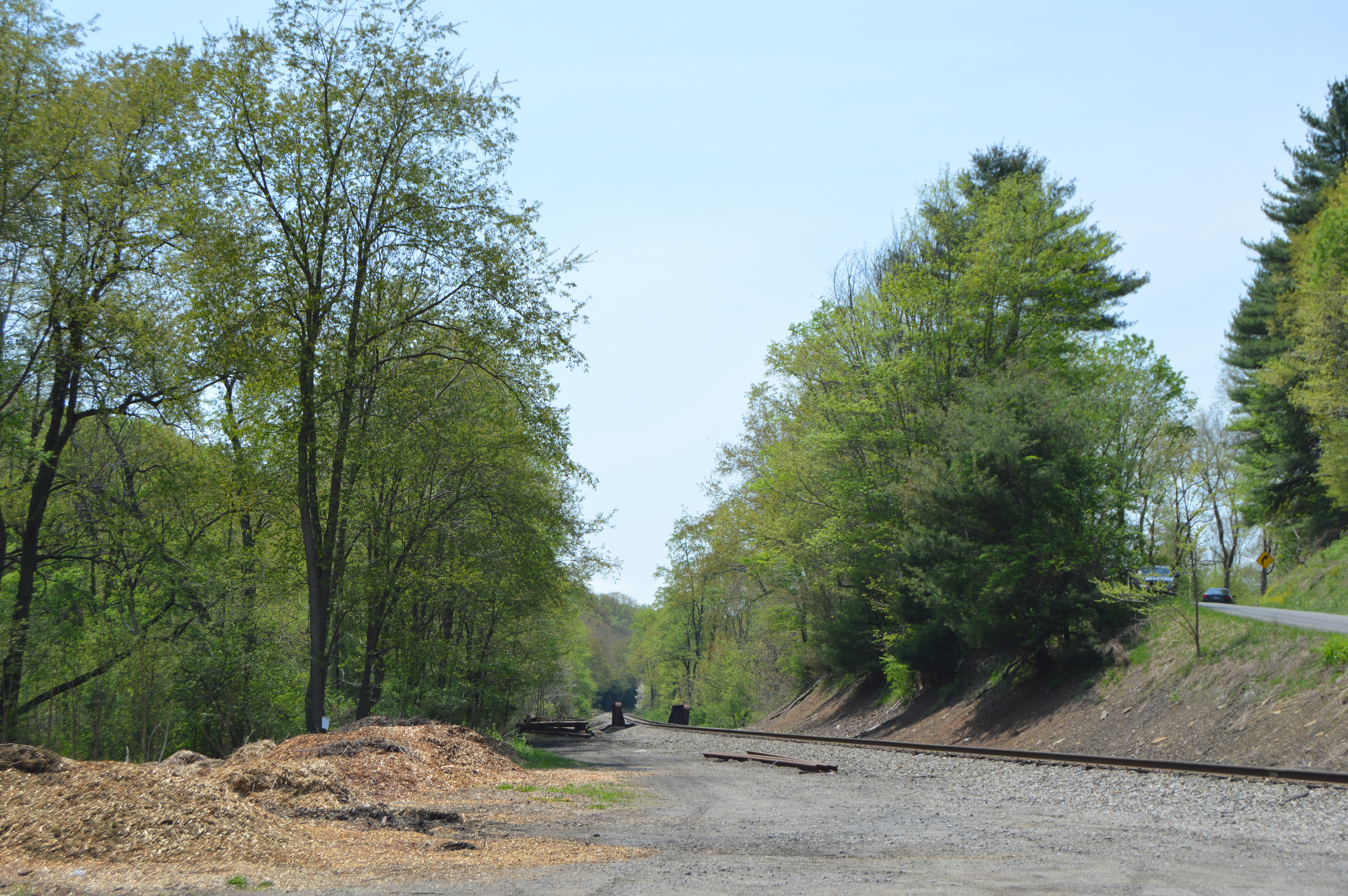
- Rail line southeast of Punxsutawney

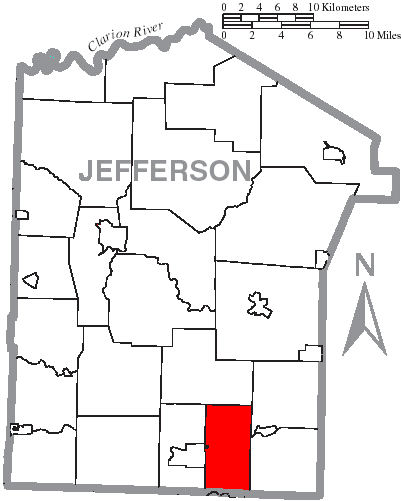
- Map of Jefferson County, Pennsylvania Highlighting Bell Township

- Map of Jefferson County, Pennsylvania
- Country: United States
- State: Pennsylvania
- County: Jefferson
- Settled: 1818
- Incorporated: 1857

Area
  - Total: 18.76 sq mi (48.59 km^{2})
  - Land: 18.58 sq mi (48.12 km^{2})
  - Water: 0.18 sq mi (0.47 km^{2})

Population (2020)
  - Total: 2,010
  - Estimate (2023): 1,972
  - Density: 108/sq mi (41.8/km^{2})
- Time zone: UTC-5 (Eastern (EST))
  - Summer (DST): UTC-4 (EDT)
- FIPS code: 42-065-05200

Bell Township is a township in Jefferson County, Pennsylvania, United States. The population was 2,010 at the 2020 census, down from 2,056 at the 2010 census. It was named for John H. Bell, a prominent citizen of the township.

== Geography ==
The township is in southeastern Jefferson County and is bordered to the south by Indiana County. The borough of Punxsutawney borders the township to the west. Unincorporated communities in the township include Cloe, Fairview, Albion, Robertsville, Bells Mills, Riker and Spindletown.

According to the United States Census Bureau, the township has a total area of 18.8 square miles (48.6 km^{2}), of which 18.6 square miles (48.1 km^{2}) are land and 0.2 square miles (0.5 km^{2}), or 0.96%, are water. Mahoning Creek, a tributary of the Allegheny River, flows from east to west across the center of the township. U.S. Route 119 is the main highway across the township, following the Mahoning Creek valley, and leading west into Punxsutawney and northeast into Big Run.

== Demographics ==
Historical population
Census	Pop.	Note	%±
1860	792		—
1870	785		−0.9%
1880	887		13.0%
1890	1,015		14.4%
1900	1,392		37.1%
1910	1,928		38.5%
1920	1,606		−16.7%
1930	1,411		−12.1%
1940	1,623		15.0%
1950	1,647		1.5%
1960	1,705		3.5%
1970	1,686		−1.1%
1980	2,144		27.2%
1990	2,055		−4.2%
2000	2,029		−1.3%
2010	2,056		1.3%
2020	2,010		−2.2%
2023 (est.)	1,972		−1.9%
U.S. Decennial Census

As of the census of 2000, there were 2,029 people, 811 households, and 614 families residing in the township. The population density was 108.4 inhabitants per square mile (41.9/km^{2}). There were 874 housing units at an average density of 46.7 per square mile (18.0/km^{2}). The racial makeup of the township was 99.16% White, 0.25% Asian, 0.05% from other races, and 0.54% from two or more races. Hispanic or Latino of any race were 0.30% of the population.

There were 811 households, out of which 33.5% had children under the age of 18 living with them, 64.4% were married couples living together, 7.2% had a female householder with no husband present, and 24.2% were non-families. 21.3% of all households were made up of individuals, and 12.0% had someone living alone who was 65 years of age or older. The average household size was 2.50 and the average family size was 2.90.

In the township the population was spread out, with 23.4% under the age of 18, 5.7% from 18 to 24, 28.7% from 25 to 44, 26.0% from 45 to 64, and 16.2% who were 65 years of age or older. The median age was 41 years. For every 100 females there were 102.1 males. For every 100 females age 18 and over, there were 96.8 males.

The median income for a household in the township was $36,250, and the median income for a family was $40,741. Males had a median income of $31,557 versus $20,694 for females. The per capita income for the township was $18,130. About 4.8% of families and 5.5% of the population were below the poverty line, including 9.4% of those under age 18 and 2.4% of those age 65 or over.
