= McCrea Furnace, Pennsylvania =

Unincorporated community in Pennsylvania, US

- Unincorporated community
- Location within Pennsylvania
- Coordinates: 40°55′34″N 79°17′27″W
- Country: United States
- State: Pennsylvania
- County: Armstrong
- Township: Wayne
- Elevation: 1,407 ft (429 m)
- Time zone: UTC-5 (Eastern (EST))
  - Summer (DST): UTC-4 (EDT)
- ZIP code: 16222
- GNIS feature ID: 1204130

McCrea Furnace is an unincorporated community near Mahoning Creek Dam in Wayne Township, Armstrong County, Pennsylvania, United States.
