= Banks Township, Pennsylvania =

Banks Township is the name of some places in the U.S. state of Pennsylvania:

- Banks Township, Carbon County, Pennsylvania
- Banks Township, Indiana County, Pennsylvania
