= Mayport =

Mayport may refer to:

- Mayport (Jacksonville), in Jacksonville, Florida
- Mayport, Pennsylvania
- Naval Station Mayport, in Jacksonville, Florida
