= Panic, Pennsylvania =

Unincorporated community in Pennsylvania, U.S.

Coordinates: 41°02′10″N 78°56′50″W

Panic is an unincorporated community in Jefferson County, Pennsylvania, United States.

== History ==
A post office was established at Panic in 1881, and remained in operation until it was discontinued in 1904. The community most likely was named after the Panic of 1873. A folk etymology maintains the name originated when a pioneer fought off a bear with an axe. Panic has frequently been noted on lists of unusual place names.

The first church in McCalmont Township was built at Panic in 1871. The township's first store was also established in Panic in 1882. By 1917, Panic was described as a "tiny village".
