= Porter, Pennsylvania =

Unincorporated community in Pennsylvania, US

Coordinates: 40°56′02″N 79°10′07″W

Porter is an unincorporated community in Jefferson County, in the U.S. state of Pennsylvania.

== History ==
A post office called Porter was established in 1850, and remained in operation until 1973. The community is located in Porter Township, which was named for Commodore David Porter.
