= Valier, Pennsylvania =

- Unincorporated community
- Location within Pennsylvania Location within the United States
- Coordinates: 40°54′57″N 79°02′41″W
- Country: United States
- State: Pennsylvania
- County: Jefferson
- Township: Perry
- Elevation: 1,253 ft (382 m)
- Time zone: UTC-5 (Eastern (EST))
  - Summer (DST): UTC-4 (EDT)
- ZIP code: 15780
- Area code: 814
- GNIS feature ID: 1190282

Valier is an unincorporated community in Jefferson County, Pennsylvania, United States. The community is 4.3 miles (6.9 km) west-southwest of Punxsutawney. Valier had a post office with ZIP code 15780, which opened on August 4, 1885. Closed in 2014. The Valier Coal Company once operated in this mining community.
