= Oliveburg, Pennsylvania =

Oliveburg
- Unincorporated community
- Interactive map of Oliveburg
- Coordinates: 40°59′27″N 79°01′35″W
- Country: United States
- State: Pennsylvania
- County: Jefferson
- Township: Oliver
- Post office: 1862 (closed 2010)
- Time zone: UTC-5 (EST)
  - Summer (DST): UTC-4 (EDT)

Oliveburg is an unincorporated community in Jefferson County, in the U.S. state of Pennsylvania.

== History ==
A post office was established at Oliveburg in 1862; but closed in 2010.
