= East Branch, Pennsylvania =

- Unincorporated community
- Location within Pennsylvania
- Coordinates: 41°01′59″N 79°03′03″W
- Country: United States
- State: Pennsylvania
- County: Jefferson
- Township: Oliver Township
- Elevation: 1,306 ft (398 m)
- Time zone: UTC-5 (Eastern (EST))
  - Summer (DST): UTC-4 (EDT)
- GNIS feature ID: 1209134

East Branch is an unincorporated community located at the confluence of the East Branch of Little Sandy Creek with the main stream in Oliver Township, Jefferson County, Pennsylvania, United States.
