= Porter Township, Jefferson County, Pennsylvania =

Township in Pennsylvania, US

Coordinates: 40°56′17″N 79°10′12″W

- Township
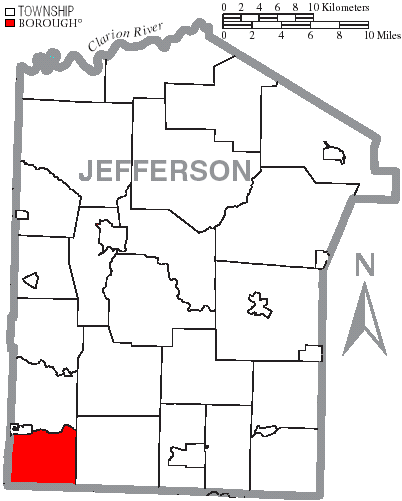
- Map of Jefferson County, Pennsylvania Highlighting Porter Township

- Map of Jefferson County, Pennsylvania
- Country: United States
- State: Pennsylvania
- County: Jefferson
- Settled: 1803
- Incorporated: 1840

Government
  - Type: Township of the Second Class, having a three-member board of supervisors

Area
  - Total: 17.55 sq mi (45.45 km^{2})
  - Land: 17.53 sq mi (45.40 km^{2})
  - Water: 0.019 sq mi (0.05 km^{2})

Population (2020)
  - Total: 299
  - Estimate (2023): 294
  - Density: 17.0/sq mi (6.56/km^{2})
- Time zone: UTC-5 (Eastern (EST))
  - Summer (DST): UTC-4 (EDT)
- FIPS code: 42-065-62176

Porter Township is a township in Jefferson County, Pennsylvania, United States. The population was 299 at the 2020 census.

Porter Township was organized in 1840, and was named for Governor of Pennsylvania David R. Porter.

== Geography ==
The township occupies the southwestern corner of Jefferson County, bordered to the south by Indiana County and to the west by Armstrong County. The borough of Timblin borders the western part of the northern edge of the township. Unincorporated communities in the township include Porter and Corbettown.

According to the United States Census Bureau, the township has a total area of 17.55 square miles (45.45 km^{2}), of which 0.02 square miles (0.05 km^{2}), or 0.10%, are water.

== Demographics ==
Historical population
Census	Pop.	Note	%±
1850	728		—
1860	516		−29.1%
1870	525		1.7%
1880	669		27.4%
1890	647		−3.3%
1900	592		−8.5%
1910	575		−2.9%
1920	900		56.5%
1930	771		−14.3%
1940	580		−24.8%
1950	483		−16.7%
1960	324		−32.9%
1970	280		−13.6%
1980	313		11.8%
1990	310		−1.0%
2000	282		−9.0%
2010	305		8.2%
2020	299		−2.0%
2023 (est.)	294		−1.7%
U.S. Decennial Census

As of the census of 2000, there were 282 people, 110 households, and 85 families residing in the township. The population density was 15.9 people per square mile (6.1/km^{2}). There were 137 housing units at an average density of 7.7/sq mi (3.0/km^{2}). The racial makeup of the township was 100.00% White.

There were 110 households, out of which 27.3% had children under the age of 18 living with them, 60.9% were married couples living together, 8.2% had a female householder with no husband present, and 22.7% were non-families. 16.4% of all households were made up of individuals, and 7.3% had someone living alone who was 65 years of age or older. The average household size was 2.56 and the average family size was 2.85.

In the township the population was spread out, with 24.1% under the age of 18, 7.1% from 18 to 24, 26.2% from 25 to 44, 24.8% from 45 to 64, and 17.7% who were 65 years of age or older. The median age was 39 years. For every 100 females, there were 94.5 males. For every 100 females age 18 and over, there were 96.3 males.

The median income for a household in the township was $28,214, and the median income for a family was $29,500. Males had a median income of $28,393 versus $16,250 for females. The per capita income for the township was $12,800. About 7.7% of families and 17.5% of the population were below the poverty line, including 40.8% of those under the age of 18 and 14.3% of those 65 or over.
