= Winslow, Pennsylvania =

Unincorporated community in Pennsylvania, U.S.

Coordinates: 40°55′28″N 78°53′02″W

Winslow is an unincorporated community in Jefferson County, in the U.S. state of Pennsylvania.

== History ==
A post office was established as Hudson in 1869, the name was changed to Winslow in 1888, and the post office closed in 1923. Augustus G. Winslow was the first postmaster.
