= Cloe, Pennsylvania =

Unincorporated community in Pennsylvania, U.S.

Coordinates: 40°56′13″N 78°55′57″W

Cloe is an unincorporated community in Jefferson County, in the U.S. state of Pennsylvania.

== History ==
A post office called Cloe was established in 1892, and remained in operation until 1964. In 1917, Cloe was the only post office in Bell Township.
