= Coolspring, Pennsylvania =

- Unincorporated community
- Location within Pennsylvania Location within the United States
- Coordinates: 41°02′35″N 79°05′01″W
- Country: United States
- State: Pennsylvania
- County: Jefferson
- Township: Oliver
- Elevation: 1,260 ft (380 m)
- Time zone: UTC-5 (Eastern (EST))
  - Summer (DST): UTC-4 (EDT)
- ZIP code: 15730
- Area code: 814
- GNIS feature ID: 1172400

Coolspring is an unincorporated community in Jefferson County, Pennsylvania, United States. The community is located along Pennsylvania Route 36, 9 miles (14 km) northwest of Punxsutawney.

Coolspring was served by a post office from 1838 until 1966.
