= Mahoning Creek Dam =

Dam in Armstrong County, Pennsylvania, US

Coordinates: 40°55′19″N 79°16′39″W

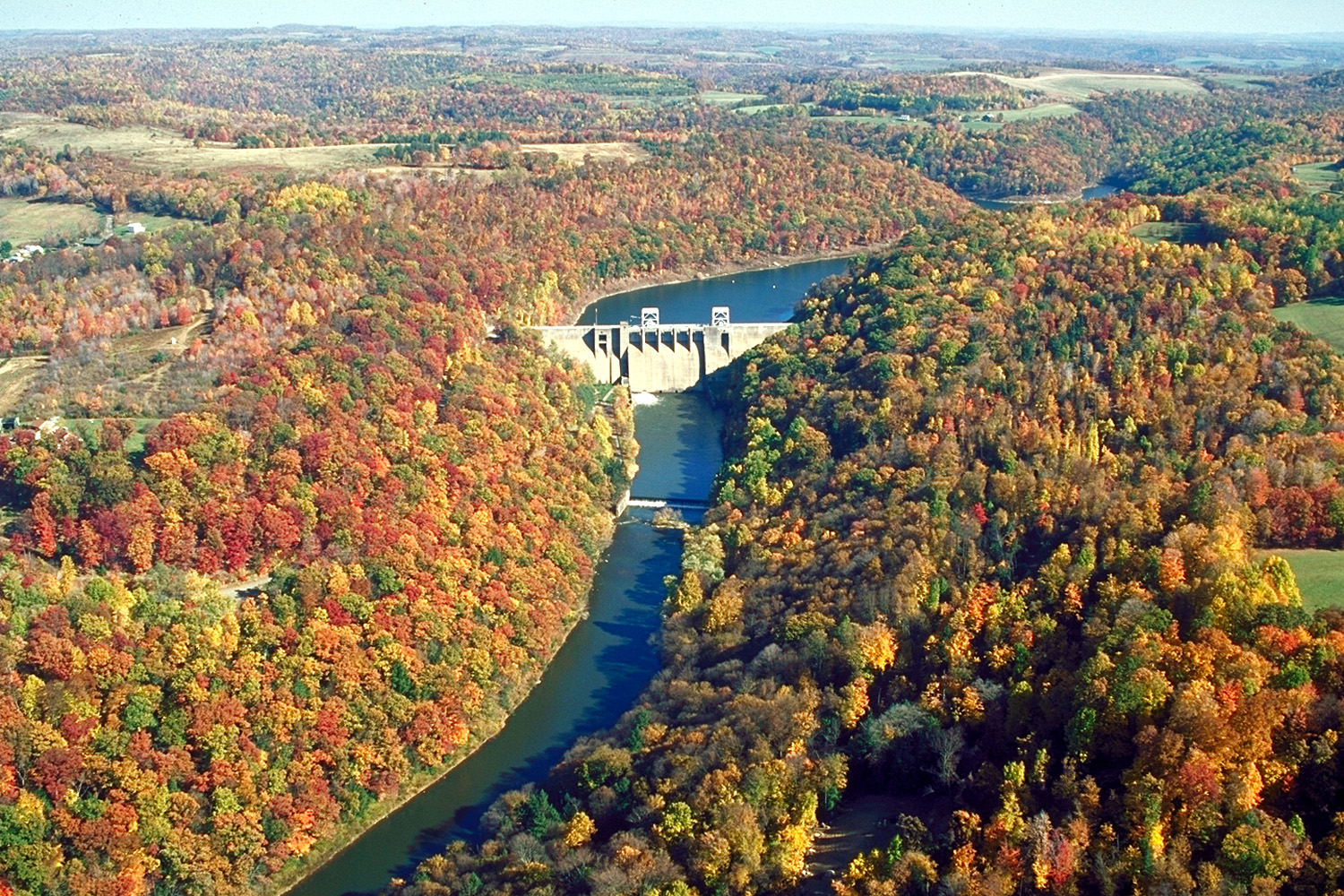
Mahoning Creek Lake and Dam

The Mahoning Creek Dam is a dam in Armstrong County, Pennsylvania.

== History and notable features ==
The concrete gravity dam was constructed in 1941 by the United States Army Corps of Engineers, with a height of 162 feet (49 m), and a length of 926 feet (282 m) at its crest.

Located between Redbank Township and Wayne Township in Armstrong County, it impounds Mahoning Creek, a tributary of the Allegheny River, primarily for flood control, and is one of sixteen flood control projects in the area. The dam is owned and operated by the Pittsburgh District, Great Lakes and Ohio River Division, Army Corps of Engineers.

In 2012, the dam was retrofitted for hydroelectric power generation which produces about 6 MW.

The riverine reservoir it creates, Mahoning Creek Lake, has a normal water surface of 280 acres (110 ha), a maximum capacity of 94,000 acre-feet (116,000,000 m^{3}), and a normal capacity of 9,550 acre-feet (11,780,000 m^{3}).

Recreation opportunities here include boating, fishing, camping, and hiking, as well the facilities of the state-run Mahoning Creek Lake Park.
