= Wayne Township, Armstrong County, Pennsylvania =

Township in Pennsylvania, US

Coordinates: 40°53′07″N 79°14′48″W

- Township
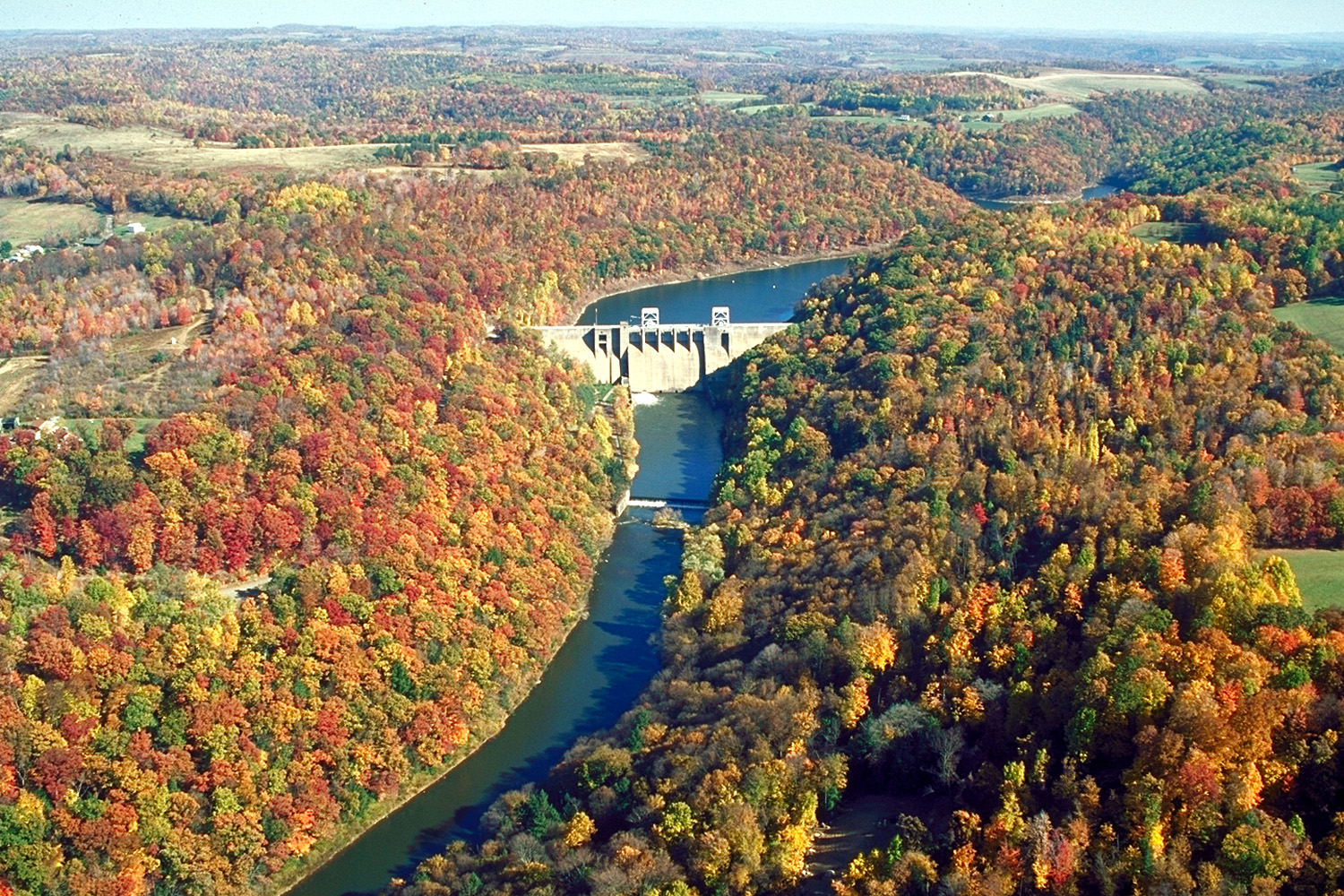
- Mahoning Creek Dam; Wayne Township is to the right

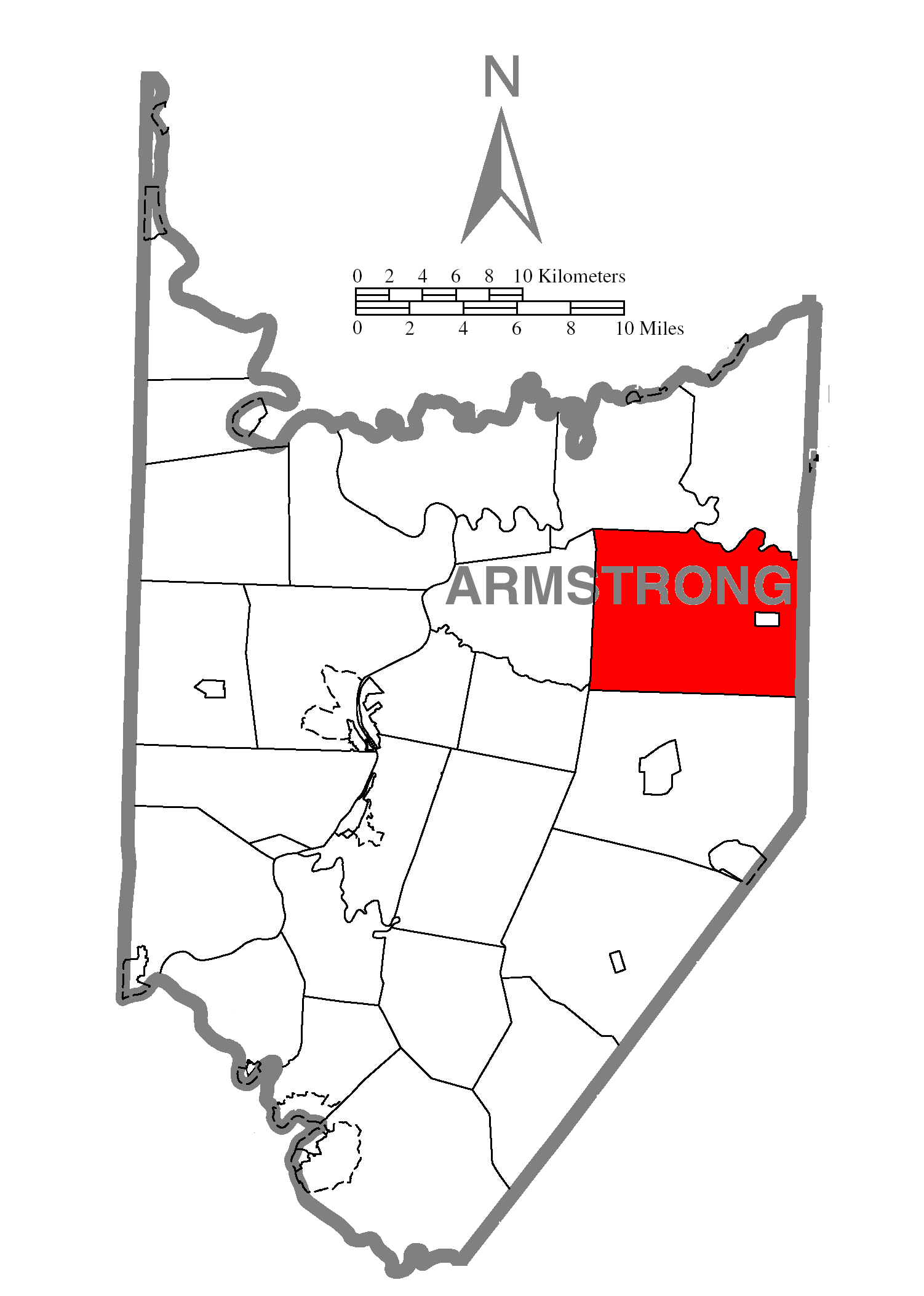
- Map of Armstrong County, Pennsylvania, highlighting Wayne Township

- Map of Armstrong County, Pennsylvania
- Country: United States
- State: Pennsylvania
- County: Armstrong
- Settled: 1800
- Incorporated: 1821

Area
  - Total: 45.01 sq mi (116.58 km^{2})
  - Land: 44.72 sq mi (115.82 km^{2})
  - Water: 0.29 sq mi (0.76 km^{2})

Population (2020)
  - Total: 1,296
  - Estimate (2021): 1,287
  - Density: 25.5/sq mi (9.84/km^{2})
- Time zone: UTC-5 (Eastern (EST))
  - Summer (DST): UTC-4 (EDT)
- FIPS code: 42-005-81720

Wayne Township is a township that is located in Armstrong County, Pennsylvania, United States.

The population was 1,296 at the time of the 2020 census, an increase over the figure of 1,200 that was tabulated in 2010.

== History ==
Wayne Township appears in the 1876 Atlas of Armstrong County, Pennsylvania. Its early history is detailed in Robert Walter Smith's 1883 History of Armstrong County.

=== Cemeteries ===
- Belknap Cemetery
- Concord Presbyterian Church Cemetery
- Dayton Glade Run Cemetery
- Echo Methodist Episcopal Church / White Cemetery
- Jerusalem Cemetery
- McCreas Furnace Cemetery
- Milliron Family Cemetery
- Milton Cemetery
- Saint Michaels Episcopal Cemetery

== Geography ==
Wayne Township is located in northeastern Armstrong County, bordered to the east by Indiana County. Mahoning Creek forms part of its northern border.

The township completely surrounds the borough of Dayton.

According to the United States Census Bureau, the township has a total area of 45.0 square miles (116.6 km^{2}), of which 44.7 square miles (115.8 km^{2}) is land and 0.31 square miles (0.8 km^{2}), or 0.65%, is water.

== Demographics ==
Historical population
Census	Pop.	Note	%±
2010	1,200		—
2020	1,296		8.0%
2021 (est.)	1,287		−0.7%
U.S. Decennial Census

As of the 2000 census, there were 1,117 people, 404 households, and 319 families residing in the township.

The population density was 25.0 people per square mile (9.7/km^{2}). There were 462 housing units at an average density of 10.3/sq mi (4.0/km^{2}).

The racial makeup of the township was 99.28% White, and 0.72% from two or more races.

There were 404 households, out of which 30.4% had children under the age of eighteen living with them; 67.8% were married couples living together, 6.7% had a female householder with no husband present, and 20.8% were non-families. Out of all of the households that were documented, 19.8% were made up of individuals, and 10.9% had someone living alone who was sixty-five years of age or older.

The average household size was 2.76 and the average family size was 3.12.

The township median age of thirty-seven years was significantly less than the county median age of forty years. The distribution by age group was 26.3% of residents who were under the age of eighteen, 7.0% who were aged eighteen to twenty-four, 27.2% who were aged twenty-five to forty-four, 23.8% who were aged forty-five to sixty-four, and 15.7% who were sixty-five years of age or older.

For every one hundred females, there were 103.5 males. For every one hundred females who were aged eighteen or older, there were 102.7 males.

The median income for a household in the township was $31,071, and the median income for a family was $33,882. Males had a median income of $29,125 compared with that of $19,219 for females.

The per capita income for the township was $13,969.

Approximately 8.6% of families and 12.8% of the population were living below the poverty line, including 21.3% of those who were under the age of eighteen and 4.9% of those who were aged sixty-five or older.
