= Bells Mills, Pennsylvania =

Unincorporated community in Pennsylvania, U.S.

Coordinates: 40°57′10″N 78°55′22″W

Bells Mills is an unincorporated community in Jefferson County, in the U.S. state of Pennsylvania.

== History ==
A post office called Bell's Mills was established in 1863, and remained in operation until 1907. The community was named for James H. Bell, who started a mill and kept a store there.
