= West Mahoning Township, Pennsylvania =

Township in Pennsylvania, US

Coordinates: 40°53′00″N 79°07′00″W

- Township
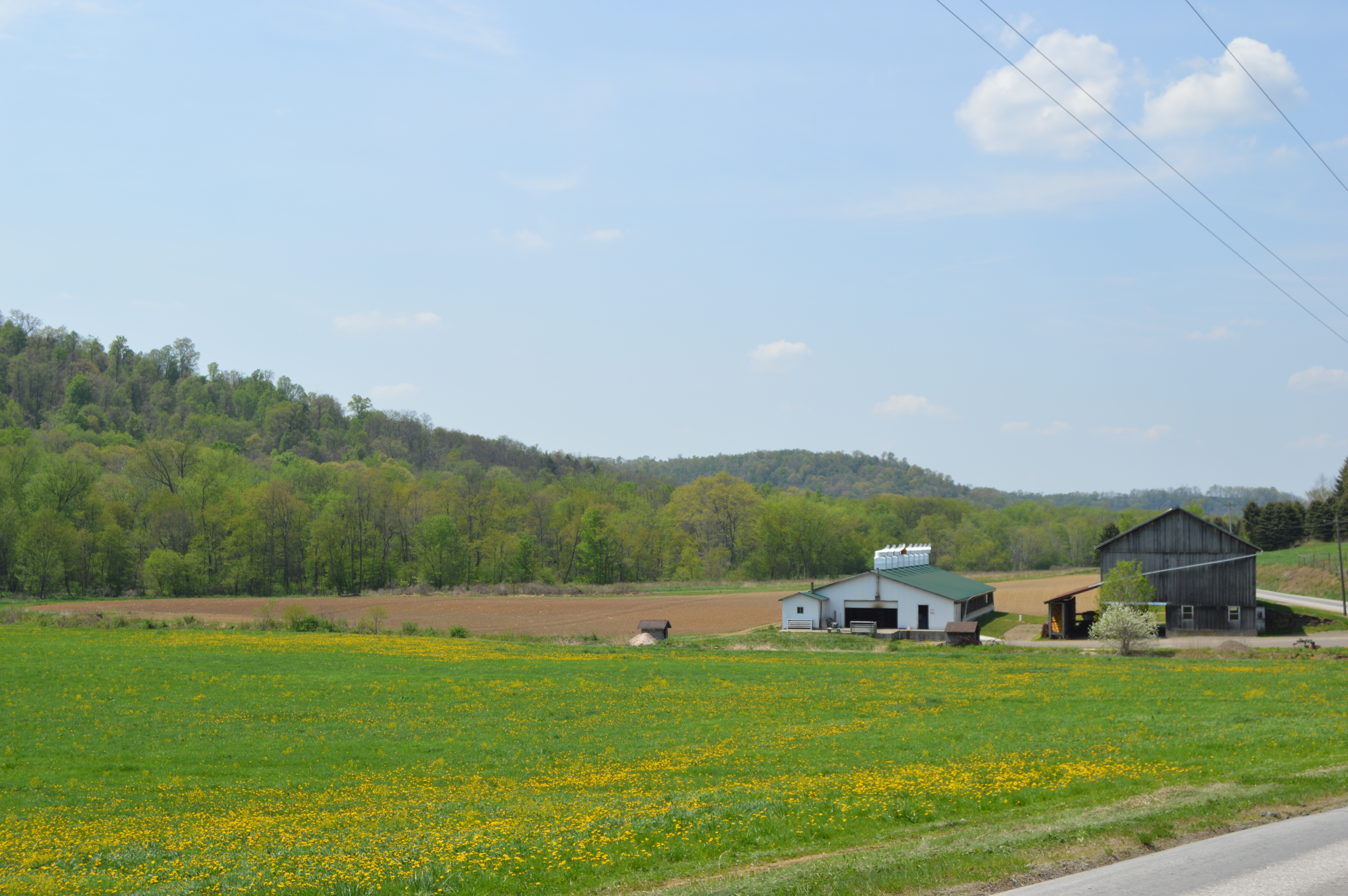
- Fields and a farm on McCormick Road

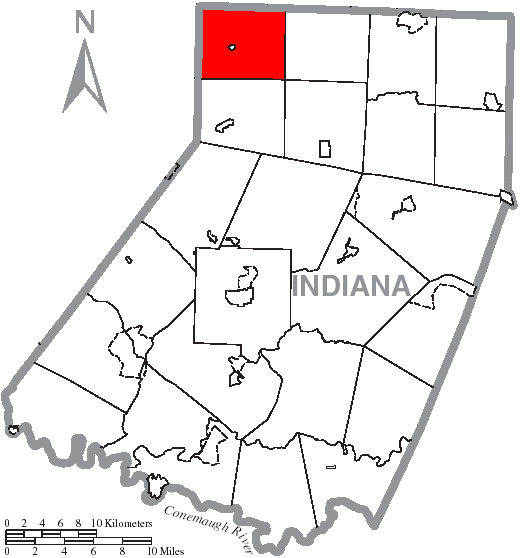
- Map of Indiana County, Pennsylvania Highlighting West Mahoning Township

- Map of Pennsylvania highlighting Indiana County
- Country: United States
- State: Pennsylvania
- County: Indiana

Area
  - Total: 29.36 sq mi (76.04 km^{2})
  - Land: 28.93 sq mi (74.94 km^{2})
  - Water: 0.42 sq mi (1.10 km^{2})

Population (2020)
  - Total: 1,337
  - Estimate (2021): 1,331
  - Density: 44.7/sq mi (17.27/km^{2})
- Time zone: UTC-5 (Eastern (EST))
  - Summer (DST): UTC-4 (EDT)
- FIPS code: 42-063-83416

West Mahoning Township is a township that is located in Indiana County, Pennsylvania, United States. The population was 1,337 at the time of the 2020 census.

The township surrounds Smicksburg, a separately incorporated borough.

== Geography ==
According to the United States Census Bureau, the township has a total area of 29.4 square miles (76.1 km^{2}), all land.

== Demographics ==
Historical population
Census	Pop.	Note	%±
1850	1,030		—
1860	1,175		14.1%
1870	1,131		−3.7%
1880	1,170		3.4%
1890	1,056		−9.7%
1900	948		−10.2%
1910	837		−11.7%
1920	778		−7.0%
1930	674		−13.4%
1940	689		2.2%
1950	472		−31.5%
1960	465		−1.5%
1970	539		15.9%
1980	824		52.9%
1990	1,032		25.2%
2000	1,128		9.3%
2010	1,357		20.3%
2020	1,337		−1.5%
2021 (est.)	1,331		−0.4%
U.S. Decennial Census

As of the census of 2000, there were 1,128 people, 277 households, and 244 families residing in the township.

The population density was 38.4 inhabitants per square mile (14.8/km^{2}). There were 357 housing units at an average density of 12.2/sq mi (4.7/km^{2}).

The racial makeup of the township was 99.38% White, 0.27% African American, 0.18% Native American, 0.09% Asian, and 0.09% from two or more races.

There were 277 households, out of which 55.2% had children who were under the age of eighteen living with them; 80.9% were married couples living together, 6.1% had a female householder with no husband present, and 11.6% were non-families. Out of all of the households that were documented, 10.8% were made up of individuals, and 5.4% had someone living alone who was sixty-five years of age or older.

The average household size was 4.07 and the average family size was 4.44.

Within the township, the population was spread out, with 46.1% of residents who were under the age of 18, 11.7% from 18 to 24, 21.4% from 25 to 44, 12.3% from 45 to 64, and 8.5% who were 65 years of age or older. The median age was 20 years.

For every one hundred females, there were 107.7 males. For every one hundred females who were aged eighteen or older, there were 100.0 males.

The median income for a household in the township was $23,403, and the median income for a family was $24,554. Males had a median income of $22,396 compared with that of $22,188 for females.

The per capita income for the township was $6,907.

Approximately 24.9% of families and 37.7% of the population were living below the poverty line, including 52.6% of those who were under the age of eighteen and 5.7% of those who were aged sixty-five or older.
