= Ringgold, Pennsylvania =

Unincorporated community in Pennsylvania, U.S.

Coordinates: 40°59′41″N 79°10′04″W

Ringgold is an unincorporated community in Jefferson County, in the U.S. state of Pennsylvania.

== History ==
Ringgold was founded around 1847. A post office has been in operation at Ringgold since 1847.
