= Mayport, Pennsylvania =

Unincorporated community in Pennsylvania, US

- Unincorporated community
- Location within Pennsylvania
- Coordinates: 41°02′01″N 79°15′05″W
- Country: United States
- State: Pennsylvania
- County: Clarion
- Township: Redbank
- Elevation: 1,109 ft (338 m)
- Time zone: UTC-5 (Eastern (EST))
  - Summer (DST): UTC-4 (EDT)
- ZIP code: 16240
- Area code: 814
- GNIS feature ID: 1180582

Mayport is an unincorporated community in Clarion County, Pennsylvania, United States. The community is located on Redbank Creek at the Pennsylvania Route 536 bridge, 1.5 miles (2.4 km) upstream of Hawthorn. Mayport has a post office with ZIP code 16240.
