= Young Township, Jefferson County, Pennsylvania =

Township in Pennsylvania, US

Coordinates: 40°55′00″N 78°58′59″W

- Township
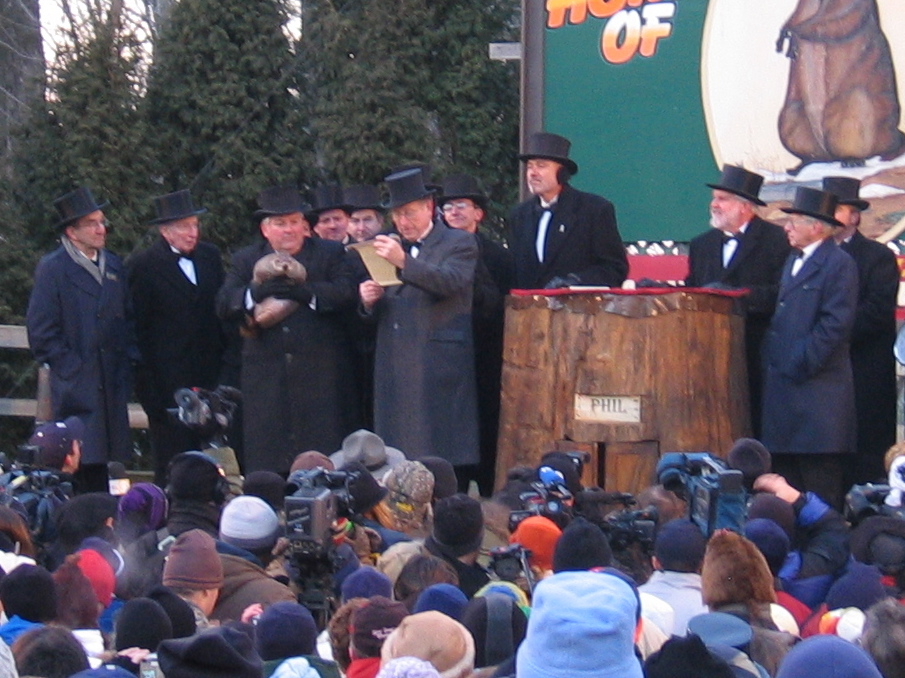
- Punxsutawney Phil emerges on Groundhog Day 2005 in eastern Young Township.

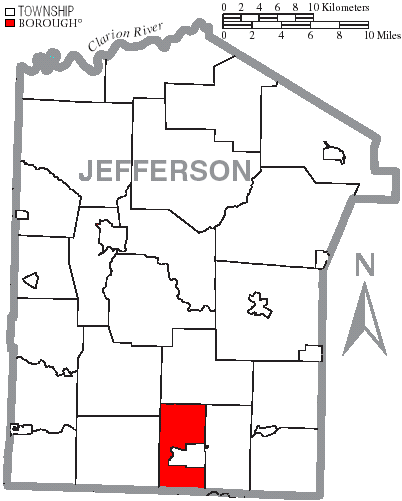
- Map of Jefferson County, Pennsylvania Highlighting Young Township

- Map of Jefferson County, Pennsylvania
- Country: United States
- State: Pennsylvania
- County: Jefferson
- Settled: 1818
- Incorporated: 1826

Government
  - Type: Township of the second class, having a board of three supervisors

Area
  - Total: 15.53 sq mi (40.21 km^{2})
  - Land: 15.44 sq mi (40.00 km^{2})
  - Water: 0.081 sq mi (0.21 km^{2})

Population (2020)
  - Total: 1,716 ▼
  - Estimate (2023): 1,679
  - Density: 111.1/sq mi (42.90/km^{2})
- Time zone: UTC-5 (Eastern (EST))
  - Summer (DST): UTC-4 (EDT)
- FIPS code: 42-065-87168
- Website: www.youngtwpjeff.com

Young Township is a township in Jefferson County, Pennsylvania, United States. The population was 1,716 at the 2020 census. It was named for John Young, the pioneer judge of Westmoreland County. Young Township is the location of adjacent Punxsutawney's Groundhog Day celebration each February 2, during which thousands of attendees and international media outlets visit for an annual weather prediction by the groundhog Punxsutawney Phil. Although named for Punxsutawney, the actual prediction location, Gobbler's Knob, is in Young Township.

== Geography ==
The township is located in southern Jefferson County and borders the borough of Punxsutawney on three sides. The southern boundary of the township is the Indiana County line. U.S. Route 119 passes through the southern part of the township, between Punxsutawney and the county line. Unincorporated communities in the township include Walston, Adrian Mines, Horatio, Sportsburg, Harmony, and Crawfordtown.

According to the United States Census Bureau, the township has a total area of 15.5 square miles (40.2 km^{2}), of which 15.4 square miles (40.0 km^{2}) are land and 0.1 square miles (0.2 km^{2}), or 0.52%, are water. Mahoning Creek, a westward-flowing tributary of the Allegheny River, crosses the central part of the township after leaving Punxsutawney.

== Demographics ==
Historical population
Census	Pop.	Note	%±
1850	1,635		—
1860	776		−52.5%
1870	954		22.9%
1880	909		−4.7%
1890	4,557		401.3%
1900	5,969		31.0%
1910	4,994		−16.3%
1920	4,387		−12.2%
1930	2,289		−47.8%
1940	2,298		0.4%
1950	1,744		−24.1%
1960	1,603		−8.1%
1970	1,370		−14.5%
1980	1,577		15.1%
1990	1,667		5.7%
2000	1,800		8.0%
2010	1,749		−2.8%
2020	1,716		−1.9%
2023 (est.)	1,679		−2.2%
U.S. Decennial Census

As of the 2010 census, there were 1,749 people, 720 households and 508 families residing in the township. The population density was 113.3 inhabitants per square mile (43.7/km^{2}). There were 797 housing units, of which 77, or 9.7%, were vacant. The racial makeup of the township was 98.6% White, 0.3% African American, 0.1% Native American, 0.3% Asian, 0.1% some other race, and 0.6% from two or more races. Hispanic or Latino of any race were 0.3% of the population.

Of the 720 households in the township, 27.6% had children under the age of 18 living with them, 57.2% were headed by married couples living together, 8.3% had a female householder with no husband present, and 29.4% were non-families. 24.6% of all households were made up of individuals, and 12.0% were someone living alone who was 65 years of age or older. The average household size was 2.43, and the average family size was 2.88.

20.2% of the population were under the age of 18, 6.4% were from 18 to 24, 23.7% were from 25 to 44, 33.4% were from 45 to 64, and 16.3% were 65 years of age or older. The median age was 44.7 years. For every 100 females there were 99.4 males. For every 100 females age 18 and over, there were 102.0 males.

For the period 2012–2016, the estimated annual median household income was $50,083 and the median family income was $60,938. Male full-time workers had a median income of $50,781 and females $31,161. The per capita income was $29,743. About 6.8% of families and 11.0% of the population were below the poverty line, including 14.8% of those under age 18 and 4.6% of those age 65 or over.
