= Perry Township, Jefferson County, Pennsylvania =

Township in Pennsylvania, US

Coordinates: 40°56′43″N 79°07′31″W

- Township
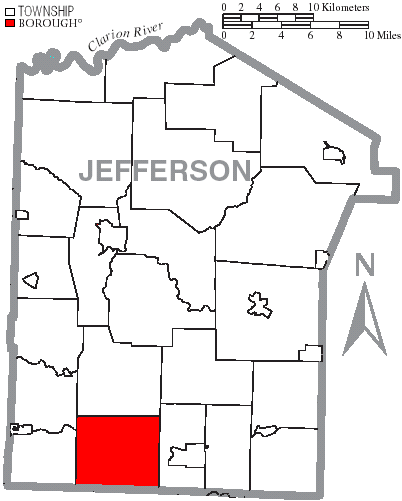
- Map of Jefferson County, Pennsylvania Highlighting Perry Township

- Map of Jefferson County, Pennsylvania
- Country: United States
- State: Pennsylvania
- County: Jefferson
- Settled: 1809
- Incorporated: 1818

Government
  - Type: Township of the Second Class, having a three-member board of supervisors

Area
  - Total: 28.73 sq mi (74.41 km^{2})
  - Land: 28.43 sq mi (73.63 km^{2})
  - Water: 0.30 sq mi (0.78 km^{2})

Population (2020)
  - Total: 1,248 ▲
  - Estimate (2023): 1,222
  - Density: 42.0/sq mi (16.22/km^{2})
- Time zone: UTC-5 (Eastern (EST))
  - Summer (DST): UTC-4 (EDT)
- FIPS code: 42-065-59480

Perry Township is a township in Jefferson County, Pennsylvania, United States. The population was 1,248 at the 2020 census. It was named after Commodore Oliver Hazard Perry.

== Geography ==
The township is in southern Jefferson County and is bordered to the south by Indiana County. It is west of Punxsutawney. According to the United States Census Bureau, the township has a total area of 28.7 square miles (74.4 km^{2}), of which 28.4 square miles (73.6 km^{2}) are land and 0.3 square miles (0.8 km^{2}), or 1.05%, are water. Mahoning Creek, a west-flowing tributary of the Allegheny River, runs through the southern part of the township.

Unincorporated communities in the township include Valier, Fordham, Hamilton, Frostburg, and Grange.

== Demographics ==
Historical population
Census	Pop.	Note	%±
1850	1,738		—
1860	1,073		−38.3%
1870	1,222		13.9%
1880	1,203		−1.6%
1890	1,228		2.1%
1900	1,545		25.8%
1910	1,711		10.7%
1920	1,792		4.7%
1930	1,359		−24.2%
1940	1,626		19.6%
1950	1,355		−16.7%
1960	1,148		−15.3%
1970	1,024		−10.8%
1980	1,257		22.8%
1990	1,293		2.9%
2000	1,289		−0.3%
2010	1,226		−4.9%
2020	1,248		1.8%
2023 (est.)	1,222		−2.1%
U.S. Decennial Census

As of the census of 2000, there were 1,289 people, 498 households, and 369 families residing in the township. The population density was 44.9 inhabitants per square mile (17.3/km^{2}). There were 557 housing units at an average density of 19.4/sq mi (7.5/km^{2}). The racial makeup of the township was 99.61% White, 0.08% Asian, and 0.31% from two or more races.

There were 498 households, out of which 32.3% had children under the age of 18 living with them, 63.5% were married couples living together, 6.2% had a female householder with no husband present, and 25.9% were non-families. 21.7% of all households were made up of individuals, and 11.8% had someone living alone who was 65 years of age or older. The average household size was 2.59 and the average family size was 3.03.

In the township the population was spread out, with 24.3% under the age of 18, 7.4% from 18 to 24, 29.4% from 25 to 44, 23.7% from 45 to 64, and 15.3% who were 65 years of age or older. The median age was 39 years. For every 100 females, there were 107.6 males. For every 100 females age 18 and over, there were 102.5 males.

The median income for a household in the township was $31,595, and the median income for a family was $36,250. Males had a median income of $28,750 versus $20,789 for females. The per capita income for the township was $15,962. About 5.6% of families and 6.8% of the population were below the poverty line, including 5.8% of those under age 18 and 9.7% of those age 65 or over.
