= North Freedom, Pennsylvania =

Unincorporated community in Pennsylvania, U.S.

Coordinates: 41°01′19″N 79°12′35″W

North Freedom is an unincorporated community in Jefferson County, in the U.S. state of Pennsylvania.

== History ==
A post office was established at North Freedom in 1889.
