= Worthville, Pennsylvania =

Borough in Pennsylvania, US

- Borough
- Location of Worthville in Jefferson County, Pennsylvania.

- Location within Pennsylvania Location within the United States
- Coordinates: 41°01′39″N 79°08′21″W
- Country: United States
- State: Pennsylvania
- County: Jefferson

Government
  - Type: Borough Council

Area
  - Total: 0.35 sq mi (0.90 km^{2})
  - Land: 0.34 sq mi (0.88 km^{2})
  - Water: 0.0077 sq mi (0.02 km^{2})
- Elevation: 1,194 ft (364 m)

Population (2020)
  - Total: 80
  - Density: 230.3/sq mi (88.91/km^{2})
- Time zone: UTC-5 (Eastern (EST))
  - Summer (DST): UTC-4 (EDT)
- ZIP code: 15784
- Area code: 814
- FIPS code: 42-86568

Worthville is a borough in Jefferson County, Pennsylvania, United States. As of the 2020 census, Worthville had a population of 80.

The borough is named for General William Jenkins Worth, and is the smallest municipality in Jefferson County.

== History ==
Worthville was originally called "Geistown", and under the latter name, was laid out by Daniel Geist, and then named for him.

The name was changed to Worthville in 1854.

== Notable person ==
Jimmy Slagle, Major League Baseball player, was born in Worthville.

== Geography ==
Worthville is located in southwestern Jefferson County at 41°1′39″N 79°8′21″W (41.027404, -79.139289). It is situated in the valley of Little Sandy Creek, a west-flowing tributary of Redbank Creek and part of the Allegheny River watershed.

According to the United States Census Bureau, the borough has a total area of 0.35 square miles (0.90 km^{2}), of which 0.34 square miles (0.88 km^{2}) are land and 0.01 square miles (0.02 km^{2}), or 2.50%, are water.

== Demographics ==
Historical population
Census	Pop.	Note	%±
1880	174		—
1890	176		1.1%
1900	154		−12.5%
1910	121		−21.4%
1920	91		−24.8%
1930	102		12.1%
1940	105		2.9%
1950	73		−30.5%
1960	83		13.7%
1970	100		20.5%
1980	87		−13.0%
1990	65		−25.3%
2000	85		30.8%
2010	67		−21.2%
2020	80		19.4%

As of the census of 2000, there were eighty-five people, thirty-one households and twenty-four families residing in the borough.

The population density was 463.6 inhabitants per square mile (179.0/km^{2}).

There were thirty-five housing units at an average density of 190.9 per square mile (73.7/km^{2}). The racial makeup of the borough was 95.29% White, and 4.71% from two or more races.

Of the thirty-one households, 35.5% had children under the age of eighteen living with them, 67.7% were married couples living together, 12.9% had a female householder with no husband present, and 19.4% were non-families. 12.9% of all households were made up of individuals, and 6.5% had someone living alone who was sixty-five years of age or older. The average household size was 2.74 and the average family size was 2.88.

In the borough, the population was spread out, with 28.2% under the age of eighteen, 4.7% from eighteen to twenty-four, 28.2% from twenty-five to forty-four, 20.0% from forty-five to sixty-four, and 18.8% who were sixty-five years of age or older. The median age was thirty-six years.

For every one hundred females there were 102.4 males. For every one hundred females aged eighteen and over, there were 96.8 males.

The median income for a household in the borough was $35,625, and the median income for a family was $28,750. Males had a median income of $23,958 versus $16,875 for females. The per capita income for the borough was $14,542.

There were no families and 2.2% of the population living below the poverty line, including no under eighteen and none of those over sixty-four.
