= Frostburg, Pennsylvania =

Unincorporated community in Pennsylvania, U.S.

Coordinates: 40.964451°N 79.031288°W

Frostburg is an unincorporated community in Jefferson County, in the U.S. state of Pennsylvania.

== History ==
A post office was established in the community under the name Frostburgh in 1858. The final "h" was removed in 1892.

== Notable architecture ==
- Frostburg Hopewell United Methodist Church: Celebrating its 175th anniversary in 2019, this church is the oldest church in Jefferson County, Pennsylvania.
