= Redbank Township, Armstrong County, Pennsylvania =

Township in Pennsylvania, US

Coordinates: 40°58′35″N 79°14′40″W

- Township
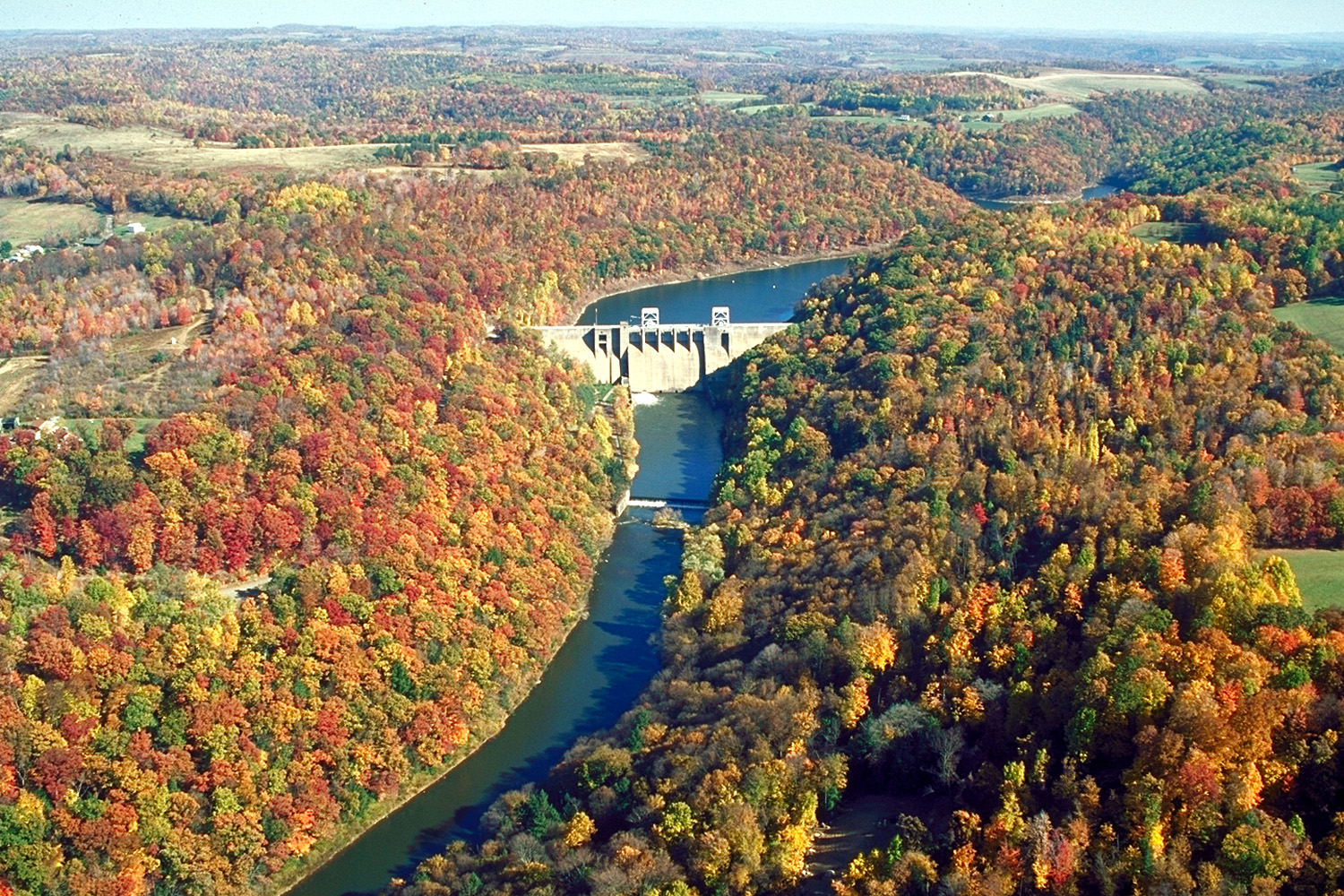
- Mahoning Creek Dam; Redbank Township is to the left

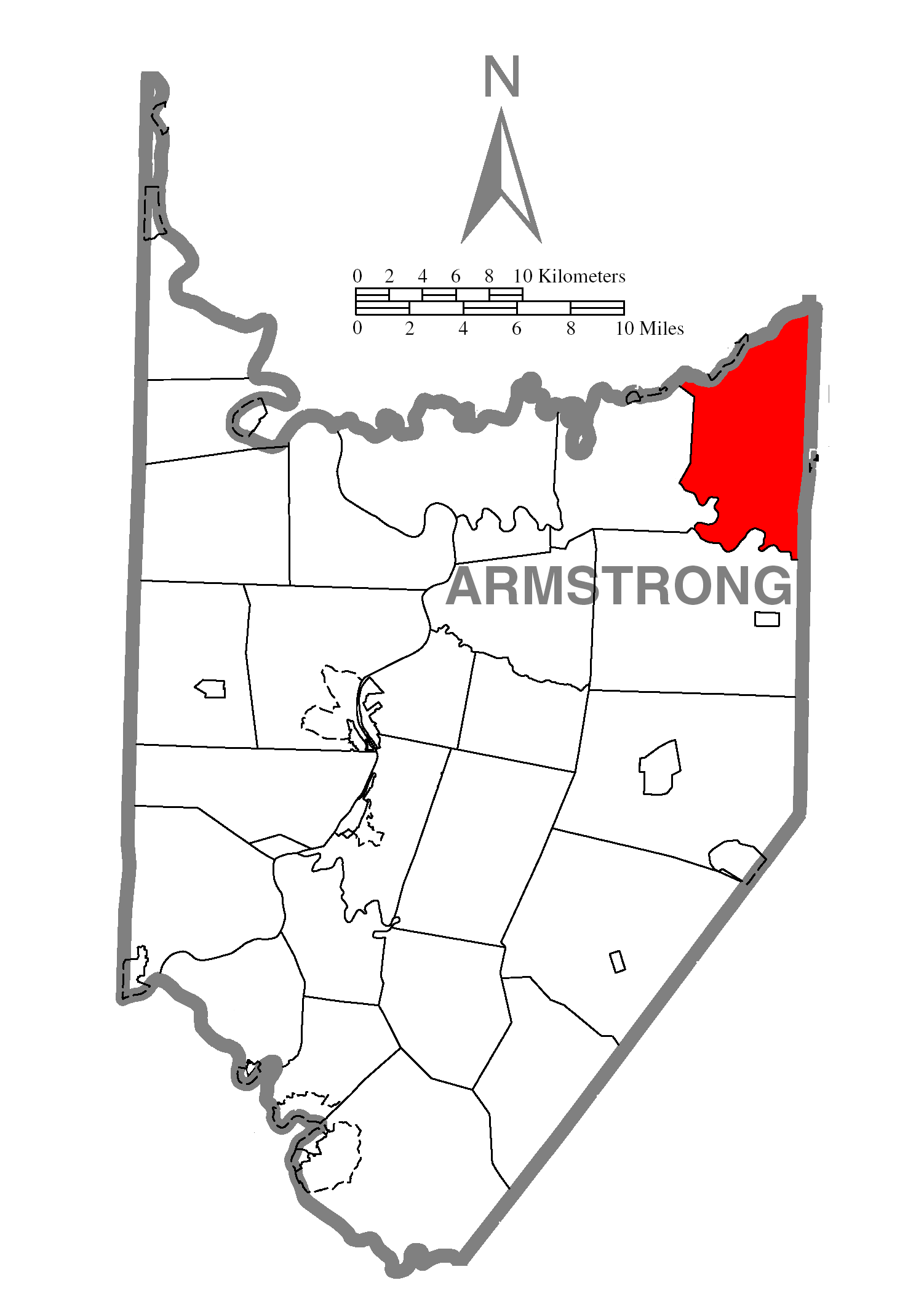
- Map of Armstrong County, Pennsylvania, highlighting Redbank Township

- Map of Armstrong County, Pennsylvania
- Country: United States
- State: Pennsylvania
- County: Armstrong
- Settled: 1807
- Incorporated: 1806

Area
  - Total: 32.59 sq mi (84.41 km^{2})
  - Land: 32.30 sq mi (83.66 km^{2})
  - Water: 0.29 sq mi (0.75 km^{2})

Population (2020)
  - Total: 975
  - Estimate (2021): 968
  - Density: 31.5/sq mi (12.16/km^{2})
- Time zone: UTC-5 (Eastern (EST))
  - Summer (DST): UTC-4 (EDT)
- FIPS code: 42-005-63712

Redbank Township is a township in Armstrong County, Pennsylvania, United States. The population was 975 at the 2020 census, a decrease from the figure of 1,064 tabulated in 2010.

== Geography ==
Redbank Township is located in the northeastern corner of Armstrong County. Redbank Creek forms the northern boundary of the township (and the Clarion County boundary), and Mahoning Creek forms the southern boundary. The eastern boundary is with Jefferson County and a small portion of Indiana County. To the west is Mahoning Township of Armstrong County.

According to the United States Census Bureau, the township has a total area of 32.6 square miles (84.4 km^{2}), of which 32.3 square miles (83.7 km^{2}) is land and 0.27 square miles (0.7 km^{2}), or 0.89%, is water.

== Demographics ==
Historical population
Census	Pop.	Note	%±
2010	1,064		—
2020	975		−8.4%
2021 (est.)	968		−0.7%
U.S. Decennial Census

As of the 2000 census, there were 1,296 people, 435 households, and 331 families residing in the township. The population density was 40.1 inhabitants per square mile (15.5/km^{2}). There were 510 housing units at an average density of 15.8/sq mi (6.1/km^{2}). The racial makeup of the township was 99.07% White, 0.15% African American, 0.08% Native American, 0.08% from other races, and 0.62% from two or more races. Hispanic or Latino of any race were 0.46% of the population.

There were 435 households, out of which 35.2% had children under the age of 18 living with them, 62.8% were married couples living together, 10.3% had a female householder with no husband present, and 23.7% were non-families. 20.0% of all households were made up of individuals, and 10.1% had someone living alone who was 65 years of age or older. The average household size was 2.65 and the average family size was 3.05.

The township median age of 40 years was the same as the county median age of 40 years. The distribution by age group was 23.8% under the age of 18, 6.6% from 18 to 24, 27.7% from 25 to 44, 21.3% from 45 to 64, and 20.6% who were 65 years of age or older. The median age was 40 years. For every 100 females there were 86.2 males. For every 100 females age 18 and over, there were 83.8 males.

The median income for a household in the township was $30,121, and the median income for a family was $33,625. Males had a median income of $26,848 versus $20,188 for females. The per capita income for the township was $12,384. About 10.9% of families and 14.8% of the population were below the poverty line, including 18.4% of those under age 18 and 7.0% of those age 65 or over.

== History ==
Red Bank Township appears in the 1876 Atlas of Armstrong County, Pennsylvania. Its early history is detailed in Robert Walter Smith's 1883 History of Armstrong County.

== Cemeteries ==
- Copenhaver Crossroads Cemetery
- Emmanuel Evangelical Lutheran Cemetery
- Mount Tabor Cemetery
- Mudlic Cemetery
- New Salem Cemetery
- Trinity Reformed Cemetery
