= McCalmont Township, Pennsylvania =

Township in Pennsylvania, US

Coordinates: 40°59′59″N 78°57′59″W

- Township
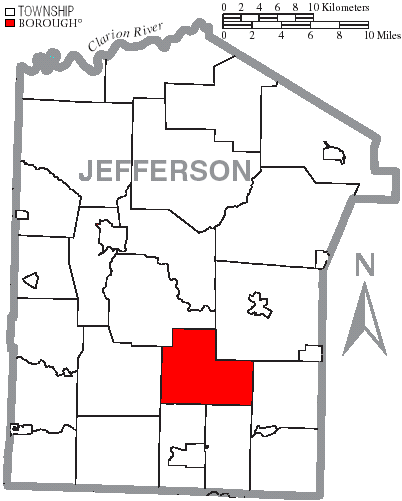
- Map of Jefferson County, Pennsylvania Highlighting McCalmont Township

- Map of Jefferson County, Pennsylvania
- Country: United States
- State: Pennsylvania
- County: Jefferson
- Settled: 1830
- Incorporated: 1857

Government
  - Type: Township of the Second Class, having a three-member board of supervisors

Area
  - Total: 26.28 sq mi (68.07 km^{2})
  - Land: 26.25 sq mi (67.98 km^{2})
  - Water: 0.035 sq mi (0.09 km^{2})

Population (2020)
  - Total: 1,136 ▲
  - Estimate (2023): 1,115
  - Density: 43.28/sq mi (16.71/km^{2})
- Time zone: UTC-5 (Eastern (EST))
  - Summer (DST): UTC-4 (EDT)
- FIPS code: 42-065-45888

McCalmont Township is a township in Jefferson County, Pennsylvania, United States. The population was 1,136 at the 2020 census. It was named for John Swayze McCalmont, president judge of the county at the time.

== Geography ==
The township is in southeastern Jefferson County, north of Punxsutawney and southwest of Reynoldsville. According to the United States Census Bureau, the township has a total area of 26.3 square miles (68.1 km^{2}), of which 0.03 square miles (0.09 km^{2}), or 0.13%, are water. The township contains the unincorporated communities of Anita, Panic, Cortez, and Battle Hollow.

== Demographics ==
Historical population
Census	Pop.	Note	%±
1860	454		—
1870	483		6.4%
1880	549		13.7%
1890	1,031		87.8%
1900	5,121		396.7%
1910	4,785		−6.6%
1920	3,290		−31.2%
1930	1,405		−57.3%
1940	1,521		8.3%
1950	1,305		−14.2%
1960	1,052		−19.4%
1970	978		−7.0%
1980	1,089		11.3%
1990	1,006		−7.6%
2000	1,068		6.2%
2010	1,082		1.3%
2020	1,136		5.0%
2023 (est.)	1,115		−1.8%
U.S. Decennial Census

At the 2000 census there were 1,068 people, 391 households, and 297 families in the township. The population density was 40.6 inhabitants per square mile (15.7/km^{2}). There were 462 housing units at an average density of 17.5/sq mi (6.8/km^{2}). The racial makeup of the township was 98.60% White, 0.19% African American, 0.37% from other races, and 0.84% from two or more races. Hispanic or Latino of any race were 0.37%.

There were 391 households, 33.0% had children under the age of 18 living with them, 62.1% were married couples living together, 7.2% had a female householder with no husband present, and 24.0% were non-families. 20.7% of households were made up of individuals, and 9.7% were one person aged 65 or older. The average household size was 2.65 and the average family size was 3.06.

In the township the population was spread out, with 25.7% under the age of 18, 6.9% from 18 to 24, 28.4% from 25 to 44, 24.7% from 45 to 64, and 14.3% 65 or older. The median age was 38 years. For every 100 females, there were 96.0 males. For every 100 females age 18 and over, there were 98.0 males.

The median household income was $34,306 and the median family income was $38,182. Males had a median income of $31,400 versus $20,833 for females. The per capita income for the township was $17,083. About 6.7% of families and 11.3% of the population were below the poverty line, including 22.1% of those under age 18 and 2.8% of those age 65 or over.
