= Banks Township, Indiana County, Pennsylvania =

Township in Pennsylvania, US

Coordinates: 40°53′00″N 78°52′00″W

- Township
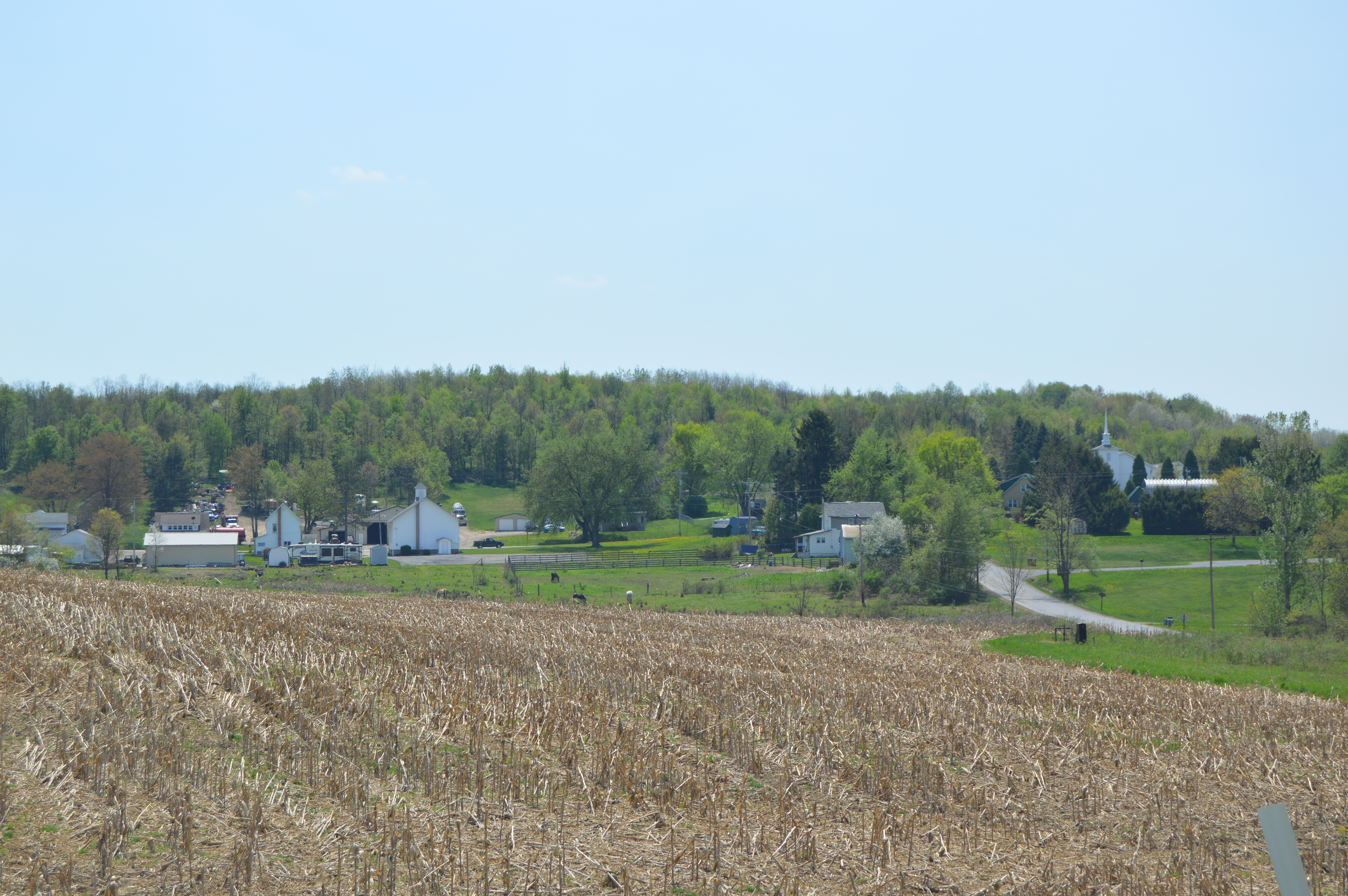
- Fields and houses at Smithport

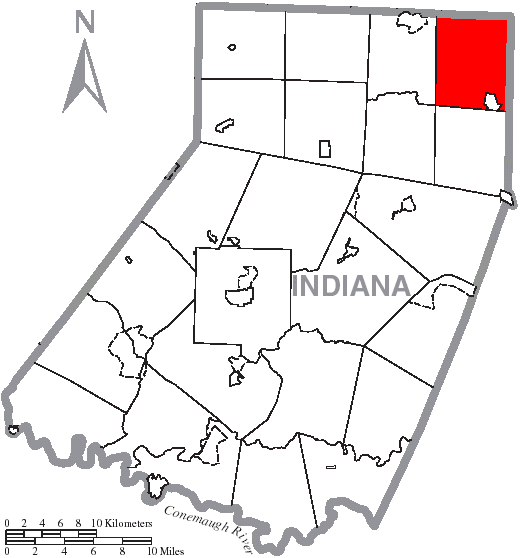
- Map of Indiana County, Pennsylvania, highlighting Banks Township

- Map of Pennsylvania highlighting Indiana County
- Country: United States
- State: Pennsylvania
- County: Indiana

Area
  - Total: 31.87 sq mi (82.53 km^{2})
  - Land: 31.75 sq mi (82.22 km^{2})
  - Water: 0.12 sq mi (0.31 km^{2})

Population (2020)
  - Total: 914 ▼
  - Estimate (2021): 909
  - Density: 30.5/sq mi (11.77/km^{2})
- Time zone: UTC-5 (Eastern (EST))
  - Summer (DST): UTC-4 (EDT)
- FIPS code: 42-063-04056

Banks Township is a township in Indiana County, Pennsylvania, United States. The population was 914 at the 2020 census. It was named after William Banks, a well-known Indiana attorney. It contains the communities of Flora, Horton (previously Smithport), Johnsonburg, Keal Run, Lochvale, Madeline, Raytown, Smithville, and Urey.

== Geography ==
According to the United States Census Bureau, the township has a total area of 31.87 square miles (82.5 km^{2}), of which 31.75 square miles (82.2 km^{2}) is land and .12 square miles (0.31 km^{2}) is water. Hemlock Lake is located in the east, and State Game Lands Number 174 is in the extreme northeast.

== Demographics ==
Historical population
Census	Pop.	Note	%±
1870	747		—
1880	919		23.0%
1890	1,485		61.6%
1900	1,798		21.1%
1910	1,872		4.1%
1920	2,273		21.4%
1930	1,356		−40.3%
1940	1,348		−0.6%
1950	1,269		−5.9%
1960	975		−23.2%
1970	979		0.4%
1980	1,084		10.7%
1990	995		−8.2%
2000	997		0.2%
2010	1,018		2.1%
2020	914		−10.2%
2021 (est.)	909		−0.5%
U.S. Decennial Census

As of the 2000 census, there were 997 people, 368 households, and 274 families residing in the township. The population density was 31.3 inhabitants per square mile (12.1/km^{2}). There were 456 housing units at an average density of 14.3/sq mi (5.5/km^{2}). The racial makeup of the township was 98.40% White, 0.10% Native American, 0.40% Asian, 0.30% from other races, and 0.80% from two or more races. Hispanic or Latino of any race were 0.30% of the population.

There were 368 households, out of which 29.3% had children under the age of 18 living with them, 63.6% were married couples living together, 5.4% had a female householder with no husband present, and 25.3% were non-families. 21.5% of all households were made up of individuals, and 13.0% had someone living alone who was 65 years of age or older. The average household size was 2.60 and the average family size was 3.00.

In the township the population was spread out, with 22.8% under the age of 18, 7.3% from 18 to 24, 27.1% from 25 to 44, 24.5% from 45 to 64, and 18.4% who were 65 years of age or older. The median age was 40 years. For every 100 females there were 109.0 males. For every 100 females age 18 and over, there were 107.0 males.

The median income for a household in the township was $28,938, and the median income for a family was $34,550. Males had a median income of $27,625 versus $16,250 for females. The per capita income for the township was $14,687. About 12.5% of families and 16.5% of the population were below the poverty line, including 25.5% of those under age 18 and 5.5% of those age 65 or over.
