= Timblin, Pennsylvania =

Borough in Pennsylvania, US

- Borough
- Location of Timblin in Jefferson County, Pennsylvania.

- Location within Pennsylvania Location within the United States
- Coordinates: 40°57′58″N 79°12′02″W
- Country: United States
- State: Pennsylvania
- County: Jefferson

Government
  - Type: Borough Council

Area
  - Total: 0.91 sq mi (2.35 km^{2})
  - Land: 0.90 sq mi (2.34 km^{2})
  - Water: 0.0039 sq mi (0.01 km^{2})
- Elevation: 1,224 ft (373 m)

Population (2020)
  - Total: 147
  - Density: 162.7/sq mi (62.82/km^{2})
- Time zone: UTC-5 (Eastern (EST))
  - Summer (DST): UTC-4 (EDT)
- ZIP code: 15778
- Area code: 814
- FIPS code: 42-76744
- Website: https://www.timblinboro.org/

Timblin is a borough in Jefferson County, Pennsylvania, United States. As of the 2020 census, Timblin had a population of 147.

== History ==
The community which would later be named as "Timblin" had its genesis in the arrival, during the early 1800s, of several pioneer settlers in Perry Township: James McClelland (1803), Benjamin Ions (1804), David Hamilton (1806). Elijah Ekis, Michael Lantz and William Smith then arrived in 1815. In 1843, Smith relocated with his sons to land that would later become part of Timblin. The town's name, according to The Brookville American, would subsequently be chosen to honor Andy Timblin, the town's postmaster during the mid-1880s. Timblin's father, A. Timblin, had built a log cabin, in or before 1840, near the same area where the Smith family had settled, and had then begun farming the land there.

Timblin got its start as a true town circa 1883, when John A. Timblin opened a store at the site. A post office called Timblin was established in 1889.

The town grew quickly, following the 1910 completion nearby of an extension of the Pittsburg, Shawmut & Northern Railroad. This later became the Pittsburgh & Shawmut Railroad, and eventually was operated by the Buffalo & Pittsburgh Railroad until the tracks were removed in 2006.

In 1913, the Timblin Coal Company began its operations.

The First National Bank of Timblin was incorporated in 1918 and opened to customers. Nine thousand dollars was deposited on that first day.

In 1921, Joe Cosmano opened Cosmano's Restaurant, a soft drink and confectionary business.

On August 1, 1922, a furniture store and a clothing store opened.

The town then became a borough following a special election held for Timblin residents on January 30, 1923.

== Geography ==
The Armstrong County line forms the western border of the borough.

According to the United States Census Bureau, the borough has a total area of 0.95 square miles (2.47 km^{2}), of which 1.7 acres (7,036 m^{2}), or 0.28%, are water. Timblin is in the valley of Pine Run, a west-flowing tributary of Mahoning Creek, part of the Allegheny River watershed. Two streams join Pine Run from the north in Timblin: Eagle Run, and Painter Run.

== Demographics ==
Historical population
Census	Pop.	Note	%±
1930	431		—
1940	454		5.3%
1950	327		−28.0%
1960	240		−26.6%
1970	218		−9.2%
1980	197		−9.6%
1990	165		−16.2%
2000	151		−8.5%
2010	157		4.0%
2020	147		−6.4%
U.S. Decennial Census

As of the census of 2000, there were 151 people, 58 households, and 45 families residing in the borough. The population density was 166.4 inhabitants per square mile (64.2/km^{2}). There were 72 housing units at an average density of 79.4 units per square mile (30.7 units/km^{2}). The racial makeup of the borough was 98.68% White, 0.66% from other races, and 0.66% from two or more races. Hispanic or Latino of any race were 1.99% of the population.

There were 58 households, out of which 34.5% had children under the age of 18 living with them, 65.5% were married couples living together, 6.9% had a female householder with no husband present, and 20.7% were non-families. 19.0% of all households were made up of individuals, and 8.6% had someone living alone who was 65 years of age or older. The average household size was 2.60 and the average family size was 2.96.

In the borough the population was spread out, with 27.2% under the age of 18, 6.0% from 18 to 24, 32.5% from 25 to 44, 17.2% from 45 to 64, and 17.2% who were 65 years of age or older. The median age was 37 years. For every 100 females there were 98.7 males. For every 100 females age 18 and over, there were 103.7 males.

The median income for a household in the borough was $30,625, and the median income for a family was $35,139. Males had a median income of $29,219 versus $38,125 for females. The per capita income for the borough was $14,831. None of the families and 4.6% of the population were living below the poverty line, including no under eighteens and 9.8% of those over 64.
