= Big Run, Jefferson County, Pennsylvania =

Borough in Pennsylvania, US

Big Run, Pennsylvania
- Borough
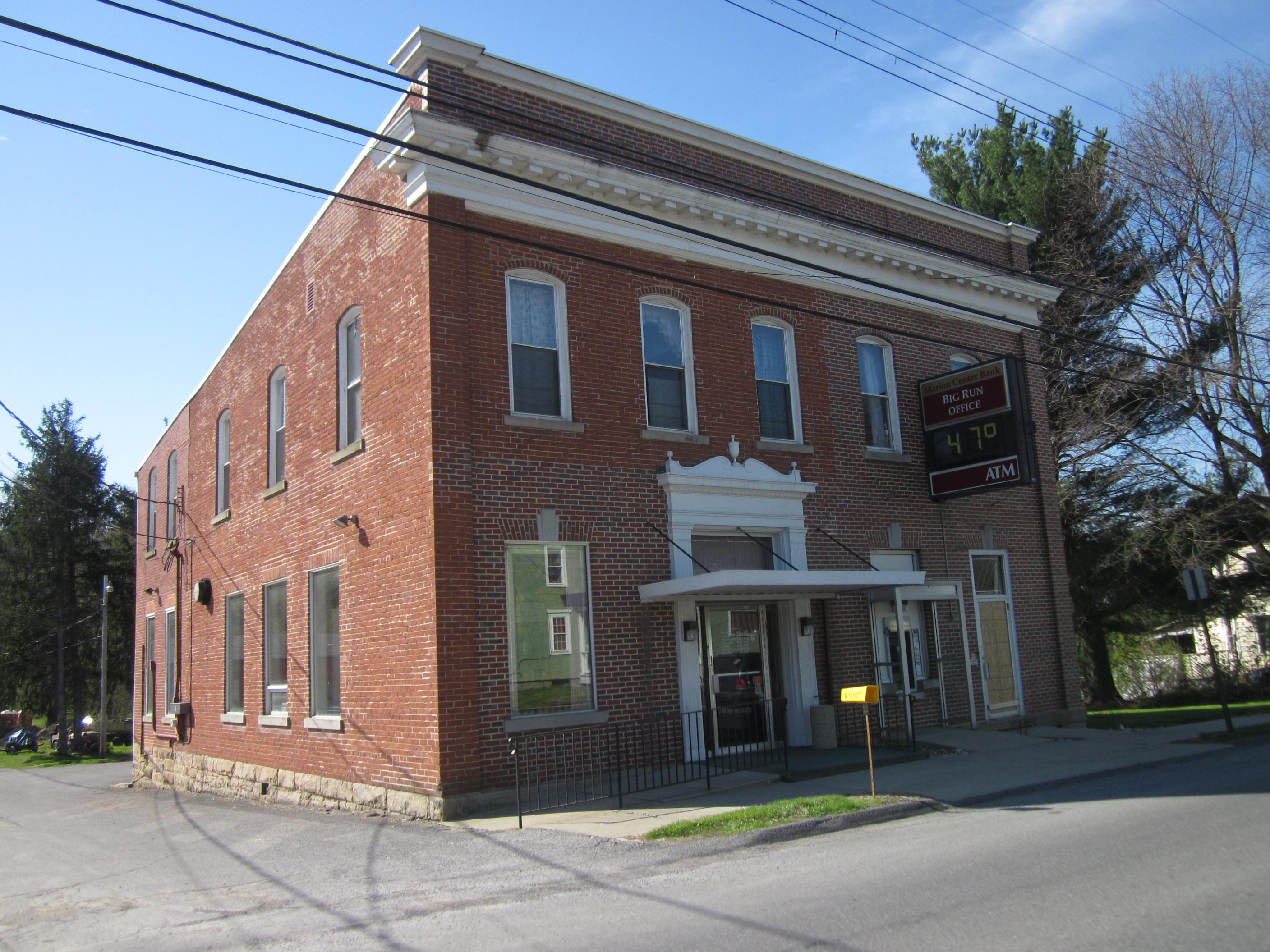
- Big Run, Pennsylvania

- Location of Big Run in Jefferson County, Pennsylvania

- Location within Pennsylvania
- Coordinates: 40°58′12″N 78°52′40″W
- Country: United States
- State: Pennsylvania
- County: Jefferson
- Settled: 1822
- Incorporated: 1867

Government
  - Type: Borough Council

Area
  - Total: 0.71 sq mi (1.84 km^{2})
  - Land: 0.69 sq mi (1.79 km^{2})
  - Water: 0.019 sq mi (0.05 km^{2})
- Elevation: 1,289 ft (393 m)

Population (2020)
  - Total: 647
  - Density: 936/sq mi (361.3/km^{2})
- Time zone: UTC-5 (Eastern (EST))
  - Summer (DST): UTC-4 (EDT)
- ZIP code: 15715
- Area code: 814
- FIPS code: 42-06344
- GNIS feature ID: 1215297

Big Run is a borough in Jefferson County, Pennsylvania, United States. The population was 624 at the 2010 census, a decline from the figure of 686 tabulated in 2000. The borough was named for the waterway of the same name.

== Geography ==
Big Run is located in southeastern Jefferson County at 40°58′12″N 78°52′40″W (40.969945, -78.877848), on the north side of Mahoning Creek, a westward-flowing tributary of the Allegheny River. The borough is named for Big Run, which joins Mahoning Creek at the western end of the community.

U.S. Route 119 passes through the center of town, leading northeast 13 miles (21 km) to DuBois and southwest 6 miles (10 km) to Punxsutawney.

According to the United States Census Bureau, the borough of Big Run has a total area of 0.71 square miles (1.84 km^{2}), of which 0.02 square miles (0.05 km^{2}), or 2.69%, are water.

== Demographics ==
Historical population
Census	Pop.	Note	%±
1870	206		—
1880	240		16.5%
1890	731		204.6%
1900	879		20.2%
1910	1,032		17.4%
1920	1,023		−0.9%
1930	795		−22.3%
1940	963		21.1%
1950	896		−7.0%
1960	857		−4.4%
1970	826		−3.6%
1980	822		−0.5%
1990	699		−15.0%
2000	686		−1.9%
2010	624		−9.0%
2020	647		3.7%

As of the census of 2000, there were 686 people, 282 households, and 194 families residing in the borough. The population density was 965.9 inhabitants per square mile (372.9/km^{2}). There were 307 housing units at an average density of 432.3 per square mile (166.9/km^{2}). The racial makeup of the borough was 98.54% White, 0.58% Native American, 0.44% from other races, and 0.44% from two or more races. Hispanic or Latino of any race were 0.15% of the population.

There were 282 households, out of which 30.1% had children under the age of 18 living with them, 53.2% were married couples living together, 9.6% had a female householder with no husband present, and 31.2% were non-families. 26.2% of all households were made up of individuals, and 11.0% had someone living alone who was 65 years of age or older. The average household size was 2.38 and the average family size was 2.85.

In the borough the population was spread out, with 25.8% under the age of 18, 6.4% from 18 to 24, 27.8% from 25 to 44, 22.9% from 45 to 64, and 17.1% who were 65 years of age or older. The median age was 37 years. For every 100 females there were 99.4 males. For every 100 females age 18 and over, there were 96.5 males.

The median income for a household in the borough was $27,500, and the median income for a family was $31,111. Males had a median income of $27,216 versus $17,917 for females. The per capita income for the borough was $12,363. About 8.1% of families and 11.2% of the population were below the poverty line, including 21.0% of those under age 18 and none of those age 65 or over.
