= Oliver Township, Jefferson County, Pennsylvania =

Township in Pennsylvania, US

Coordinates: 41°01′19″N 79°03′55″W

- Township
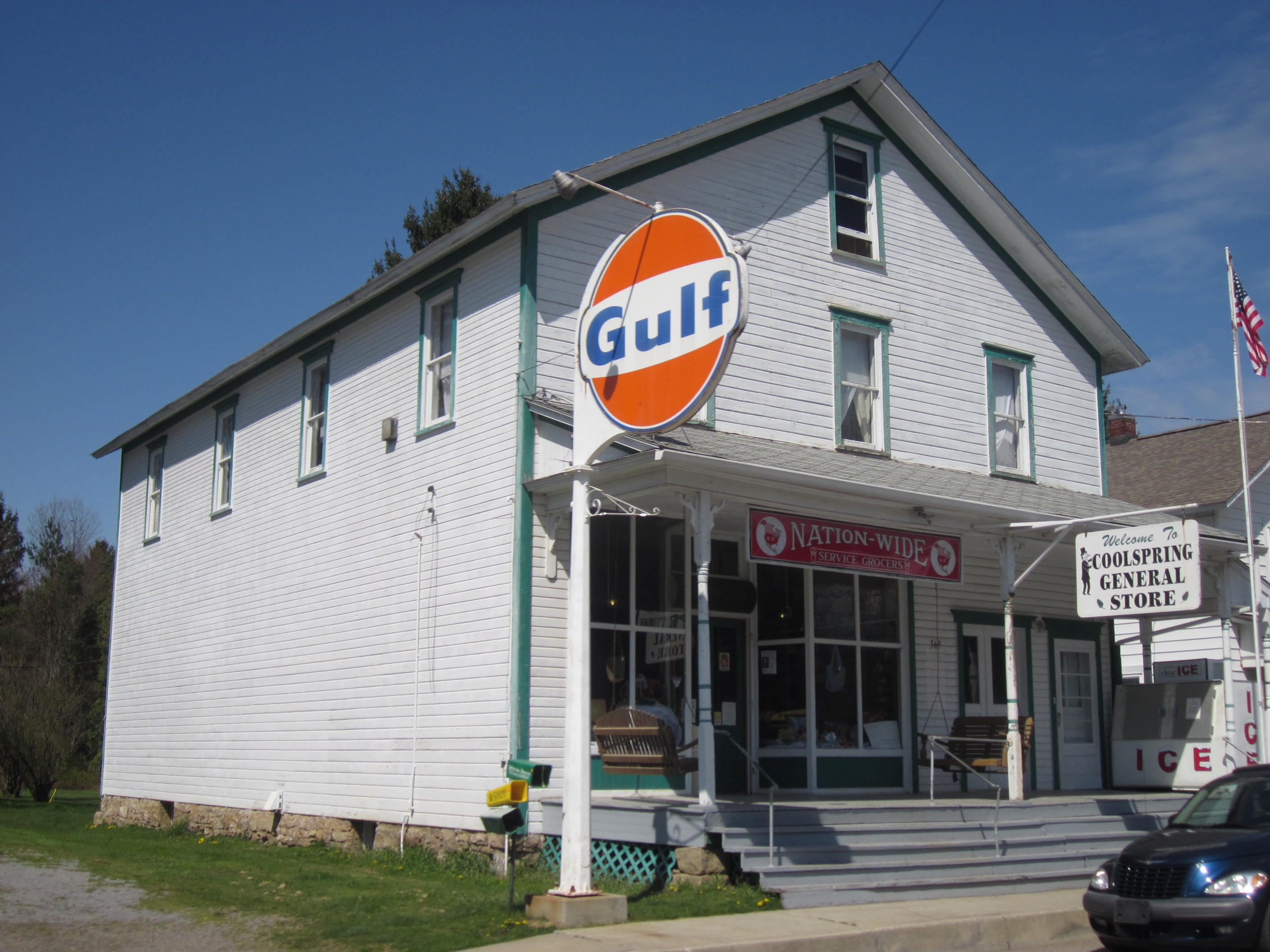
- Coolspring General Store

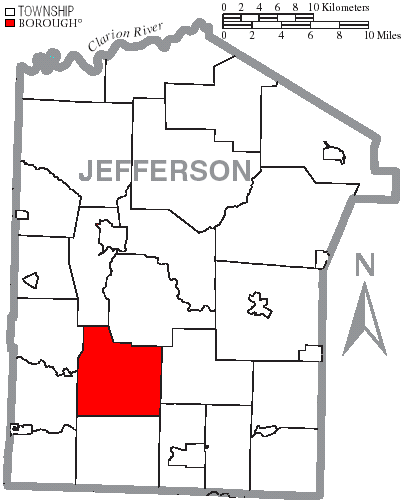
- Map of Jefferson County, Pennsylvania, highlighting Oliver Township

- Map of Jefferson County, Pennsylvania
- Country: United States
- State: Pennsylvania
- County: Jefferson
- Settled: 1822
- Incorporated: 1851

Government
  - Type: Township of the Second Class, having a three-member board of supervisors

Area
  - Total: 30.12 sq mi (78.00 km^{2})
  - Land: 30.02 sq mi (77.76 km^{2})
  - Water: 0.093 sq mi (0.24 km^{2})

Population (2020)
  - Total: 1,006
  - Estimate (2023): 988
  - Density: 33.51/sq mi (12.94/km^{2})
- Time zone: UTC-5 (Eastern (EST))
  - Summer (DST): UTC-4 (EDT)
- FIPS code: 42-065-56712

Oliver Township is a township in Jefferson County, Pennsylvania, United States. The population was 1,006 at the 2020 census. It was named after Commodore Oliver Hazard Perry.

== Geography ==
The township is in southwestern Jefferson County, south of Brookville and northwest of Punxsutawney. According to the United States Census Bureau, the township has a total area of 30.1 square miles (78.0 km^{2}), of which 30.0 square miles (77.8 km^{2}) are land and 0.1 square miles (0.2 km^{2}), or 0.31%, are water. Little Sandy Creek, a tributary of Redbank Creek, flows from east to west through the center of the township. The entire township is part of the Allegheny River watershed.

The township contains the unincorporated communities of Oliveburg, Sprankle Mills, Coolspring, Markton, East Branch, and Coulter.

== Demographics ==
Historical population
| Census | Pop. | Note | %± |
|---|---|---|---|
| 1860 | 977 | | — |
| 1870 | 1,117 | | 14.3% |
| 1880 | 1,305 | | 16.8% |
| 1890 | 1,362 | | 4.4% |
| 1900 | 1,455 | | 6.8% |
| 1910 | 1,417 | | −2.6% |
| 1920 | 1,210 | | −14.6% |
| 1930 | 1,174 | | −3.0% |
| 1940 | 993 | | −15.4% |
| 1950 | 958 | | −3.5% |
| 1960 | 899 | | −6.2% |
| 1970 | 955 | | 6.2% |
| 1980 | 1,199 | | 25.5% |
| 1990 | 1,119 | | −6.7% |
| 2000 | 1,129 | | 0.9% |
| 2010 | 1,083 | | −4.1% |
| 2020 | 1,006 | | −7.1% |
| 2023 (est.) | 988 | | −1.8% |
U.S. Decennial Census

At the 2010 census, there were 1,083 people, 444 households and 341 families residing in the township. The population density was 36.1 inhabitants per square mile (13.9/km^{2}). There were 544 housing units, of which 100, or 18.4%, were vacant. 76 of the vacant units were for seasonal or recreational use. The racial makeup of the township was 98.4% White, 0% African American, 0.1% Native American, 0.6% Asian, 0.5% some other race, and 0.5% from two or more races. Hispanic or Latino of any race were 0.5% of the population.

Of the 444 households in the township, 27.5% had children under the age of 18 living with them, 64.0% were headed by married couples living together, 7.7% had a female householder with no husband present, and 23.2% were non-families. 21.8% of all households were made up of individuals, and 9.2% were someone living alone who was 65 years of age or older. The average household size was 2.44, and the average family size was 2.80.

19.0% of the population were under the age of 18, 6.8% were from 18 to 24, 23.7% from 25 to 44, 31.8% from 45 to 64, and 18.5% were 65 years of age or older. The median age was 45.2 years. For every 100 females, there were 104.7 males. For every 100 females age 18 and over, there were 102.5 males.

For the period 2012–2016, the estimated annual median household income was $56,063 and the median family income was $62,167. Male full-time workers had a median income of $46,518 and females $32,917. The per capita income was $26,685. About 1.7% of families and 2.8% of the population were below the poverty line, including 1.6% of those under age 18 and 0.% of those age 65 or over.
