= Dora =

Dora may refer to:

== Arts and entertainment ==
=== Television ===
- Dora (Dora the Explorer), a fictional character in the Dora the Explorer franchise
  - Dora the Explorer (TV series), 2000–2019
  - Dora (TV series), a 2024 reboot of the original series
- Dora, series 2 of the 1973 British sitcom Both Ends Meet

=== Film ===
- Dora (1933 film), a British comedy
- Dora or the Sexual Neuroses of Our Parents, a 2015 Swiss drama
- Dora (2017 film), a Tamil horror thriller
- Dora (2026 film), a drama film by July Jung
- Dora the Explorer (film), films from the franchise from 2019 and 2025
- Dora, fictional tribal chieftains in the 2023 Indian film Salaar

=== Other uses in arts and entertainment ===
- Dora Mavor Moore Awards, or the Doras, by the Toronto Alliance for the Performing Arts
- Dora: A Headcase, a 2012 novel about Freud's patient (see below)
- "Dora", a song by Ambitious Lovers from the 1984 album Envy
- Dora, bonus tiles in Japanese mahjong
- Dora festival, selection event for Croatia in the Eurovision Song Contest

== Military ==
- Dora, the name of a Schwerer Gustav World War II railway gun
- Dora I, and Dora II, German U-boat bases in Trondheim, Norway
- Dora, nickname of the Focke-Wulf Fw 190D German fighter aircraft

== People and fictional characters ==
- Dora (given name), including a list of people and fictional characters
- Dora (case study), pseudonym given by Sigmund Freud to Ida Bauer (1882–1945), a patient he treated
- Sister Dora, Anglican nun and nurse Dorothy Wyndlow Pattison (1832–1878)
- Dora d'Istria, pen name of Duchess Helena Koltsova-Massalskaya (1828–1888), Romanian Romantic writer and feminist
- Dora, code name of Alexander Radó (1899–1981), Hungarian World War II Soviet spy

== Places ==
=== United States ===
- Dora, Alabama, a city
- Dora, Arkansas, an unincorporated community and census-designated place
- Dora, Missouri, an unincorporated community
- Dora, New Mexico, a village
- Dora, Oregon, an unincorporated community
- Dora, Pennsylvania, an unincorporated community
- Dora Township, Otter Tail County, Minnesota
- Lake Dora (Florida)

=== Australia ===
- Lake Dora (Tasmania)
- Lake Dora (Western Australia)
- Dora Creek, New South Wales

=== Other places ===
- Dora, Cyprus, a village
- Dora, Baghdad, Iraq, a neighborhood
- Titular diocese of Dora, Israel, a Roman Catholic diocese
- Dora, Lebanon, a suburb northeast of Beirut
- Dura, Hebron, Palestinian West Bank, a city
- Dorasan or Mount Dora, a hill in South Korea
- 668 Dora, main belt asteroid

== Science and technology ==
- Dual orexin receptor antagonist, an orexin antagonist
- DORA (downregulated by activation), a common name for the gene IGSF6
- Dora (case study), pseudonym of a Sigmund Freud patient
- Discover, offer, request, acknowledge process in Dynamic Host Configuration Protocol
- DevOps Research and Assessment, a research team focused on software delivery practices

== Transportation ==
- SS Dora, the name of several ships
- Dora (sternwheeler), a 1910 steamboat in Oregon

== Acronyms ==
- Defence of the Realm Act 1914 (DORA), British war legislation
- Digital Operational Resilience Act, a European Union regulation
- Colorado Department of Regulatory Agencies (DORA)
- Designated outdoor refreshment areas, in open-container law in Ohio, United States
- San Francisco Declaration on Research Assessment

== Other uses ==
- List of storms named Dora
- Dora Observatory, South Korea, near the Demilitarized Zone
- Dora, medieval title of the feudal landlord in the Telangana region of India
- Dora, another name for the Italian wine grape Fortana

== See also ==
- Dorah (disambiguation)
- Dorie (disambiguation)
- Dumb Dora, comic strip and slang term
- Mittelbau-Dora concentration camp, World War II concentration camp
