= German U-boat bases in occupied Norway =

Naval bases in Norway

German U-boat bases in occupied Norway operated between 1940 and 1945, when the Kriegsmarine ('war navy'), converted several naval bases in Norway into submarine bases. Norwegian coastal cities became available to the Kriegsmarine after the invasion of Denmark and Norway in April 1940. Following the conclusion of the Norwegian Campaign (June 1940), the occupying Germans began to transfer U-boats stationed in Germany to many Norwegian port cities such as Bergen, Narvik, Trondheim, Hammerfest and Kirkenes. Initial planning for many U-boat bunkers began in late 1940. Starting in 1941, the Todt Organisation began the construction of bunkers in Bergen and Trondheim. These bunkers were completed by Weyss & Freytagg AG between 1942 and 1943.

The Kriegsmarine generally used U-boats stationed in Norway to extend its range of operation in the North Atlantic and Arctic Oceans. The Norwegian bases housed U-boats that took part in the interception of Allied convoys crossing the Arctic Ocean to the Soviet Union. Following the liberation of France by the Western Allies in 1944, U-boat activity in many Norwegian ports increased. With the French ports captured or cut off, many German U-boats re-located to Norwegian port cities.

During the German occupation of Norway, the Kriegsmarine stationed over 240 U-boats in the Nordic country at one time or another, most of them members of the 11th U-boat Flotilla, which had 190 U-boats in its fleet during the flotilla's entire career. Other well-known flotillas in Norway included the 13th and 14th Flotillas.

== German invasion of Norway ==
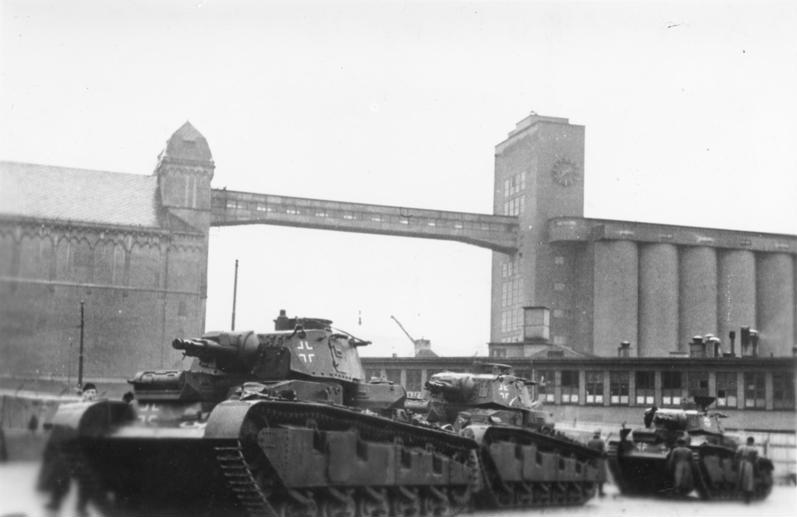
German tanks of the Neubaufahrzeug type in Oslo in April 1940

Germany invaded both Norway and Denmark on 9 April 1940. Norway was very important to Germany for two reasons: firstly as a base for naval units to harass Allied shipping in the North Atlantic and Arctic Oceans, and secondly to secure shipments of iron ore coming in from Sweden through the port of Narvik. During Operation Weserübung, Denmark fell in less than a day, becoming the briefest invasion in recorded military history. The Norwegians put up a stiffer resistance to the invading German forces. Nonetheless, by May the southern half of Norway was under German control. Following the German invasion of France and the Low Countries, the Allies were forced to evacuate Narvik, leaving the country to the Germans who would occupy it until the end of the war. After the invasion, Vidkun Quisling led the collaborationist government of Norway, based around the fascist Nasjonal Samling ('national gathering') party.

== German use of Norwegian ports ==
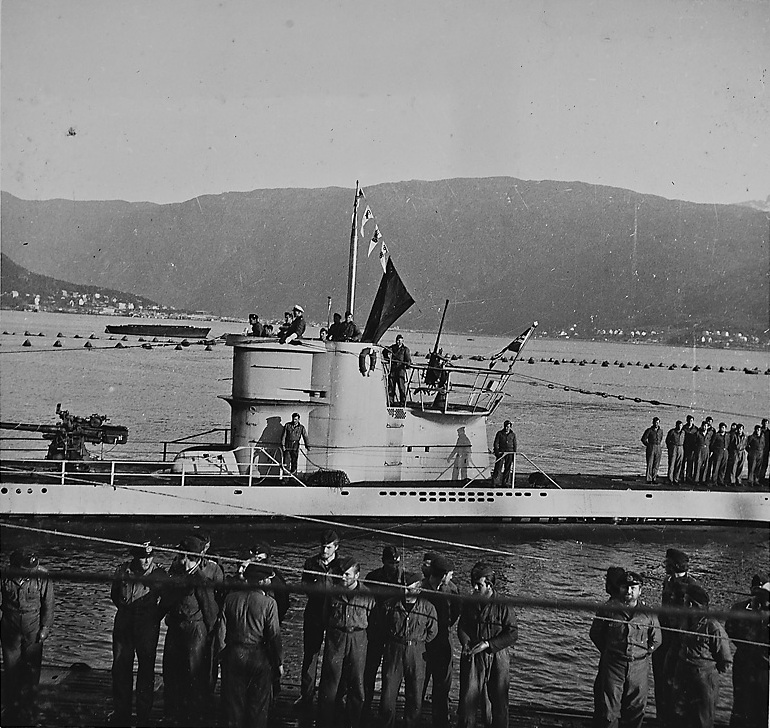
U-255 at Narvik after the attack on the ships of Convoy PQ 17

During the occupation, several of the nation's naval ports were turned into U-boat bases that were used to harass Allied shipping in the North Atlantic and Arctic Oceans. These included Bergen, Narvik, Trondheim, Hammerfest and Kirkenes. Over 240 U-boats were stationed in Norway at various times during the war, most of them were members of the 11th U-boat Flotilla which had 190 U-boats in its fleet during the flotilla's career. Other well-known flotillas in Norway included the 13th and 14th flotillas.

=== Bergen ===
The southern port of Bergen was captured by the Germans on 9 April 1940, on the first day of the invasion. The Germans immediately saw the potential for several Norwegian harbours and ports to function as bases of operation for the Kriegsmarine's U-boats patrolling the North Sea and the Arctic Ocean. It would become the home of the 11th U-boat Flotilla.

Bergen was the first Norwegian port to be established as a U-boat base. From July 1940 to the end of the war in May 1945, 270 U-boat patrols originated in Bergen. Bergen was also the site where the only type XXI submarine left for a patrol in the war; U-2511 left the port on 3 May 1945.

Planning for the first U-boat bunker in Bergen began in late 1940 and was undertaken by the German military engineering group, the Todt Organisation. It coordinated the building of the first U-boat bunker in Bergen, codenamed Bruno, as well as several other U-boat bunkers along the Norwegian coast. The construction of Bruno began in 1941. When it was completed it had seven pens, three of which were "dry" docks and three of which were "wet" docks. The seventh pen was used for storing fuel, torpedoes and other essentials. The bunker itself had a roof up to 6 metres (20 ft) thick and was 131 metres (430 ft) by 143 metres (469 ft) in area. Once Bruno was completed, it could hold up to 9 U-boats.

Bergen remained a quiet base during the first few years of the occupation, experiencing only one large Allied air attack. In 1943, the U-boat base added two new bunkers, U-Stützpunkt Prien and U-Stützpunkt Weddingen along with a shipyard named Danziger Werft.

The U-boat base at Bergen grew exponentially after the liberation of France by the Western Allies, when the senior commanding officer of U-boat operations in the west ("FdU West") was moved from Angers, France to the city. A large expansion program was conducted at the base and several new anti-aircraft guns were set up to protect the U-boat bunkers. More engineers and technicians were moved to Bergen to accommodate the increased technical requirements of the base as well. Two more bunkers named Werft Gemeinschaftslager 1 and Gemeinschaftslager 2 were also built during this time.

In late 1944 several British air attacks damaged the U-boat bases in Bergen. During one of these attacks, a 'Tallboy' bomb went straight through the roof of pen 3, damaging it beyond repair and putting it out of action for the remainder of the war. The base was handed over to the Allies, along with the rest of occupied Norway, on 8 May 1945 when all German forces in Europe surrendered. As a result of the intensive bombing of the city in late 1944 and 1945, the Bergen area was one of the worst damaged regions in the south of Norway at the conclusion of the war.

=== Trondheim ===
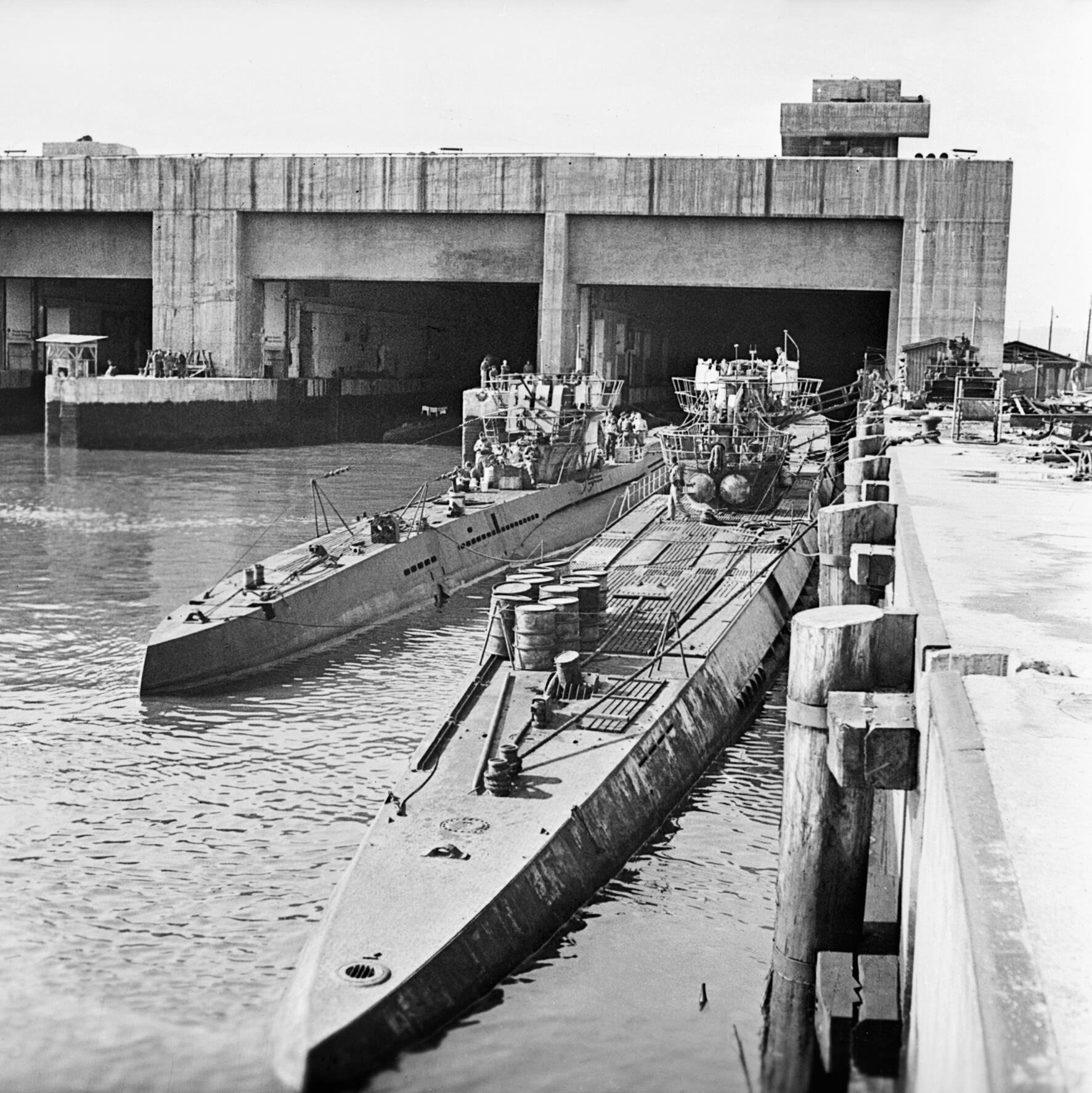
German type VII and IX U-boats at Trondheim after the war on 19 May 1945

Trondheim was an important U-boat base in Norway during the war. It was the home of the 13th flotilla and sent out around 55 U-boat patrols between June 1940 and the end of the war in May 1945.

The list of surrendered U-boats in Trondheim included following: U-310, U-315, U-483, U-773, U-775, U-861, U-953, U-978, U-994, U-995, U-1019, U-1064 and U-1203.

Two U-boat bunkers, codenamed "Dora I" and "Dora II", were constructed in Trondheim to provide additional repair facilities outside Germany itself. Like the bunkers in Bergen, the two bunkers in Trondheim came under the control of the Todt Organisation. Only "Dora I", which the Kriegsmarine took charge of in 1943, was completed before the end of the war. At 47 metres (153 ft) long and 32 metres (105 ft) wide it had five pens with space to hold seven U-boats. Construction of "Dora II" began in 1942 but was never completed. If finished it would have been 51 metres (168 ft) long by 31 metres (102 ft) wide, with four pens capable of holding six U-boats.
