= Dora II =

Unfinished German submarine base in Trondheim, Norway

Coordinates: 63°26′28″N 10°25′11″E

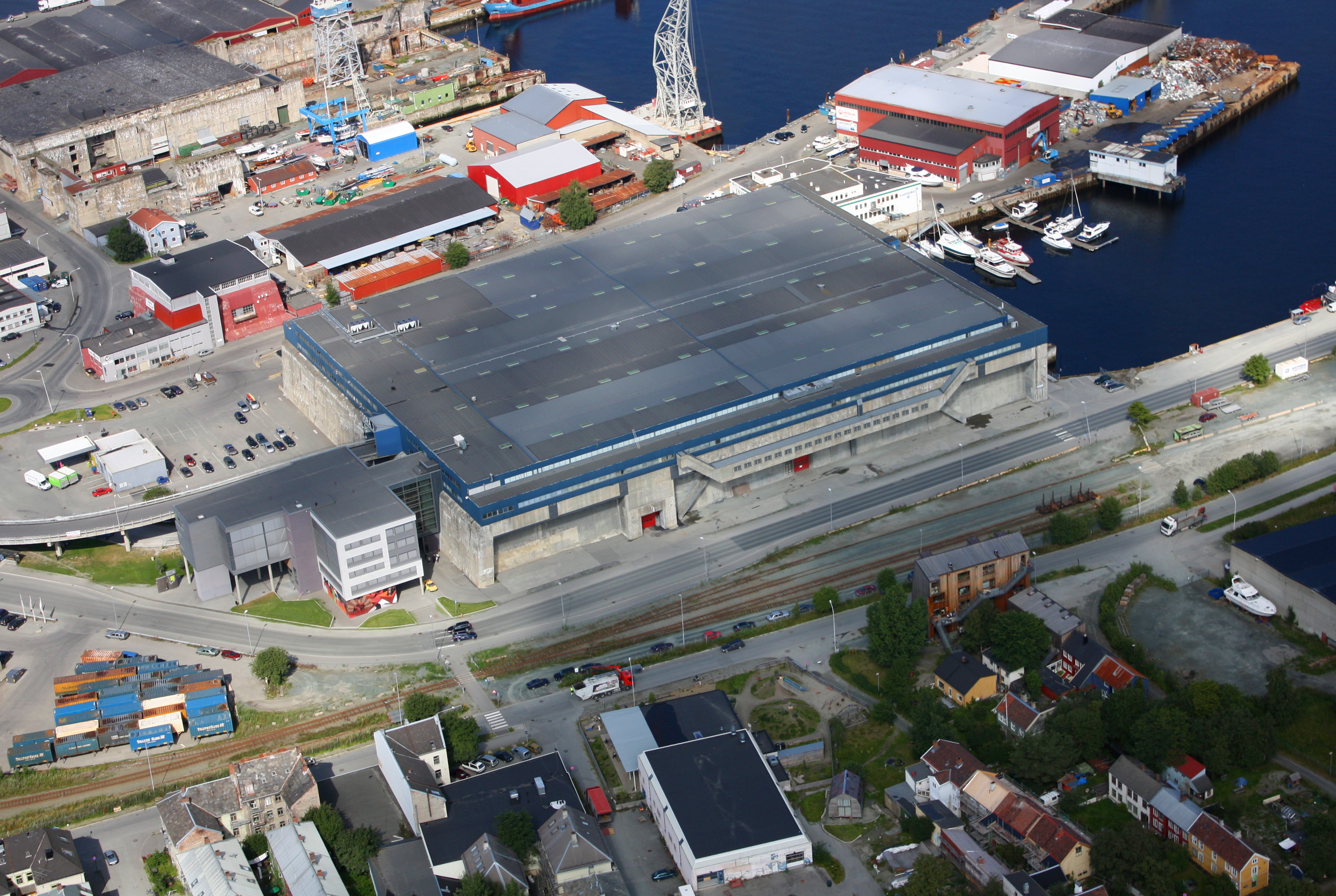
Dora I (foreground with blue upper levels) and Dora II (background with only a partial roof). Dora II is a more open and incomplete structure than Dora I.

Dora II (Dora 2) is an unfinished German submarine base and submarine pen or bunker in Trondheim, Norway, which is next to Dora I (Dora 1). Construction of the bunker (designated by the Germans as DORA II) was undertaken during the Second World War, but the complex was never finished unlike Dora I. Trondheim was traditionally referred to as Drontheim in German, and the name DORA is the letter "D" in the German phonetic alphabet.

== History ==
=== Background ===
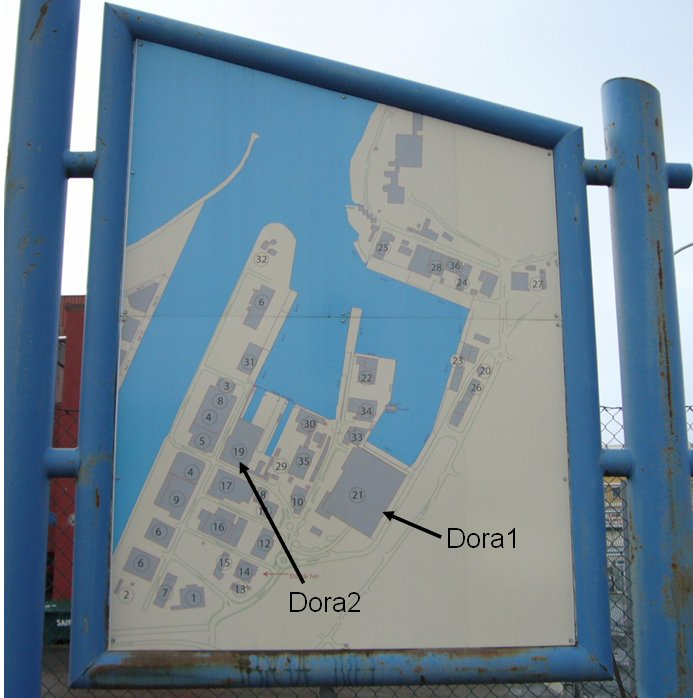
Diagram showing locations of the submarine bunkers

Following the occupation of Norway in 1940, it was soon realised that the country only had limited facilities for minor naval repairs. More extensive work usually meant a return to Germany. The capitulation of France two months later overshadowed the strategic importance of Norway to some extent, but it was still regarded as a better location for access to the Atlantic and Arctic Oceans than Germany. Nevertheless, better protection for U-boats from aerial attack was required so a bunker-building programme was instigated.

German U-boat bases in occupied Norway operated between 1940 and 1945, when the Kriegsmarine (German navy), converted several naval bases in Norway into submarine bases. Trondheim was an important U-boat base in Norway during the war. It was the home of the 13th flotilla and it had 55 U-boats assigned to the flotilla during its service.

=== Construction ===
The German civil and military engineering group, Organisation Todt, started constructing the facility as a submarine base as they were finishing Dora I (completed in June 1943).

Construction of Dora II began in 1942 but was never completed. The second bunker was a little more than half complete by the time the war ended. If finished it would have been 168 feet (51 m) long by 102 feet (31 m) wide, with four pens capable of holding six U-boats. The completed walls are 3 m (9 ft 10 in) thick, and the roof is 3.5 m (11 ft 6 in) thick (only a quarter of the roof was completed).

== After World War II ==
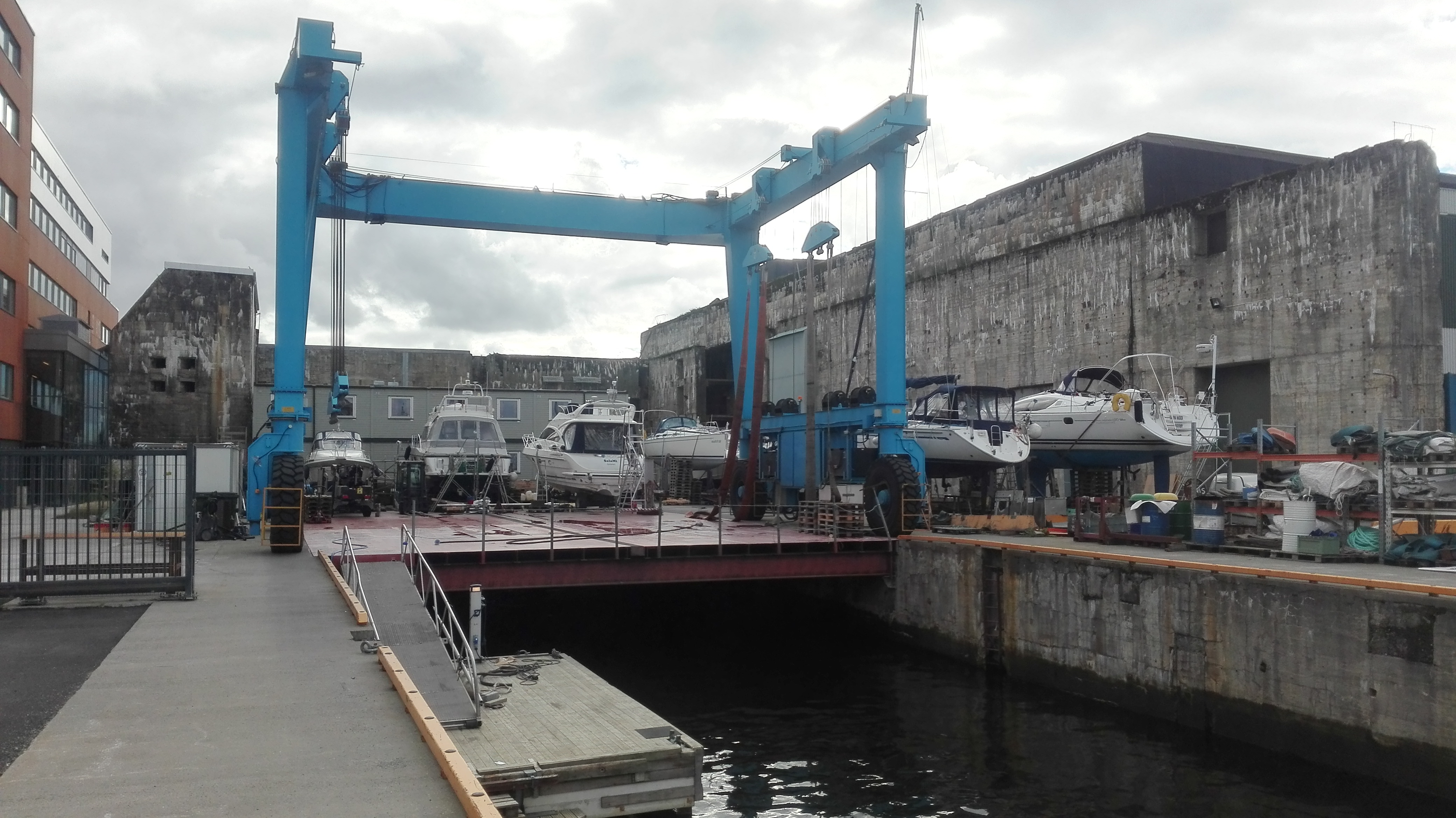
Inside of Dora 2 (2016)

In 1947 and 1948 the port authority conducted cleanup and blasting on Dora II. Part of the walls on the uncompleted sides were blasted away.

Dora II is used as a shipyard and as a warehouse and garage for boats and cars by companies such as Trondheim Verft AS and Skipsmaling AS.
