= Dora I =

Former German submarine base and bunker in Norway

Coordinates: 63°26′23″N 10°25′16″E

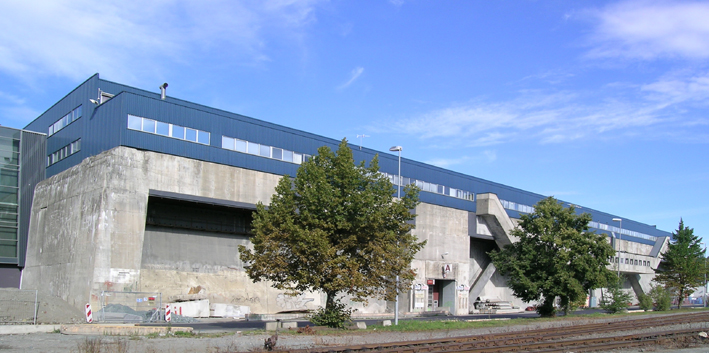
Dora I, a former submarine bunker

Dora I (Dora 1) is a former German submarine base and submarine pen or bunker built in Trondheim, Norway. Construction of the bunker (designated by the Germans as DORA I) was undertaken during the Second World War. Nearby is the uncompleted Dora II (Dora 2). Trondheim was traditionally referred to as Drontheim in German, and the name DORA is the letter "D" in the German phonetic alphabet.

== History ==
=== Background ===
Following the occupation of Norway in 1940, it was soon realised that the country only had limited facilities for minor naval repairs. More extensive work usually meant a return to Germany. The capitulation of France two months later overshadowed the strategic importance of Norway to some extent, but it was still regarded as a better location for access to the Atlantic and Arctic Oceans than Germany. Nevertheless, better protection for U-boats from aerial attack was required so a bunker-building programme was instigated.

German U-boat bases in occupied Norway operated between 1940 and 1945, when the Kriegsmarine (German navy), converted several naval bases in Norway into submarine bases. Trondheim was an important U-boat base in Norway during the war. It was the home of the 13th U-boat Flotilla and it had 55 U-boats assigned to the flotilla during its service.

=== Construction ===
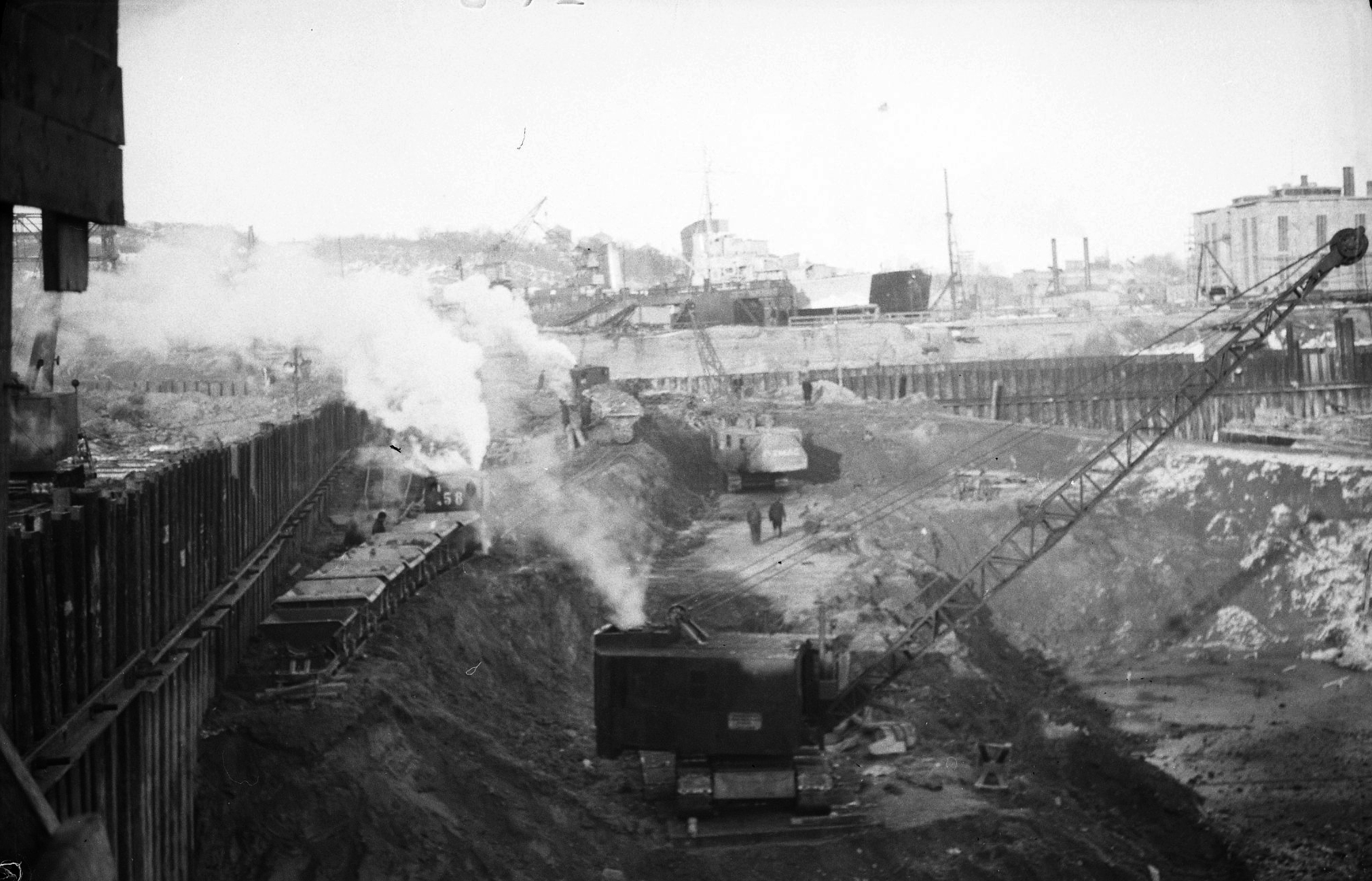
Construction of the bunker

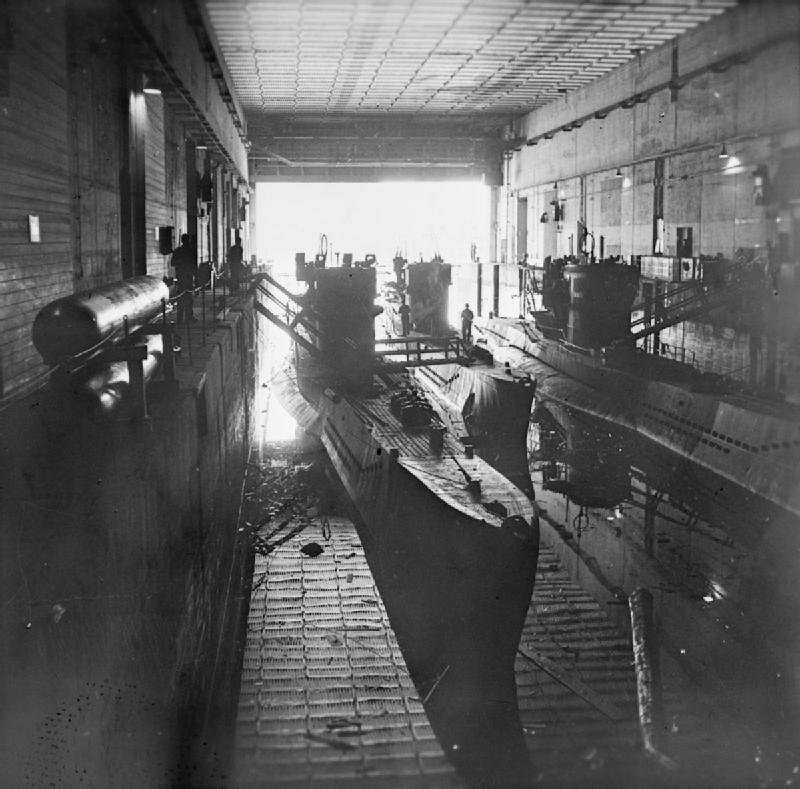
Three U-boats in a submarine pen at Trondheim, 19 May 1945

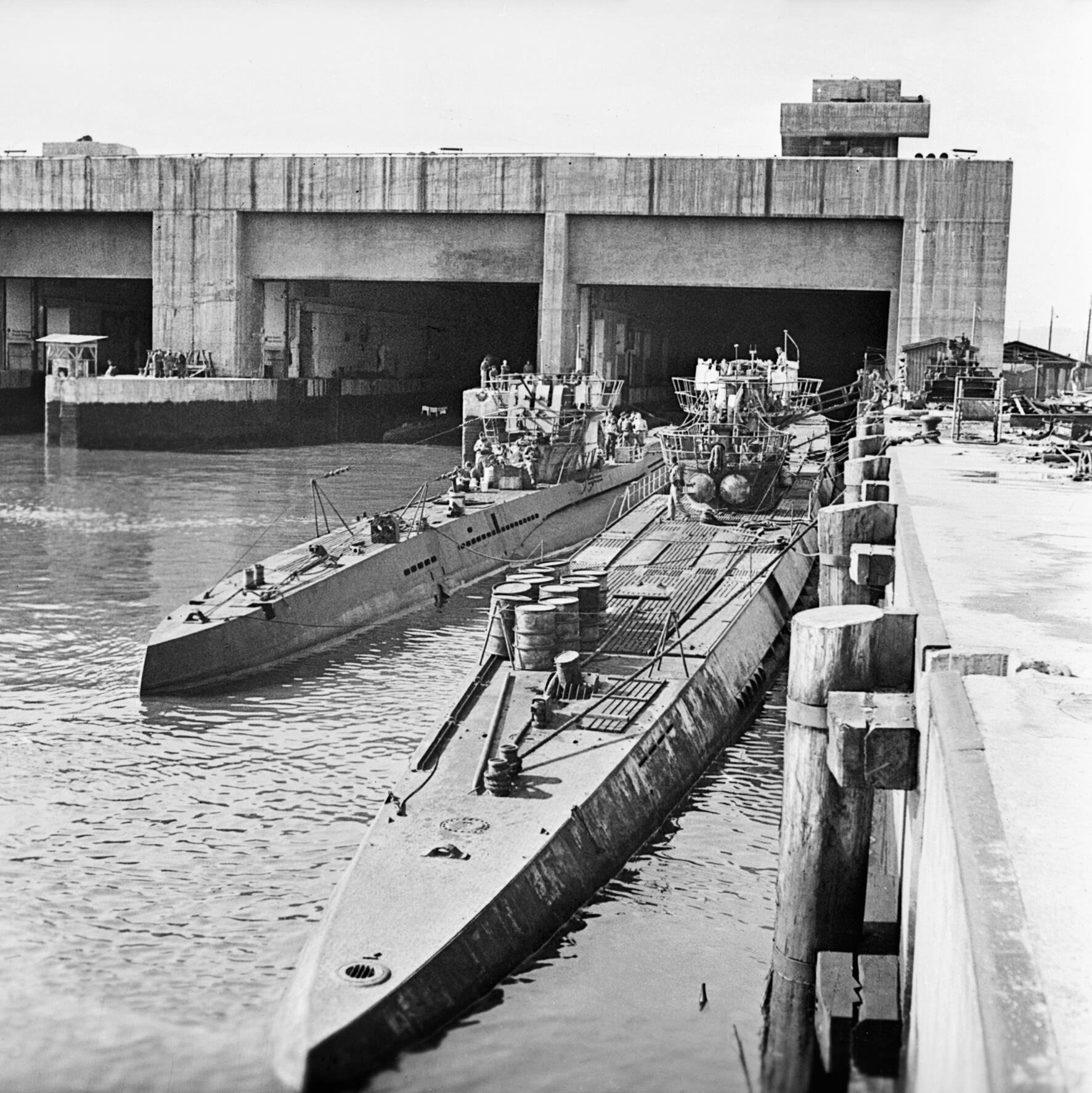
German type VII and IX U-boats at Trondheim after the war on 19 May 1945

Construction of the bunker which would become part of the largest German naval base in Northern Europe, started in the autumn of 1941, one year after the invasion of Norway. The concrete roof was 3.5 m (11 ft 6 in) thick and reinforced with steel. The walls were also concrete but these were 3 m (9 ft 10 in) thick. The whole bunker was 153 m × 105 m (167 yd × 115 yd). The work was undertaken by the Todt Organisation's (OT) Einsatzgruppe 'Wiking' and the Sager & Wörner construction company from Munich.

The OT used slave labour extensively; five Serbian workers died when a wall fell on them. This incident fuelled a widespread rumor that the Germans simply left the bodies inside the wall. While German engineers did calculate that the five bodies would not weaken the fortification considerably, the bodies were removed before construction continued.

Difficulties with the labour force was not the only problem. The acquisition of raw materials was also a problem. Many Norwegian buildings were erected from timber so cement, sand and aggregate - components essential for the production of concrete - were often hard to extract in sufficient quantities. The steel required for reinforcing was mostly imported from Germany. The weather also played its part; roads and railways were often affected by snow and ice. Pre-fabricated accommodation units from Germany proved to be inadequate. More ships were delayed by the weather than enemy interference. Most construction machinery also had to be imported.

The bunkers in Norway were originally slated for a second floor to be built over the submarine pens. This was to house accommodation, workshops and offices. The idea was abandoned at the end of 1941 due to the problems already mentioned. The choice of site did not help either. Accumulated mud, on top of clay and sand layers proved to be incompatible with existing designs and was unstable ground so that the bunker had to be built in parts and stabilized before continuing construction.

Construction of a smaller bunker just west of it, Dora II (Dora 2), was started in 1942, but it was only half-completed by the end of the war. This building is presently used by a shipyard. Plans for a Dora III (Dora 3) in Leangen Bay (Leangenbukta) were postponed and construction never started.

=== In service ===
Dora I developed a noticeable sag of up to 15 cm (5.9 in) which seemed to concern the builders more than the U-boat sailors. It was finally handed over to the Kriegsmarine on 20 June 1943 as the home base of the 13th U-boat Flotilla. The bunker, which could be hermetically sealed when attacked, had room for 16 U-boats. A number of U-boats surrendered in Trondheim at the end of the war on 9 May 1945.

During the war Allied bombing raids targeted German submarine pens (bunkers). In July 1943 an American bombing raid was conducted against the German base at Trondheim. Workshops in the area were destroyed, there was large material damage including on civilian targets, and the German reports were that they were set back three months in their construction plans (loss of materials and other damage would have contributed to delays on building Dora II). Only light damage was ever reported on Dora I. A British bombing raid was attempted in November 1944, but because of low cloud cover/fog and smoke laying by the Germans the bombers turned back and did not bomb Trondheim.

== After World War II ==
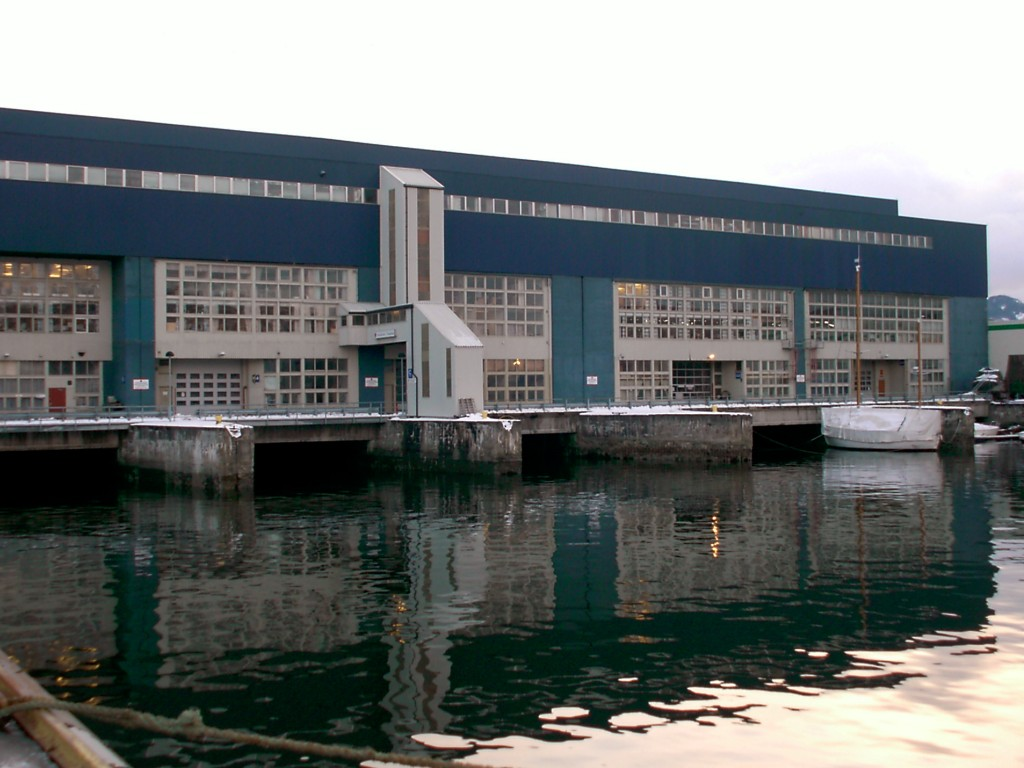
Submarines could enter the base using these pens. For a closeup, click here

After the war, Dora I was to be blown up using dynamite, but this project was eventually cancelled due to the massive construction and the sheer size of the bunker. Blowing it up would have caused serious damage to the surrounding buildings as well. In the summer of 1945 the Norwegian submarine force were transferred from Britain and Dora I was used by them until 1954, when they were moved to the submarine pens in Bergen. The base was used by the Norwegian Defence Forces; two extra stories, painted in blue, were added.

Dora I was converted into a warehouse and workshop building. Today, the former naval base is the home of the city and state archives, a bowling alley and several other businesses. The submarine pens originally built for holding German U-boats are now being used as a harbour for civilian boats.

== Gallery ==
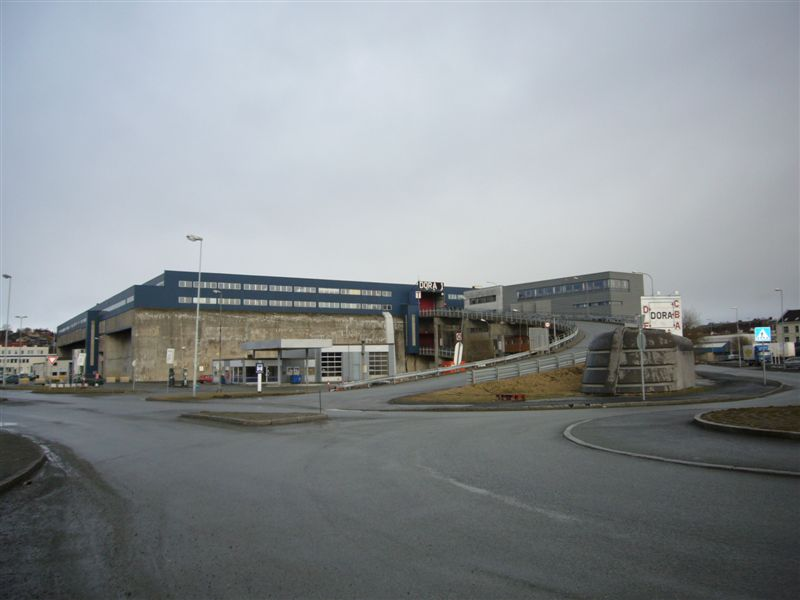
Full front view of complex.

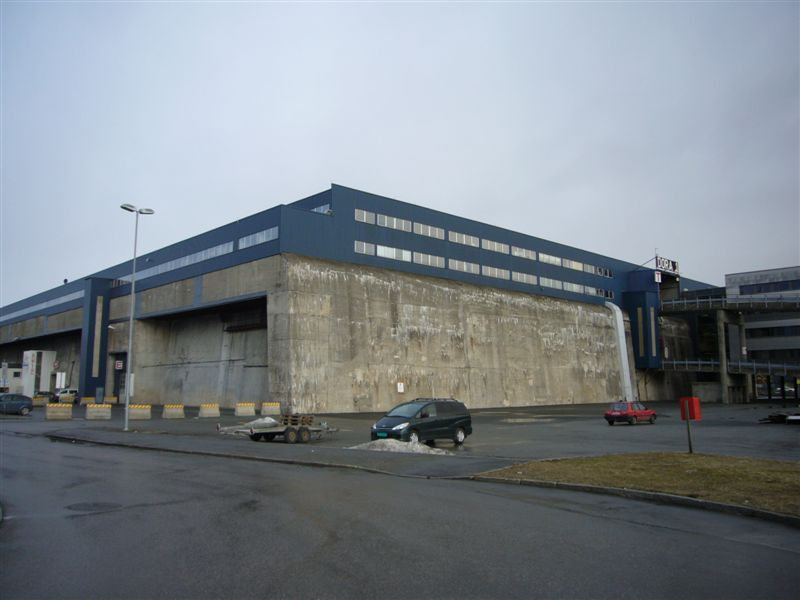
Corner view, shows thickness of concrete.

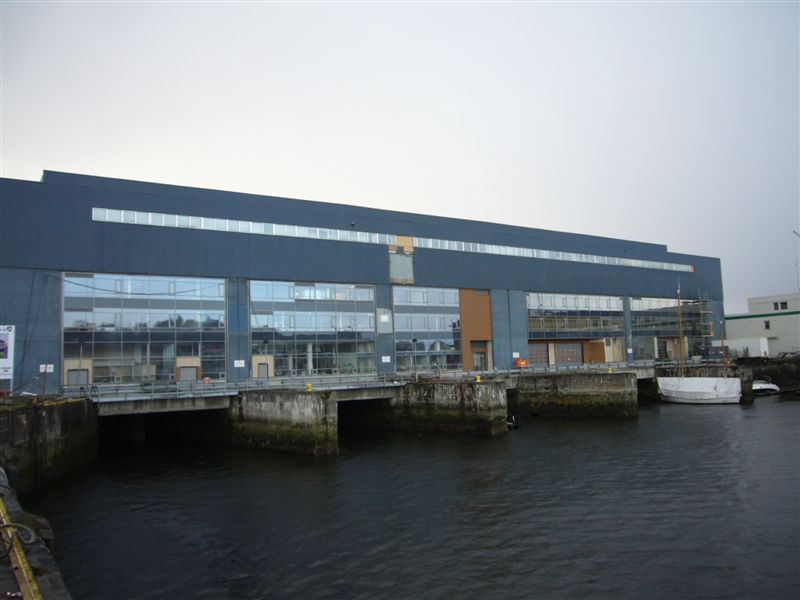
Recently, the fjord side has been under renovation.

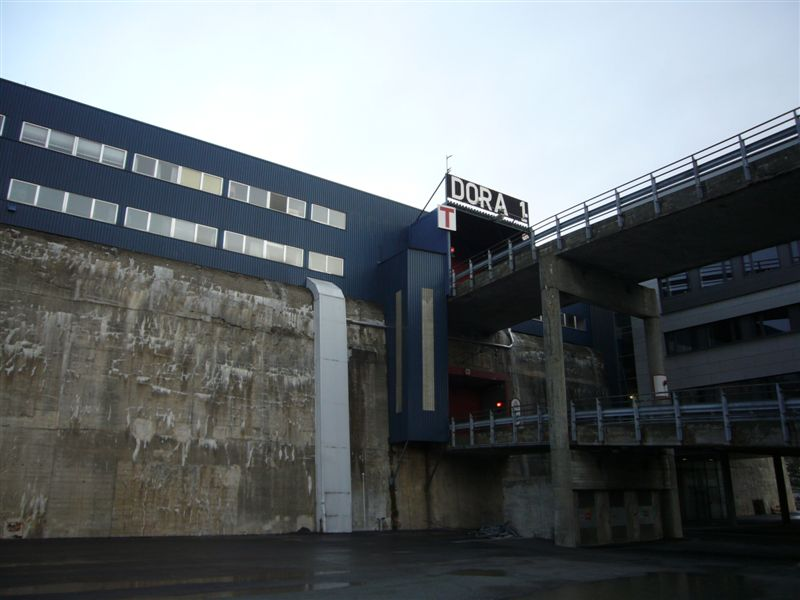
Close up of drive-up ramps on front side.

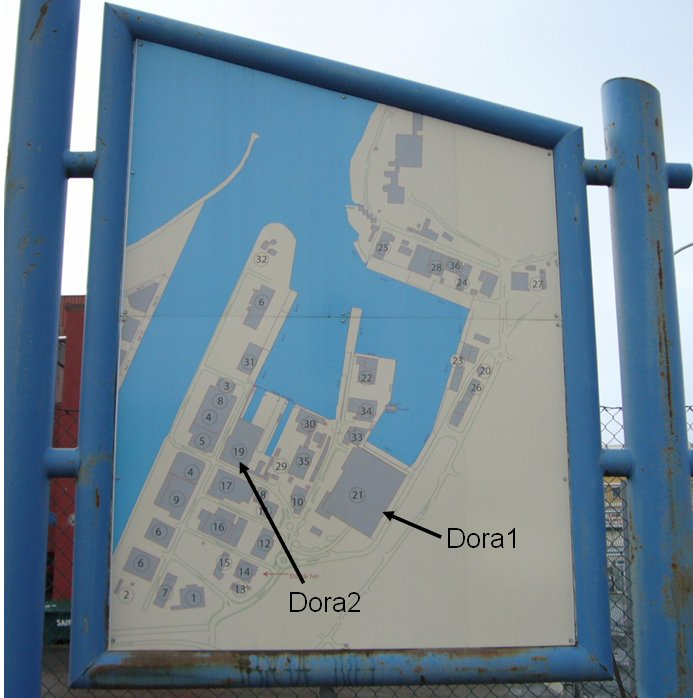
Sign showing buildings in the fjord harbour area with arrows added to point to the Dora complexes.
