= Dora, Pennsylvania =

Dora
- Unincorporated community
- Location within Pennsylvania
- Coordinates: 40°58′00″N 79°09′37″W
- Country: United States
- State: Pennsylvania
- County: Jefferson County

Dora is an unincorporated community in Jefferson County, in the U.S. state of Pennsylvania.

== History ==
Dora contained a post office from 1883 until 1974.
