= Submarine pen =

Bunker housing U-boats

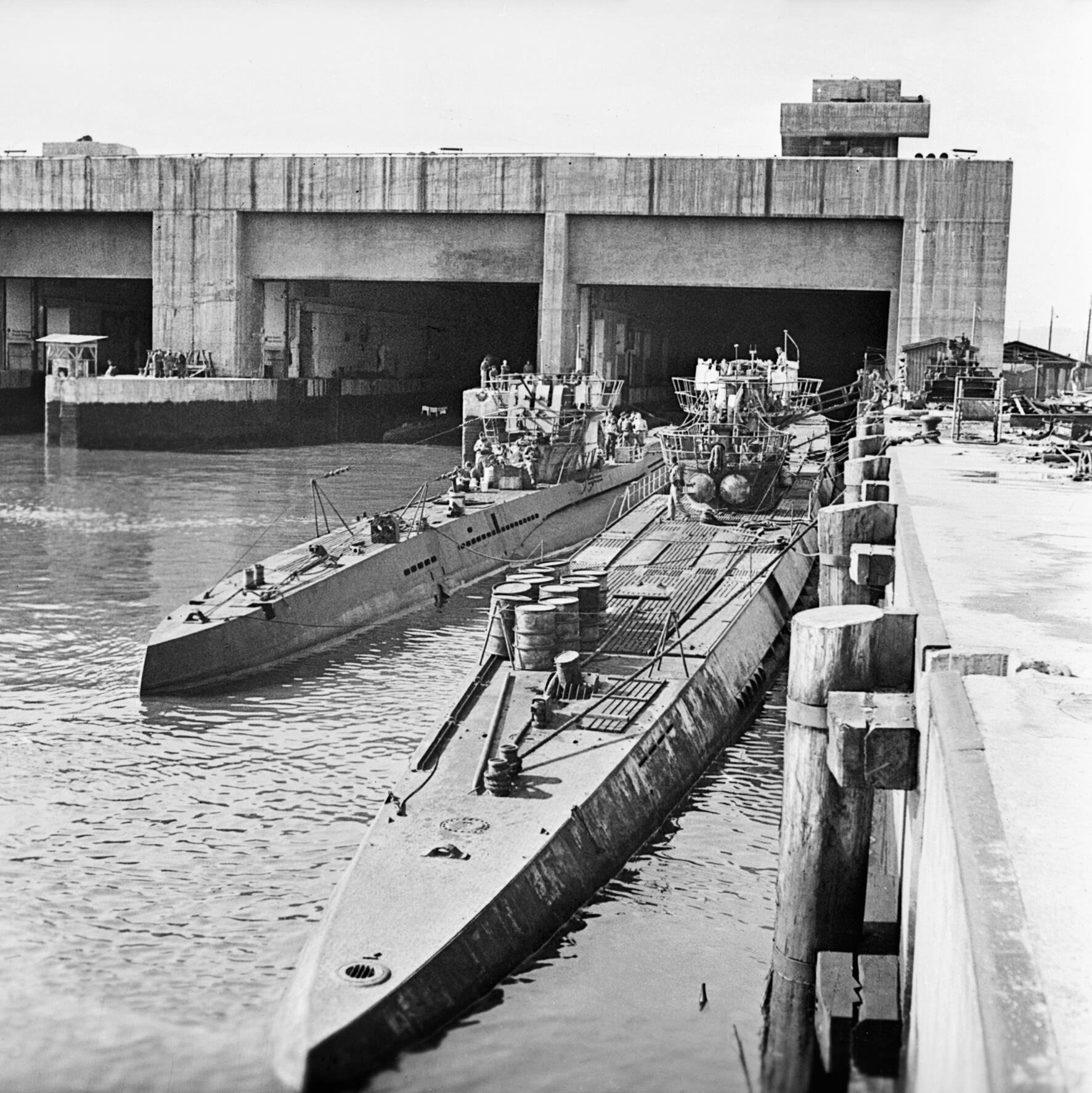
Surrendered German U-boats moored outside the Dora I bunker in Trondheim, Norway, May 1945

A submarine pen (U-Boot-Bunker in German) is a type of submarine base that acts as a bunker to protect submarines from air attack.

The term is generally applied to submarine bases constructed during World War II, particularly in Germany and its occupied countries, which were also known as U-boat pens (after the phrase "U-boat" to refer to German submarines).

== Background ==
Among the first forms of protection for submarines were some open-sided shelters with partial wooden foundations that were constructed during World War I. These structures were built at the time when bombs were light enough to be dropped by hand from the cockpit. By the 1940s, the quality of aerial weapons and the means to deliver them had improved markedly.

The mid-1930s saw the Naval Construction Office in Berlin give the problem serious thought. Various factions in the navy were convinced protection for the expanding U-boat arm was required. A Royal Air Force (RAF) raid on the capital in 1940, the occupation of France and Britain's refusal to surrender triggered a massive building programme of submarine pens and air raid shelters.

By the autumn of 1940, construction of the "Elbe II" bunker in Hamburg and "Nordsee III" on the island of Heligoland was under way. Others swiftly followed.

== General ==
It was soon realized that such a massive project was beyond the Kriegsmarine, and the Todt Organisation (OT) was brought in to oversee the administration of labour. The local supply of such items as sand, aggregate, cement, and timber was often a cause for concern. The steel required was mostly imported from Germany. The attitudes of the people in France and Norway were significantly different. In France there was generally no problem with the recruitment of men and the procurement of machinery and raw materials. Local Norwegian populations were far more reluctant to help the Germans. Indeed, most labour had to be brought in. The ground selected for bunker construction was no help either: usually being at the head of a fjord, the foundations and footings had to be hewn out of granite. Several metres of silt also had to be overcome. Many of the workers needed were forced labour, especially the concentration camp inmates supplied by the Schutzstaffel from camps near the pens.

The incessant air raids caused serious disruption to the project, hampering the supply of material, destroying machinery, and harassing the workers. Machinery such as excavators, pile drivers, cranes, floodlighting, and concrete pumps (which were still a relatively new technology in the 1940s) was temperamental, and in the case of steam-driven equipment, very noisy.

Bunkers had to be able to accommodate more than just U-boats; space had to be found for offices, medical facilities, communications, lavatories, generators, ventilators, anti-aircraft guns, accommodation for key personnel such as crewmen, workshops, water purification plants, electrical equipment, and radio testing facilities. Storage space for spares, explosives, ammunition, and oil was also required.

== Types of bunker ==
Four types of bunker were constructed:

- Covered lock

These were bunkers built over an existing lock to give a U-boat some protection while it was at its most vulnerable – i.e. when the lock was emptying or filling. They were usually constructed with new locks alongside an existing structure.

- Construction bunker

Used for building new boats

- Fitting-out bunkers

After launch, many U-boats were fitted-out under their protection

- Shelter for operational boats and repair bunkers

This was the most numerous type. There were two types that were built either on dry land or over the water. The former meant that U-boats had to be moved on ramps; the latter enabled the boats to come and go at will. Pumping the water out enabled dry dock repairs to be carried out. Some bunkers were large enough to allow the removal of periscopes and aerials.

There is no truth in the rumour of an underground bunker on Fuerteventura in the Canary Islands. This story was gleaned from a similar situation in Le Havre in France when captured U-boat crews were interrogated by the British.

== Locations ==
Pens were constructed in the northern coastal ports of the Reich and in many occupied countries.

=== Germany ===
Pens protecting construction of the Type XXI submarine were located in Hamburg (Blohm & Voss), Bremen (AG Weser), and Danzig (F. Schichau).

==== Bremen ====
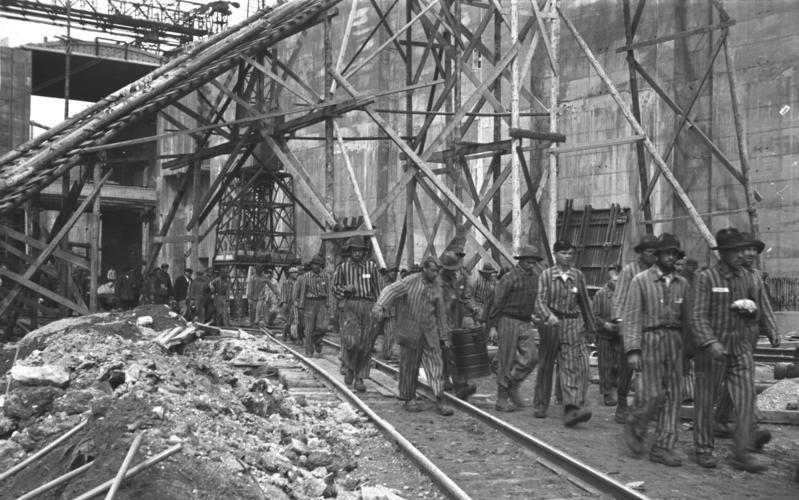
Forced workers at the construction site of the Valentin submarine pens in Bremen, 1944

The "Hornisse" bunker (Note: 53°07′01.5″N 08°44′04″E) was not started until 1944 in Bremen; it was never completed.

"Valentin" (Note: 53°13′00″N 08°30′15″E) was the largest bunker in Germany. Begun in 1943, it was built to be a manufacturing facility, where Type XXI submarines were to be constructed. It, too, was never completed. Post-war, it was briefly used as a test site for British and American bombs (most of the damage done to the bunker was inflicted at this time) before becoming a storage facility for the German Navy. The labour to construct it was supplied by local concentration camps such as Neuengamme in Hamburg.

==== Hamburg ====
The city was the site of two structures, "Elbe II" (Note: 53°31′43″N 09°57′08″E) and "Fink II" (Note: 53.541°N 09.854°E). The Finkenwerder bunker was constructed by 1,700 slave labourers over four years. After capture, it was demolished with 32 tonnes of bombs.

==== Helgoland ====
The "Nordsee III" bunker (Note: 54.177199°N 07.893521°E) in Helgoland was one of the oldest submarine pens, being started in 1940. It escaped Allied bombing until near the end of the war when it was attacked by the RAF and completely destroyed. It was also used after the end of the war for testing new weapons. No trace of the pen remains.

==== Kiel ====
This town was constantly bombed in World War II, the targets often being the "Kilian" and "Konrad" bunkers. They were started in 1941 and 1942 respectively. The latter was used for the construction of Seehund midget submarines.

It was in "Kilian" that U-4708 likely became the only submarine to be lost in a bunker. Off target bombs dropped in an air raid on the town caused a wave that crossed the Förde and enter the bunker. The wash swamped U-4708 but U-170 alongside was saved because its captain, Oberleutenant zur See Hans-Gerold Hauber, had ordered all hatches on his boat to be closed, even though it was in the bunker. "This simple precaution saved from sinking while lying next to U-4708".

==== Wilhelmshaven ====
A U-boat bunker in Wilhelmshaven was planned, but never advanced beyond the preliminary stage.

=== France ===
The German occupying forces built many U-boat pens in the Atlantic ports of France in Bordeaux, Brest, La Rochelle/La Pallice, Lorient, and St. Nazaire. Almost 4.4 million cubic metres of concrete were used. These Atlantic bases expanded the u-boat striking range–allowing for voyages to the Mediterranean Sea, the west African coast, the Gulf of Mexico, and the United States' eastern seaboard.

==== Bordeaux ====
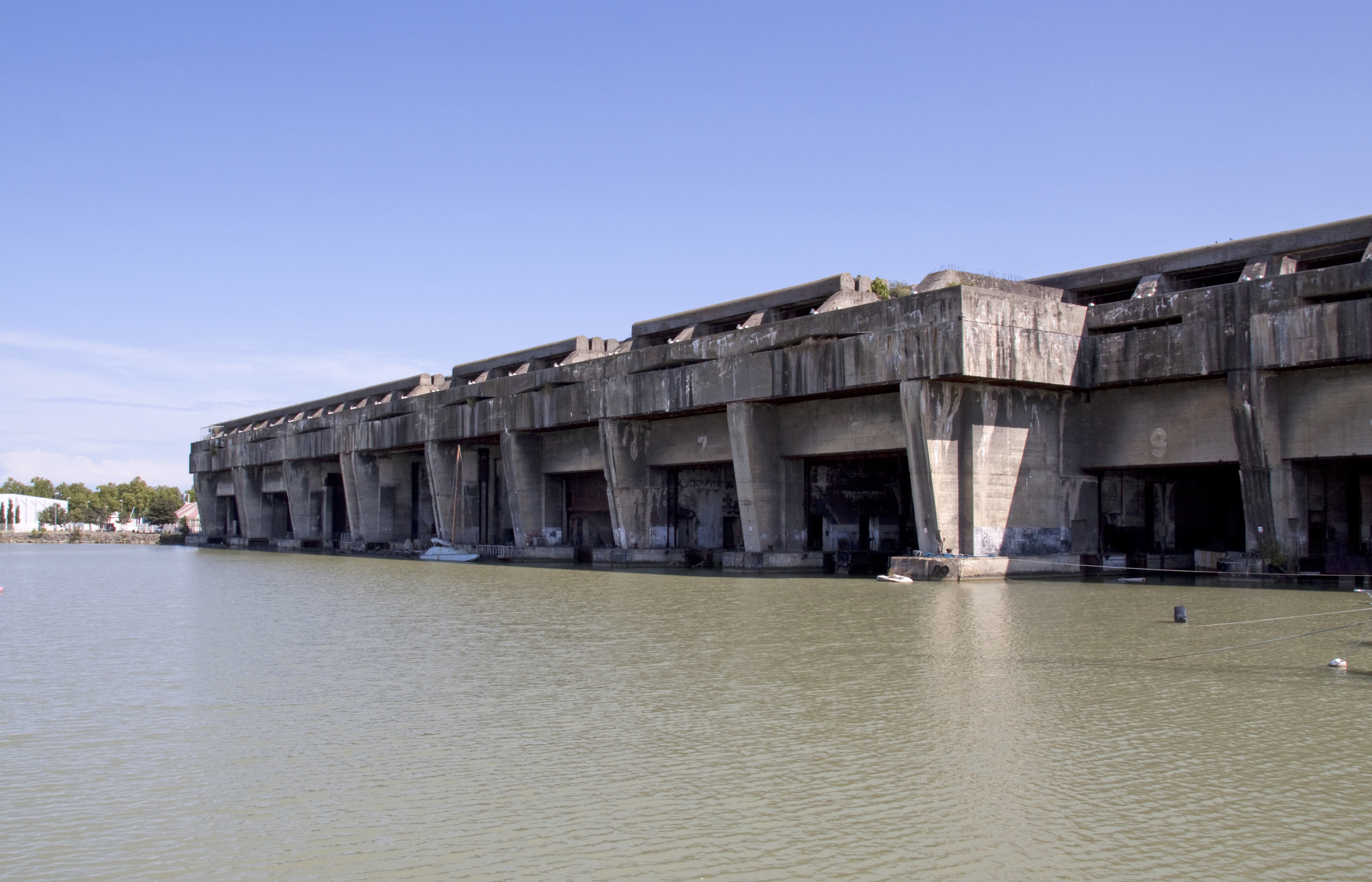
Bordeaux U-boat pens

An unnamed bunker and bunkered lock were constructed in Bordeaux, the fourth largest French city at the start of the war. Both structures were started in 1941; the bunkered lock was not finished by war's end. The main building was larger than those in other locations; this was to allow supply boats and minelayers to use it. The Royal Italian Navy established the Betasom base at Bordeaux. The port was also the target of a British commando raid – the so-called Cockleshell Heroes. It has now been transformed into the largest digital art centre in the world.

44°52′11″N 0°33′31″W

==== Brest ====
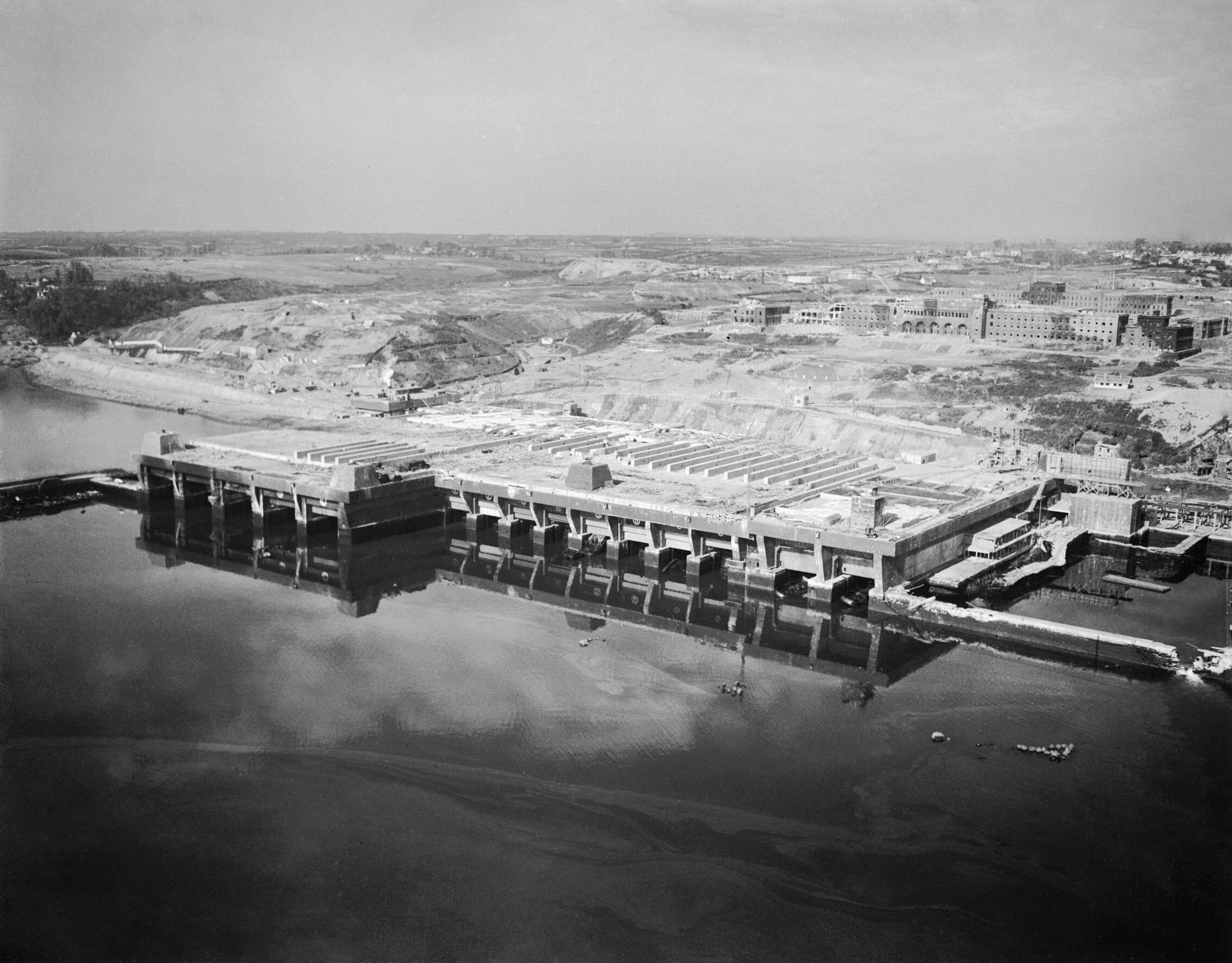
Brest U-boat pens

The Brittany port only had one bunker, but it was the largest; it was also unnamed. Started in 1941, the plans were modified many times before completion a year later.

By February 1942 the RAF had lost interest in the area; most of the town had already been destroyed and they did not possess large enough bombs to seriously threaten the bunker. Between February 1942 and early 1943, apart from a few American aircraft, the place was left alone. The German garrison surrendered to US forces in September 1944. They had had sufficient explosives to cripple the bunker but did not use them due to the proximity of a hospital.

48°22′00″N 04°31′20″W

Brest is still a submarine base, now serving the French Navy, and the bunker is still in use today.

==== La Rochelle/La Pallice ====
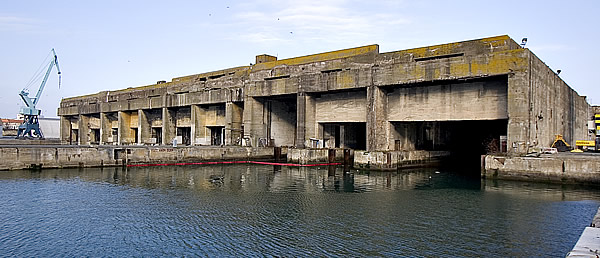
La Rochelle U-Boat pens

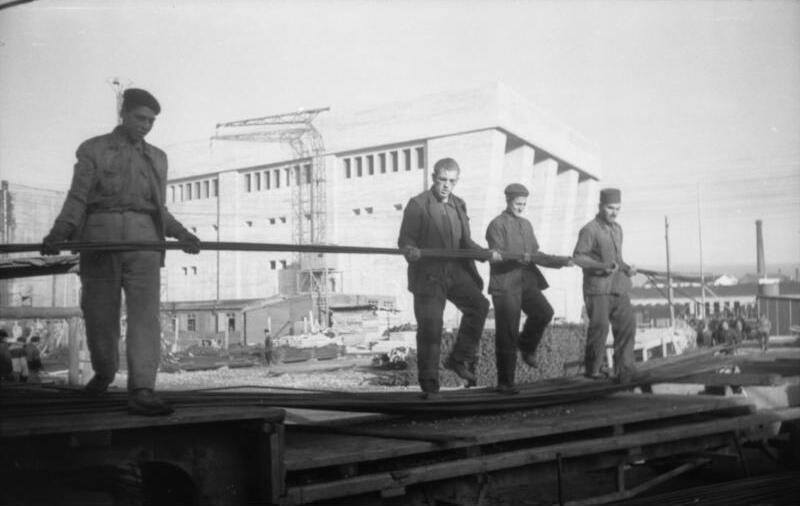
Construction of the U-boat base at La Pallice, 1942

Only 6 kilometres (3.7 mi) separate La Rochelle and La Pallice so they are usually considered as one port. An unnamed bunker was built at La Pallice (Base sous-marine de La Rochelle); it was started in April 1941. Similar building techniques to those used in St. Nazaire were employed. Due to the relative ease of construction, the main structure was ready for its first U-boats six months later. A bunkered lock was begun in June 1942. It was completed in March 1944. Scenes for the 1981 films Das Boot and Raiders of the Lost Ark were shot in La Pallice.

46°09′31″N 01°12′34″W

==== Lorient ====
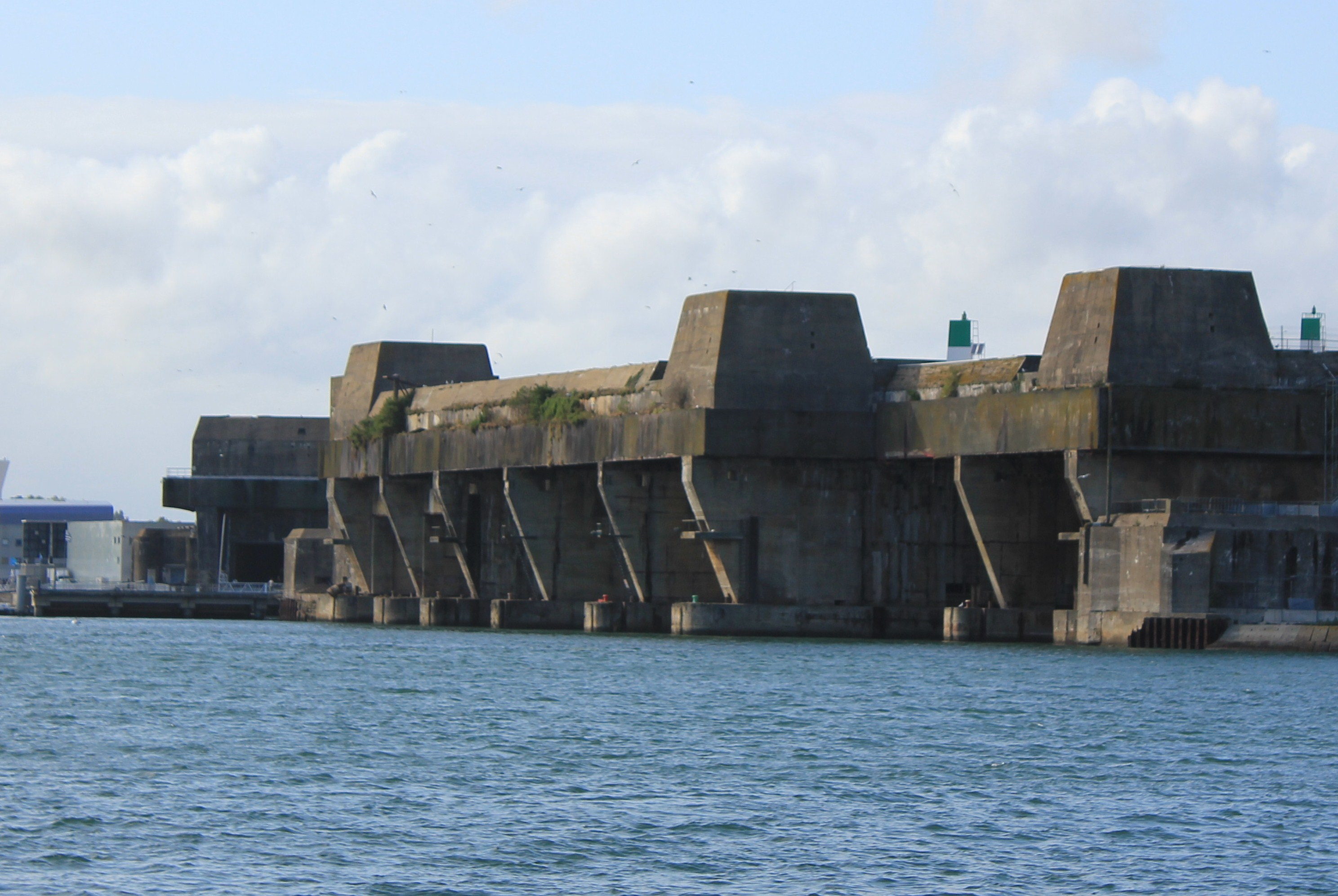
Keroman I and Keroman III, Lorient

The largest U-boat base was the Lorient Submarine Base in Brittany. Three bunkers, "Keroman I", "II" and "III", the "Scorff" bunker and two "Dom" bunkers, east and west, were all begun in 1941. Two more were in the planning stage.

"Keroman I" was unique in that it required its U-boats to be "hauled out of the water, placed on a many-wheeled buggy and then transported into the bunker on a sliding bridge system." This arrangement might have been more vulnerable to air raids, but damage was minimal and it had the advantage of the U-boat not needing a dry dock. "Keroman II", being landlocked, was served by the same system.

Keroman I: 47°43′45″N 03°22′12″W
Keroman II: 47°43′52″N 03°22′18″W

"Keroman III" was more conventional, as was the "Scorff" bunker. The two "Dom" bunkers (so-called because of their resemblance to the religious building, Dom means 'cathedral' in German) were located around a massive turntable which fed U-boats into the covered repair bays.

Keroman III: 47°43′38″N 03°22′02″W
Scorff: 47°45′02″N 03°20′53″W
Dom (East): 47°43′56″N 03°22′02″W
Dom (West): 47°43′55″N 03°22′07″W

Karl Dönitz, head of the U-boat arm and later the chief of the Kriegsmarine, had his headquarters at nearby Kernevel villa.

==== St-Nazaire ====
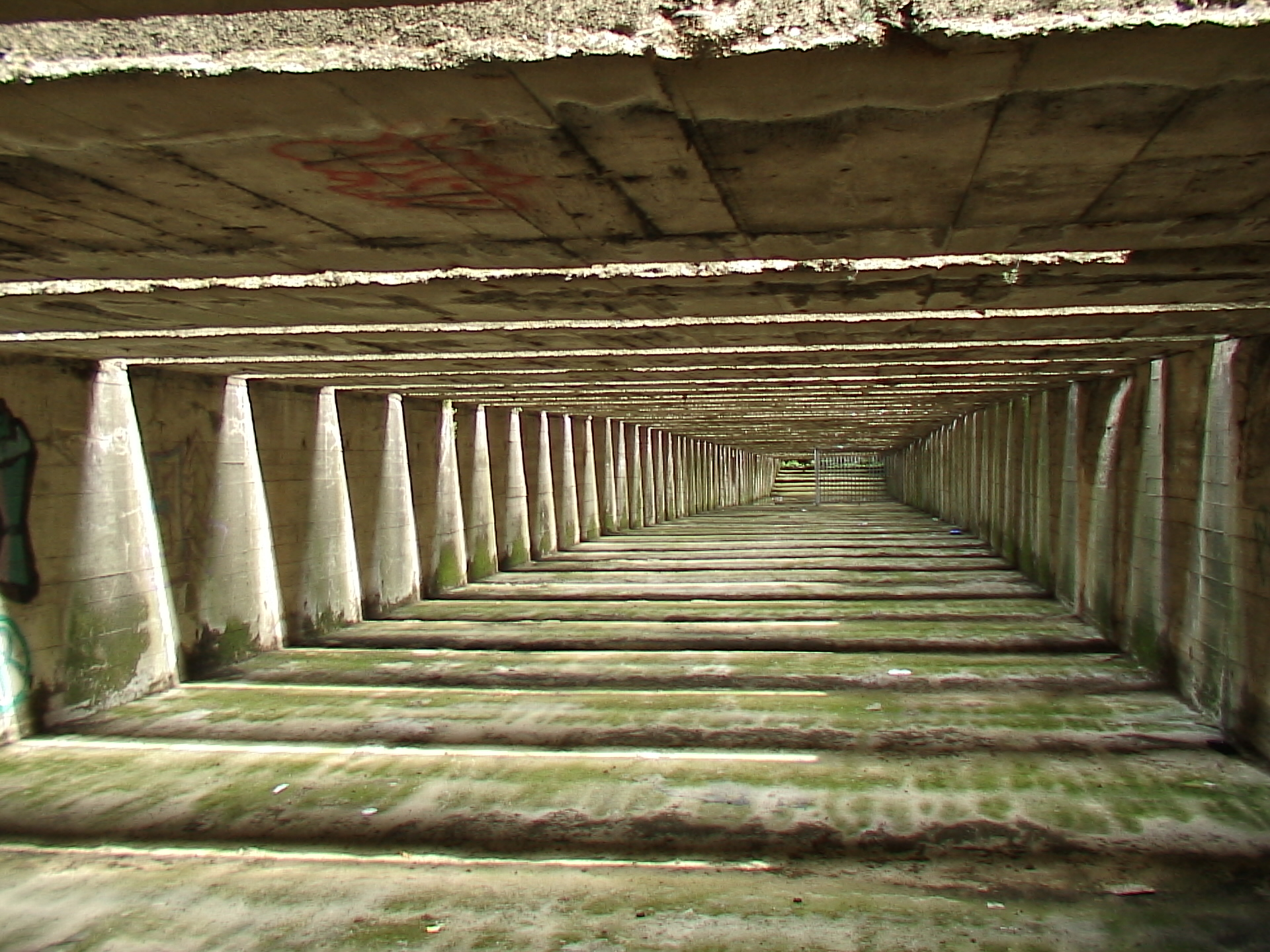
Roof of the U-boat base in Saint Nazaire.

The construction of the Saint-Nazaire submarine base was commenced in 1941, including a bunkered lock. (Elsewhere in the reference, it states that "the excavations" for the bunkered lock were begun in October 1942).

47°16′33″N 02°12′09″W

The pens were not affected by the British commando raid in March 1942, whose main objective were the Normandie dock gates.

=== Norway ===
Submarine pen construction was often hampered by snow and ice, and the prioritization of French submarine pen construction. With the liberation of France in 1944, Norway regained its importance, but for late in the war and past the prime of the U-boat's capabilities.

The Norwegian bunkers in Bergen and Trondheim were originally designed to have two floors, the lower one for U-boats, the upper one for accommodation, workshops and offices. However, with the project running six months late, plans for the second story were abandoned.

==== Bergen ====
Control of the Bergen project came under the German Naval Dockyard. Construction of "Bruno" commenced in 1941, with a Munich-based firm taking the lead. A shortage of labour, along with the acquisition of raw materials in sufficient quantities and poor weather, caused persistent problems. Specialized machinery and materials that could withstand harsh Norwegian winters had to be imported.

Granite blocks were added to reinforce the bunker's strength. However, a cement shortage led to these one cubic meter-sized blocks being placed insecurely, minimizing their protective effect.

==== Trondheim ====
"Dora I" was started in 1941, shortly after Operation Barbarossa, the German invasion of the Soviet Union. It was constructed by Soviet prisoners of war. Despite any number of precautions being taken when putting in the foundations, "Dora I" developed a noticeable sag of 15 cm (5.9 in), but it is believed to have little effect on submarine operations. Work on "Dora II" started in 1942, but was not completed by the end of the war.

== The Allied bombing offensive ==
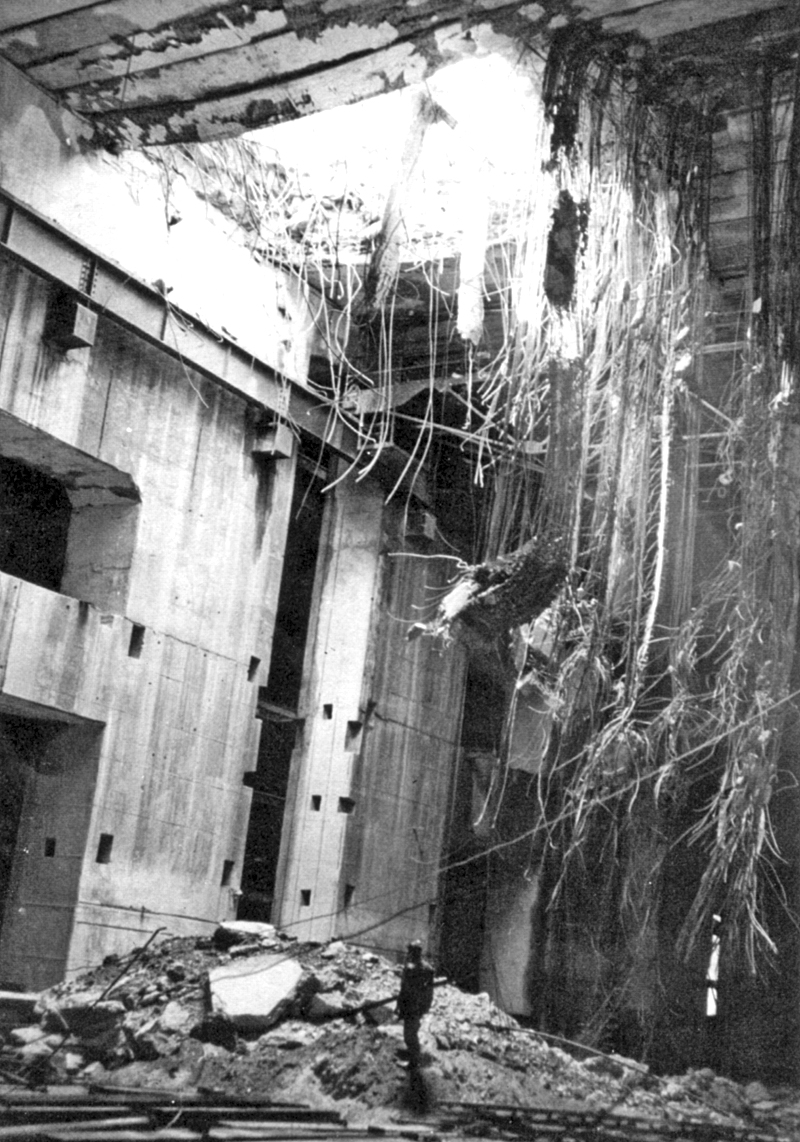
Destruction to a U-boat pen caused by the Grand Slam bomb, a larger version of the Tallboy (1944)

U-boat facilities first became a bombing priority in March 1941, and again during the Combined Bomber Offensive. The bunkers did not suffer as much as their surroundings until August 1944 when a new type of bomb was used against them, the "Tallboy" bomb.

U-boat yards and pens were the primary objectives for the US Eighth Air Force from late 1942 to early 1943. In the course of the war, the Allies used various tactics and weaponry against German U-boat pens. For example, The United States Army Air Forces, as part of Operation Aphrodite, used US designed and operated radio-controlled aircraft, "Bat" guided bombs. Whereas the RAF Bomber Command, used the Royal Navy designed "Disney" rocket-assisted bombs, and the Barnes Wallis-devised Tallboy and Grand Slam deep penetration bombs.

Allied bombardments of naval bases in France by base (1940-44)
Base	Bombardment (tonnes)	Bombardment (percentage)
Bordeaux	3,718 tonnes	13.77%
Brest	9,462 tonnes	35%
La Rochelle	1,926 tonnes	7.1%
Lorient	6,838 tonnes	25.3%
Saint-Nazaire	5,058 tonnes	18.7%

Bombing of U-boat pens and yards during World War II
Target	Date	Details
Saint-Nazaire	15/16 February 1942	10 Armstrong Whitworth Whitleys and six Handley Page Halifaxes; only nine aircraft bombed St Nazaire, in cloudy conditions. No aircraft were lost but three crashed in England
St-Nazaire	7/8 March 1942	17 aircraft bombed St Nazaire
St-Nazaire	25/26 March 1942	Minor Operations: 27 aircraft to St Nazaire—one Vickers Wellington lost
St-Nazaire	27/28 March 1942	35 Whitleys and 27 Wellingtons bombed German positions around St Nazaire in support of the naval and Commando raid to destroy the Normandie dock gates in the port. The submarine pens were incidental to the raid which was aimed at preventing use of the dry-dock by capital ships. The aircraft were ordered to bomb only if the target had clear visibility. Conditions were bad, however, with 10/10ths cloud and icing, only four aircraft bombed at St Nazaire. Six aircraft bombed elsewhere. One Whitley was lost at sea
St-Nazaire	3 January 1943	The first use of Lieutenant Colonel Curtis LeMay's modification of formation bombing to staggered three-plane elements within a squadron and staggered squadrons within a group was the "sixth raid on Saint Nazaire". With LeMay in command of the 305th Bomb Wing, 76 of 101 dispatched aircraft found the target and used a straight and level bomb run. Seven aircraft were shot down and 47 were damaged. The majority of bombs hit the submarine pens
Lorient	15 January 1943	The 317th air raid on Lorient dropped 20,000 incendiary bombs
St-Nazaire	16 January 1943	Two waves of B-17 Flying Fortresses inflicted major damage and killed 27 people
Wilhelmshaven	27 January 1943	The US VIII Bomber Command dispatched ninety-one B-17s and B-24 Liberators to attack the U-boat construction yards at Wilhelmshaven, the very first 8th Air Force heavy bomber attack directed at Germany itself. Three bombers (one B-17 and two B-24s) were shot down, only 53 aircraft actually dropped their bombs on the target due to bad weather conditions
Lorient	23 and 26 January; 3, 4, 7, 13 and 16 February; 6 March; 16 April; 17 May 1943	Lorient was bombed and the city was evacuated
Bremen	3/4 June 1943	170 aircraft attacked in the first large raid on Bremen since October 1941. 11 aircraft – four Wellingtons, two Halifaxes, two Avro Lancasters, two Short Stirlings and one Avro Manchester were lost. Bremen recorded this as a heavy attack, the results of which exceeded all previous raids. Housing areas were badly hit with six streets affected by serious fires. Damage to the U-boat construction yards and the Focke-Wulf factory was described as "of no importance" but there were hits in the harbour area which damaged a pier, some warehouses and the destroyer Z25. 83 people were killed, 29 were seriously injured and 229 slightly injured (Bremen's third heaviest casualty toll in the war)
Wilhelmshaven	11 June 1943	VIII Bomber Command, Mission Number 62: 252 B-17s were dispatched against the "U-boat yard at Wilhelmshaven" and the port area at Cuxhaven; 218 hit the targets; VIII Bomber Command claimed 85-20-24 Luftwaffe aircraft, with the loss of eight aircraft and 62 damaged. American casualties were 3 KIA, 20 wounded, and 80 MIA. The raid on Wilhelmshaven demonstrated the difficulty of operating beyond the range of escort fighters as enemy fighter attacks prevented accurate bombing of the target
Bremen and Kiel	13 June 1943	VIII Bomber Command, Mission Number 63: 151 B-17s were dispatched against the Bremen U-boat yards; 122 hit the target, claiming 2-2-1 Luftwaffe aircraft, with four lost and 31 damaged; casualties were eight WIA and 32 MIA. A smaller force of 76 B-17s was dispatched to the Kiel U-boat yards; 60 hit the target and claimed 39-5-14 Luftwaffe aircraft; Bomber Command lost 22 aircraft, one was damaged beyond repair and 23 were damaged. The heaviest fighter attacks to date against the Eighth Air Force accounted for 26 B-17s, mostly of the force attacking Kiel
St-Nazaire	28 June 1943	VIII Bomber Command, Mission Number 69: 191 B-17s were dispatched against the "locks and submarine pens at Saint-Nazaire"; 158 hit the target. Bomber Command claimed 28-6-8 Luftwaffe aircraft, for the loss of eight B-17s and 57 damaged
Bergen and Trondheim	24 July 1943	95th Bomb Group, Mission Number 75: First USAAF bombing raid on Norway. 84 B-17s are dispatched against the port area of Bergen, they find 10/10 cloud cover and return to base with their bombs. 45 B-17s are dispatched against the port area of Trondheim, which includes the Dora I submarine pens which have just been placed in service; 41 hit the target, they claim 4-2-3 Luftwaffe aircraft; one B-17 is damaged beyond repair and nine others damaged; casualties were three wounded. Workshops in the area are destroyed, there was large material damage including on civilian targets; German reports indicate three months delay in construction plans which includes a second set of partially built submarine pens Dora II. Damage to existing submarine pens (Dora I) is light. 31 Germans and 8 Norwegian civilians are killed. The U-622 was badly damaged and sunk near Trondheim. It was one of the only U-boats sunk by high-level bombing during World War II.
Deutsche Werke, Kiel	December 1943	B-17 and B-24 bombing destroyed one workshop (100%), another workshop and storage building (80%), a factory workshop and boat building (67%); a number of other buildings were damaged; a submarine under construction and workshops for engines and engineering were hit
Deutsche Werke, Kiel	23/24 July 1944	In the first major raid on a German city for two months, 629 aircraft – including 10 de Havilland Mosquitos – were dispatched in this first RAF (since April 1943) and heaviest RAF raid of the war on the target. In less than half an hour, all parts of Kiel were hit but the bombing was particularly heavy in the port areas and all of the important "U-boat yards" and naval facilities were hit. The presence of around 500 delayed-action or unexploded bombs caused severe problems for the rescue and repair services. There was no water for three days; trains and buses did not run for eight days; and there was no gas for cooking for three weeks
Brest	5 August 1944	15 Lancasters of No. 617 Squadron RAF, with two supporting Mosquitos, attacked the U-boat pens and scored six direct hits with Tallboy bombs penetrating the concrete roofs. One Lancaster was shot down by flak. Subsequent attempts to reinforce other sites with even thicker concrete diverted resources from other projects.
Lorient	6 August 1944	617 Squadron attacked Lorient again, with two hits.
Lorient	7 August 1944	The Tallboy bombing mission to Lorient was scrubbed
La Pallice	8 August 1944	Iveson dropped one Tallboy bomb
La Pallice and Bordeaux	11 August 1944	53 Lancasters and three Mosquitos of No 5 Group RAF attacked U-boat pens at "Bordeaux and La Pallice" with 2,000 lb armour-piercing bombs, but the bombs did not penetrate the roofs. No aircraft were lost
Brest, La Pallice, and Bordeaux	12 August 1944	68 Lancasters of No 1 Group and two Mosquitos of No 5 Group attacked "pens at Brest, La Pallice, and Bordeaux" without loss. A U-boat was believed to have been hit at La Pallice
Brest	13 August 1944	28 Lancasters and one Mosquito of No 5 Group attacked the "U-boat pens and shipping at Brest". Hits were claimed on the pens, on the hulk of an old French battleship, the Clemenceau and on a medium-sized tanker. The object of the attacks on ships was to prevent the Germans using any of the vessels in Brest to block the harbour just before its capture by American troops
La Pallice and Bordeaux	16 August 1944	25 Lancasters and one Mosquito of No 5 Group to attack the U-boat pens at La Pallice found the target was cloud-covered and only three aircraft bombed. No aircraft were lost
La Pallice	17 August 1944	Mission 559: A B-17 dropped "Bat" guided bombs on La Pallice. One impacted 1 mile (1.6 km) short and the second about 1 mile to the right of the target
IJmuiden	28 August 1944	Iveson dropped one Tallboy
Heligoland	3 September 1944	The US Navy controller flew the Operation Aphrodite SAU-1 drone (B-24D 42-63954) into Duene Island by mistake
Heligoland	11 September 1944	During the first Castor mission of Operation Aphrodite, the pilot of B-17 42-30180 (Guzzlers) was killed when his parachute failed to open on bailout 41-24340 to 41-30847, 42-001 to 42-30031, 42-30032 to 42-39757, 42-39758 to 42-50026, 42-57213 to 42-70685
Bergen	4 October 1944	The first of the three attacks against the U-boat pen "Bruno" came in the morning. The attack was carried out by 140 British bombers and 12 Mosquitoes, and most of the 1,432 bombs dropped weighed 1,000 lb (450 kg), the rest 500 lb (230 kg). The construction of Bruno was then running behind schedule and was never more than 80 percent finished. Still, after D-day it became increasingly important, and at times 200 U-boats lay hidden in fjords around Bergen. Bruno received seven hits, but in spite of its unfinished roof the damage was insignificant, whereas the adjoining Danziger Werft was seriously ravaged with sunken U-boats and the destruction of valuable equipment. In the harbour some ships were sunk. At first visibility was excellent, but deteriorated rapidly due to artificial fog and the smoke from numerous fires. As it turned out the attack was not the precision bombing as it was intended to be, and 193 civilians were killed, and a considerable number wounded. The worst tragedy was that Holen school was hit, situated about a hundred meters from Bruno. 61 children and 19 adults were killed while 240 pupils and 20 adults survived, but many of them have had serious psychological problems owing to the traumatic experience.
Heligoland	15 October 1944	Mission 678A: Two B-17s of Operation Aphrodite attacked the Heligoland U-boat pens
Bergen	28/29 October 1944	237 Lancasters and seven Mosquitos of No 5 Group attacked the U-boat pens at Bergen. The area was cloud-covered, therefore the Master Bomber tried to bring the force down below 5,000 ft but cloud was still encountered and he ordered the raid to be abandoned after only 47 Lancasters had bombed. Three Lancasters were lost
Heligoland	30 October 1944	Mission 693A: One Castor Operation Aphrodite drone lost contact, went out of control and crashed near Trollhättan, Sweden. The other drone was B-17 42-3438
Trondheim	22 November 1944	Lancaster bombing raid on Trondheim. 171 bomber raid on Trondheim which includes the in service Dora I submarine pens and Dora II which is still under construction. Bombers turned back and did not drop their bombs because of the low cloud cover/fog and smoke laying by the Germans.
IJmuiden	15 December 1944	17 Lancasters attacked with Tallboy bombs but the target was obscured by a smokescreen
IJmuiden	30 December 1944	13 Lancasters of No. 617 Squadron set out to bomb the "U-boat pens at IJmuiden" but the raid was abandoned because of bad weather
IJmuiden	12 January 1945	No. 617 Squadron attacked the U-boat pens with Tallboys, but smoke obscured the results
Bergen	12 January 1945	32 Lancasters and one Mosquito of No 9 and No. 617 Squadrons attacked "U-boat pens and shipping in Bergen harbour". Three Lancasters of No 617 Squadron and one from No. 9 Squadron were lost; the Germans told the local people that 11 bombers had been shot down. A local report says that three Tallboys penetrated the 3.5-metre-thick roof of the pens and caused severe damage to workshops, offices, and stores
IJmuiden and Poortershaven	3 February 1945	36 Lancasters attacked "U-boat pens at IJmuiden" (No. 9 Squadron) and "Poortershaven" (No. 617 Squadron) with Tallboy bombs without loss. Hits were claimed on both targets
IJmuiden	8 February 1945	15 Lancasters of 617 Squadron dropped Tallboys on the "U-boat pens at IJmuiden" without loss
IJmuiden	10 February 1945	Mission 825: nine of 164 B-17s on a 92nd Bombardment Group mission against the U-boat pens at IJmuiden, the Netherlands, first used the Royal Navy Disney rocket-boosted concrete piercing bomb
Oslo Fjord	23/24 February 1945	73 Lancasters and 10 Mosquitos carried out an accurate attack on a "possible U-boat base at Horten on the Oslo Fjord". One Lancaster was lost
Bremen (Farge)	27 March 1945	20 Lancasters of 617 Squadron attacked the Valentin submarine pens, two Grand Slam bombs penetrated two metres and detonated which rendered the shelter unusable. No aircraft were lost.
Bremen	30 March 1945	303rd BG (H) Combat Mission No. 348: 38 aircraft were dispatched to bomb Bremen. The "submarine building yards" were the first priority target (PDF)
Hamburg/Finkenwerder	4 April 1945	
Hamburg	9 April 1945	17 aircraft of 617 Squadron, with Grand Slam and Tallboy bombs, successfully attacked the "U-boat shelters". No aircraft were lost
Kiel	9/10 April 1945	591 Lancasters and eight Mosquitos of Nos 1, 3, and 8 Groups attacked Kiel. Three Lancasters were lost. This was an accurate raid, made in good visibility on two aiming points in the harbour area. Photographic reconnaissance showed that the Deutsche Werke U-boat yard was severely damaged, the German pocket battleship Admiral Scheer was hit and capsized, the cruisers Admiral Hipper and the Emden were badly damaged. The local diary says that "all three shipyards" in the port were hit and that nearby residential areas were severely damaged
Kiel	13/14 April 1945	377 Lancasters and 105 Halifaxes of Nos 3, 6, and 8 Groups attacked Kiel for two Lancasters lost. This raid was directed against the port area, with the "U-boat yards" as the main objective. RAF Bomber Command rated this as "a poor attack" with scattered bombing
Heligoland	18 April 1945	969 aircraft – 617 Lancasters, 332 Halifaxes, and 20 Mosquitos of all groups – successfully attacked the "Naval base, airfield, & town" "almost [creating a] crater-pitted moonscape". Three Halifaxes were lost, the islands were evacuated the following night
Heligoland	19 April 1945	No. 9 and 617 Squadrons used Tallboys against "coastal battery positions"

== Post war ==
=== Yugoslavia ===
The Yugoslav People's Army used submarine pens as well, including ones on the islands of Vis and Brač or in Kotor Bay, carved inside natural hills. The ones in Montenegro fulfilled their purpose, housing and protecting the submarines and missile boats from NATO aerial attacks during Operation Allied Force in 1999. They are now abandoned and freely accessible from sea or by foot.

Post-war submarine pens in Croatia

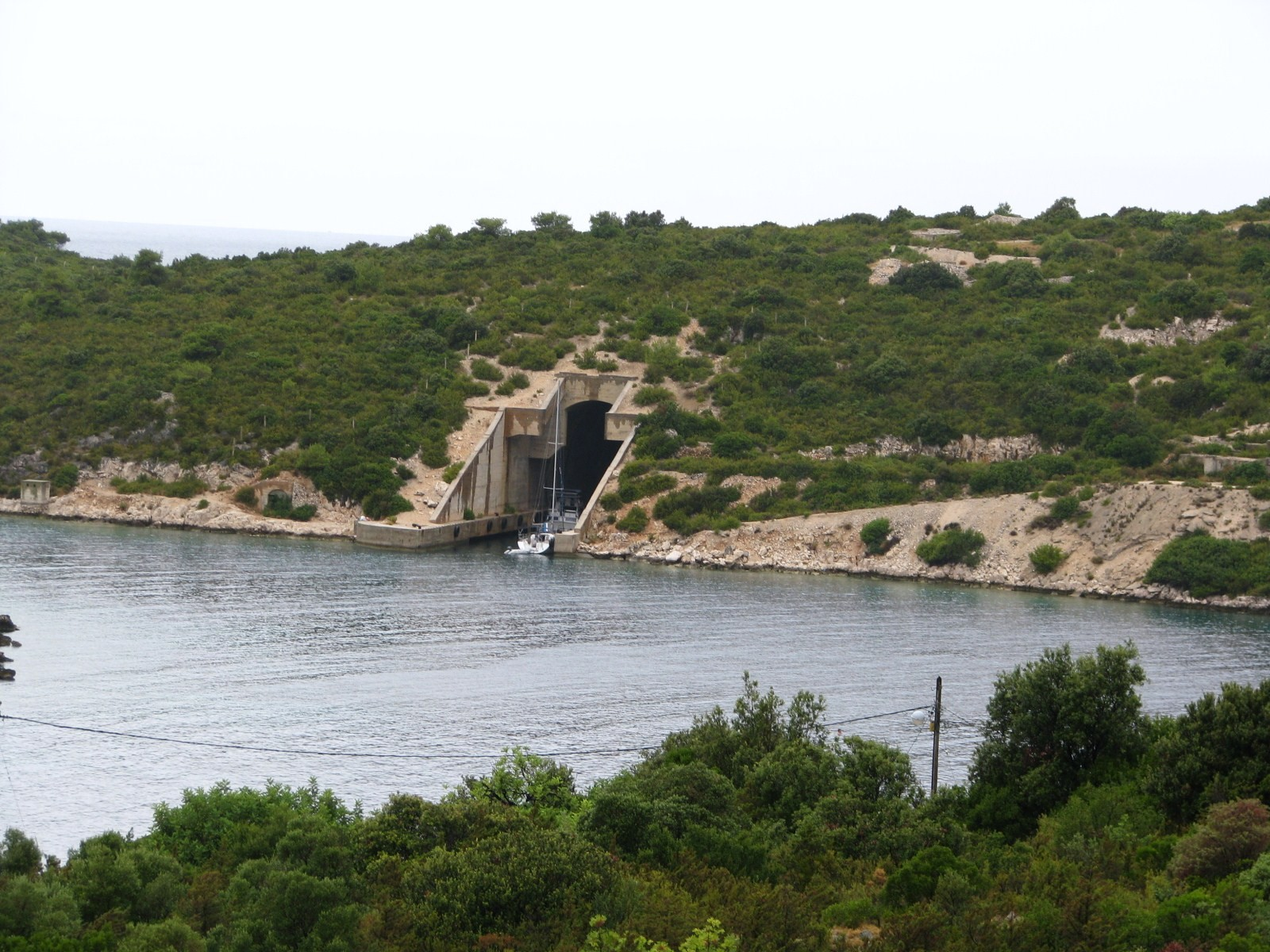
Vis - Location: 43°4′41.26″N 16°10′53.01″E

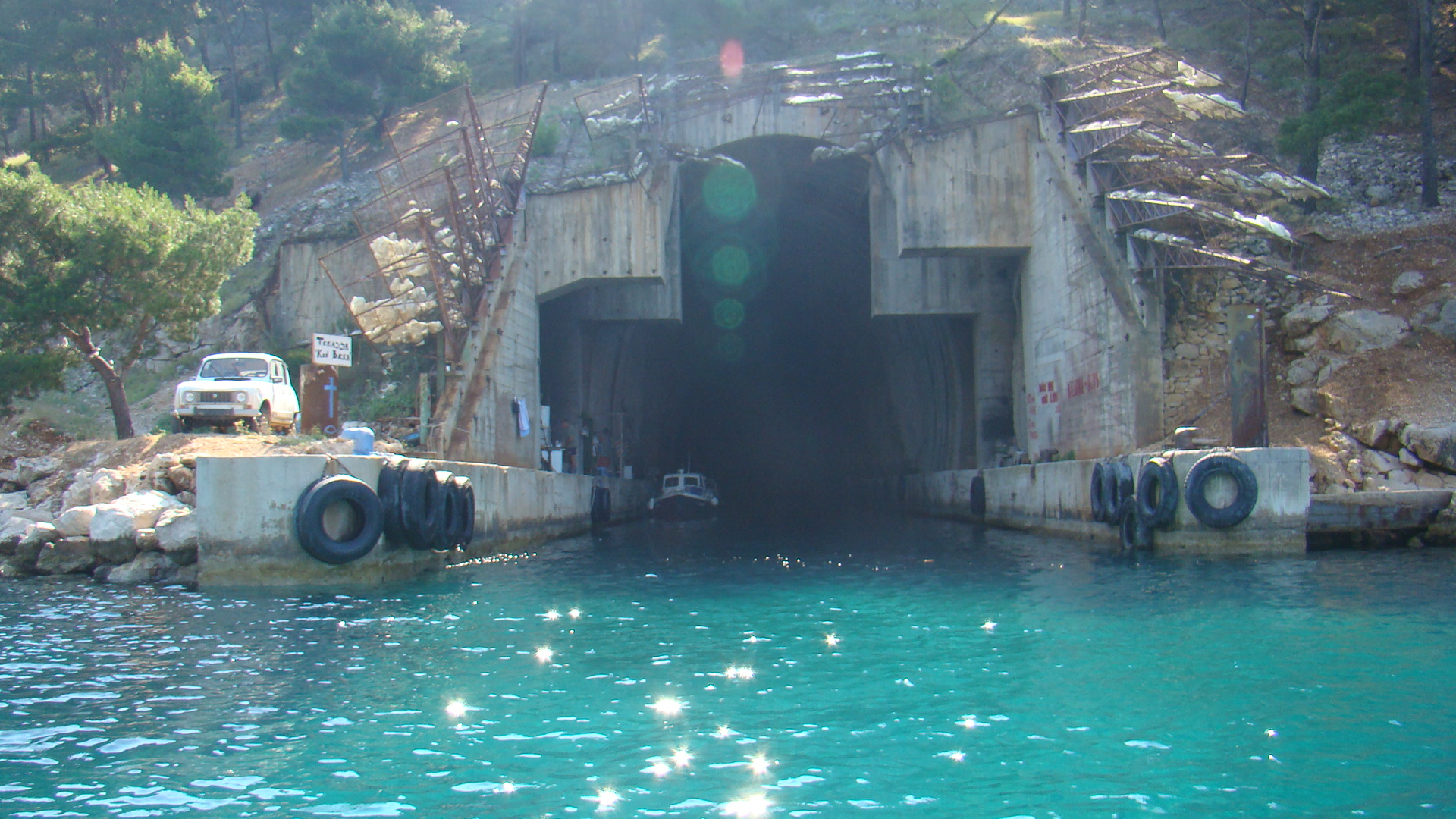
Brač

== See also ==
- Muskö Naval Base (Sweden)
- Naval museum complex Balaklava (includes several cold war era submarine pens)
- Yulin Naval Base (China)

== Bibliography ==
- Marcin Stąporek (2004). "Stocznia Cesarska" [Kaiser's Shipyard]. Wydział Morski (in Polish). Akademia Rzygaczy. Archived from the original on 4 March 2016.
