= IGSF6 =

Protein-coding gene in the species Homo sapiens

Identifiers
- Aliases: IGSF6, DORA, immunoglobulin superfamily member 6
- External IDs: OMIM: 606222; MGI: 1891393; GeneCards: IGSF6

Gene location (Human)
Chr.	Chromosome 16 (human)
Band	16p12.2	Start	21,639,550 bp
Band	16p12.2	End	21,652,608 bp

Gene location (Mouse)
Chr.	Chromosome 7 (mouse)
Band	7|7 F2	Start	120,663,290 bp
Band	7|7 F2	End	120,673,795 bp
RNA expression pattern
Bgee	Human / Mouse (ortholog); Top expressed in: monocyte; blood; granulocyte; appendix; spleen; lymph node; bone marrow cell; placenta; testicle; rectum / Top expressed in: granulocyte; spleen; bone marrow; liver; ileum; jejunum; lung; zone of skin; thymus; colon; More reference expression data
BioGPS	n/a
Gene ontology
Molecular function	transmembrane signaling receptor activity
Cellular component	integral component of membrane; integral component of plasma membrane; membrane
Biological process	cell surface receptor signaling pathway; immune response
Sources:Amigo / QuickGO
Orthologs
Databases	NCBI: entry; OMA: entry
Species	Human	Mouse
Entrez	10261	80719
Ensembl	ENSG00000140749	ENSMUSG00000035004
UniProt	O95976	P0C6B7
RefSeq (mRNA)	NM_005849	NM_030691
RefSeq (protein)	NP_005840	NP_109616
Location (UCSC)	Chr 16: 21.64 – 21.65 Mb	Chr 7: 120.66 – 120.67 Mb
PubMed search
- Wikidata
View/Edit Human	View/Edit Mouse

IGSF6 is a protein that in humans is encoded by the IGSF6 gene.

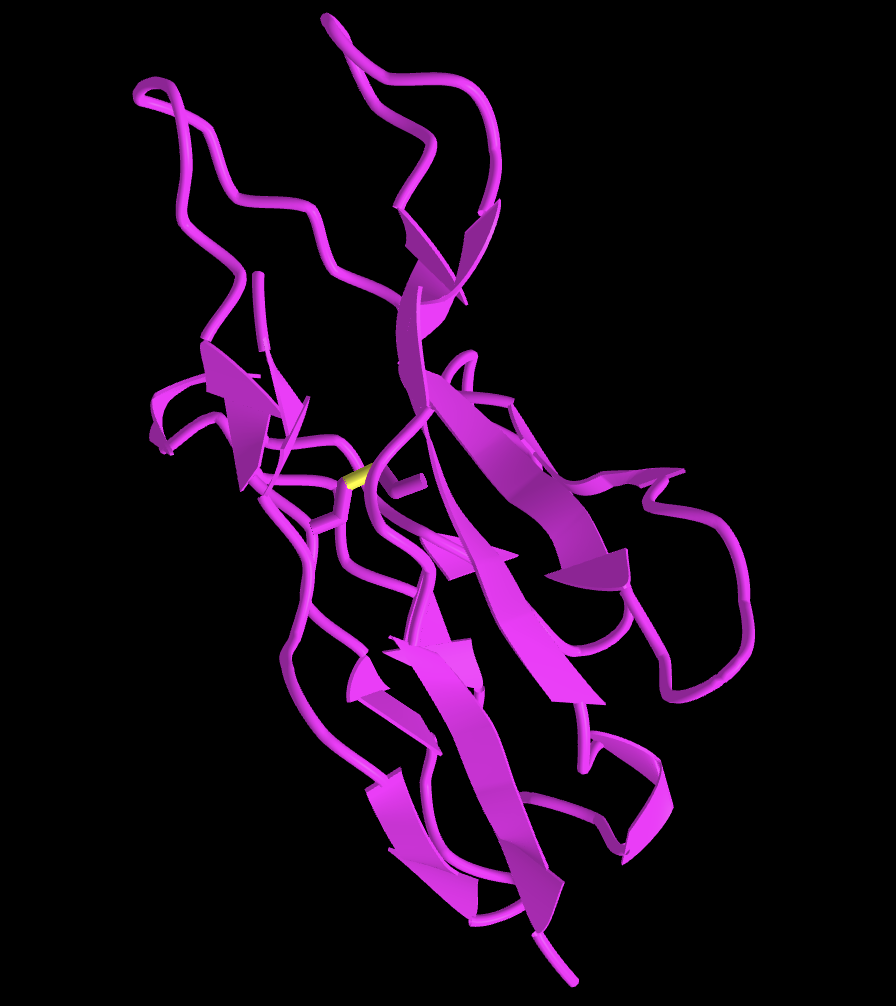
Predicted IGSF6 Model from Phyre Viewed with iCN3D.

== Overview ==
In humans, the immunoglobulin superfamily member 6 (IGSF6) gene with alias DORA encodes CD8 protein IGSF6 (24 kDA) with orthologs in mammals, birds, reptiles, and bony fishes. IGSF6 is located on the complement strand of chromosome 16 (16p12.2) spanning 13059 base pairs and is located entirely within an intron of the gene METTL9. IGSF6 is predicted to be an integral component of the plasma membrane and contribute to immune response. It is also predicted to be involved in cell surface receptor signaling and enable transmembrane signaling receptor activity. IGSF6 gene was localized to a locus associated with inflammatory bowel disease (IBD). However, there was no association with single nucleotide polymorphisms (SNPs) and IBD in patients with the disease.

== Gene ==
A common alias for IGSF6 is downregulated by activation (DORA). The cytogenic location is on chromosome 16 (16p12.2). IGSF6 has 6 exons total. The span of the gene is 13059 base pairs.

== Proteins ==
The theoretical isoelectric point (pI) and molecular weight (mw) for the IGSF6 protein are 8.9 and 27 kDa, respectively, before any modification. The pI of the protein is not consistent throughout, as the N-terminal half has a lower pI than the C-terminal half. IGSF6 is neutral at 8.93 and would be negative around 7.

Eukaryotic Linear Motif (ELM) was used to find protein Motifs. The list ELM provided was after globular domain filtering, structural filtering, and context filtering. The four Motifs shown are organized by probability and are conserved in mammalian orthologs.

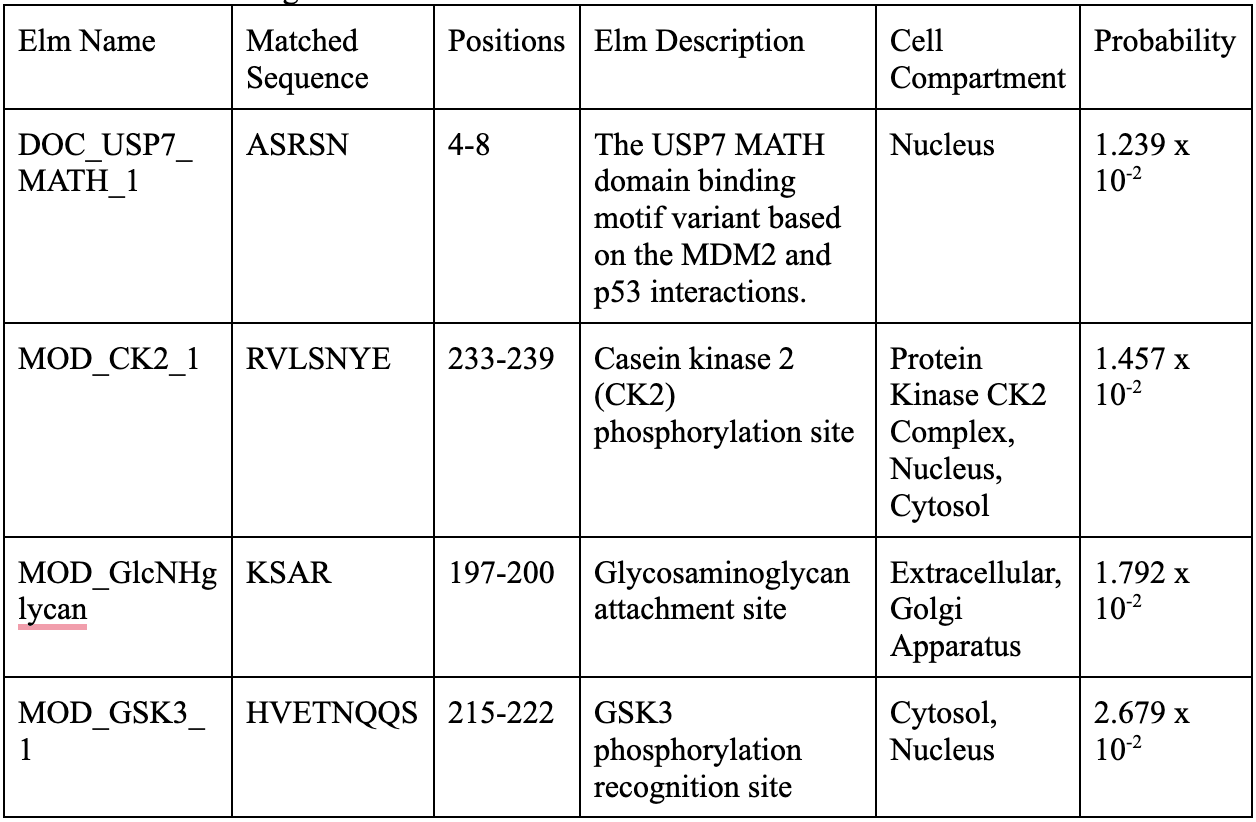
ELM Binding Motifs for IGSF6.

=== Structure ===
The secondary structure of IGSF6 is predicted to have regions of coils, strands, and alpha helices. The most pronounced helix regions occur from amino acids 149-178 and amino acids 197-218.

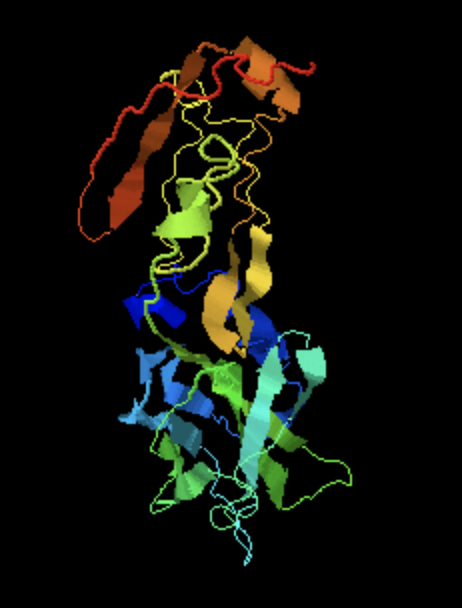
I-TASSER predicted three-dimensional structure of IGSF6.

IGSF6 contains a transmembrane domain from amino acids 154 to 176. The predicted disulfide bonds were found using DiANNA.

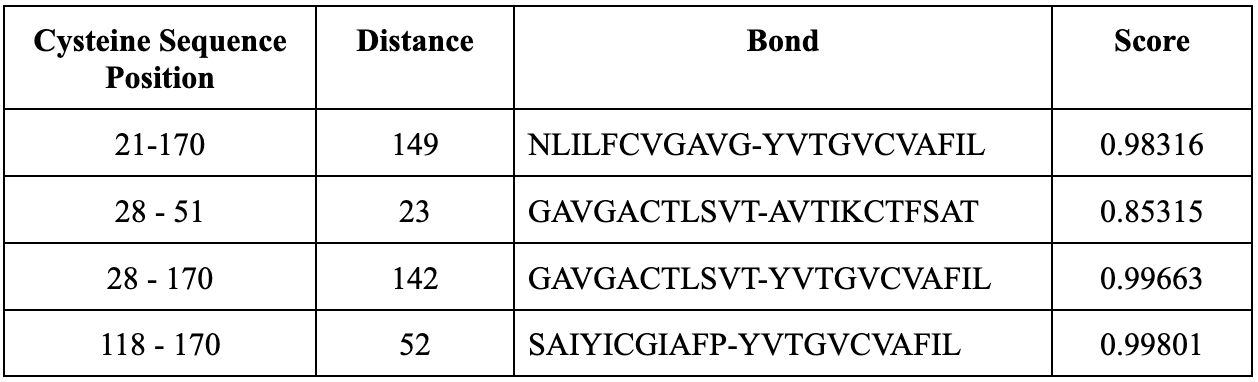
Predicted disulfide bonding patterns from DiANNA.

== Gene Level Regulation ==
=== Expression Pattern ===
IGSF6 is highly expressed in white blood cells and secondary lymphoid organs including the lymph nodes and spleen. The mRNA abundance across 20 human tissues is low. The micro-array assessed tissue expression patterns showed high expression in ganglia, monocytes, and myeloid tissue. In situ hybridization showed that the regulation of IGSF6 was low and ubiquitously expressed in the mouse brain. Proteins are localized in the human testis and thyroid.

=== Promotor and Transcription Factors ===
The promotor region and transcription factors are shown in the promotor diagram. The transcription factors shown were highly conserved in animal orthologs of IGSF6.

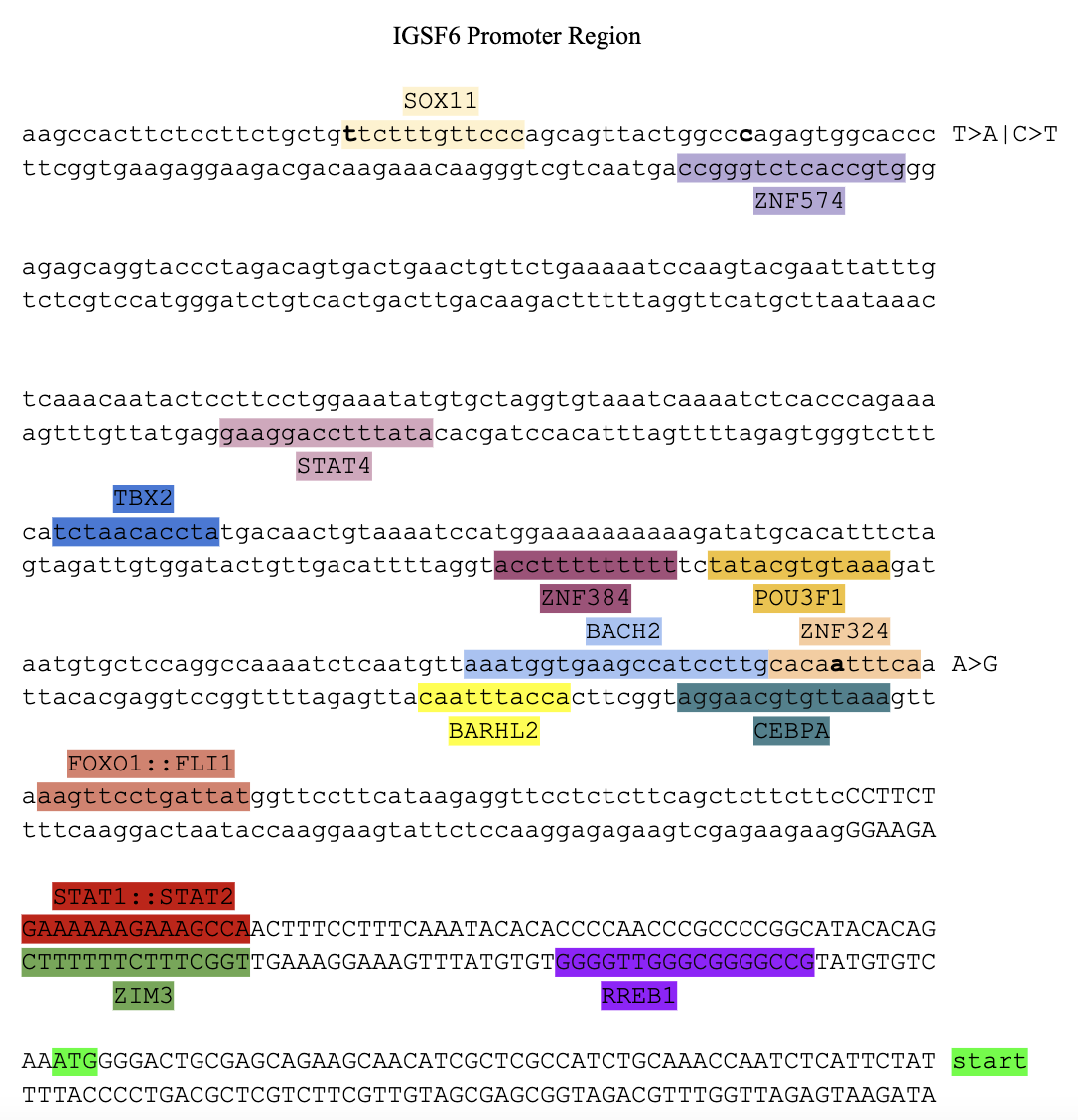
IGSF6 Promotor Diagram.

== Protein Level Regulation ==
The IGSF6 protein is predicted to be in the plasma membrane. IGSF6 has a signal peptide from amino acids 17 to 32. IGSF6 has post-translational modifications including phosphorylation sites and lysine acetylation sites. The phosphorylation sites at amino acid positions 3, 5, 91, 193, 198, 222, and 236, and these sites are important in enzymatic function. The lysine acetylation sites are at amino acids 187, 195, 196, 213, and 224, and they are important in gene expression, protein–protein interactions, and protein processing and degradation. IGSF6 has a SUMOylation site at amino acid 190.

== Homology and Evolution ==
=== Paralogs ===
The only paralog of IGSF6 is T cell receptor beta variable 28 (TCRBV28). Birds are the most distant organism that TRBV28 is found in, so the gene duplication to create the paralog occurred about 320 million years ago. TRBV28 is a quickly evolving gene, as it evolves similarly to fibrinogen alpha.

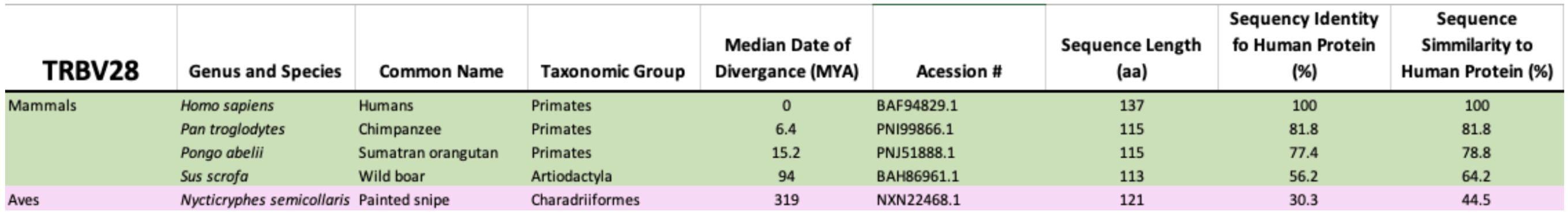
IGSF6 Paralog Table.

=== Orthologs ===
The orthologs of IGSF6 were found through NCBI protein and sorted by median date of divergence and sequence identity to the human protein. The IGSF6 protein is found only in vertebrates with the H. sapiens IGSF6 protein being most distantly related to the fish IGSF6 protein. The human IGSF6 protein is most closely related to the IGSF6 protein of other mammals. Aves, reptiles, amphibians, and fish proteins have an average sequence similarity to the human protein of 52%, 50%, 50%, and 45% respectively. IGSF6 is a fast-evolving gene because it evolves similarly to fibrinogen alpha.

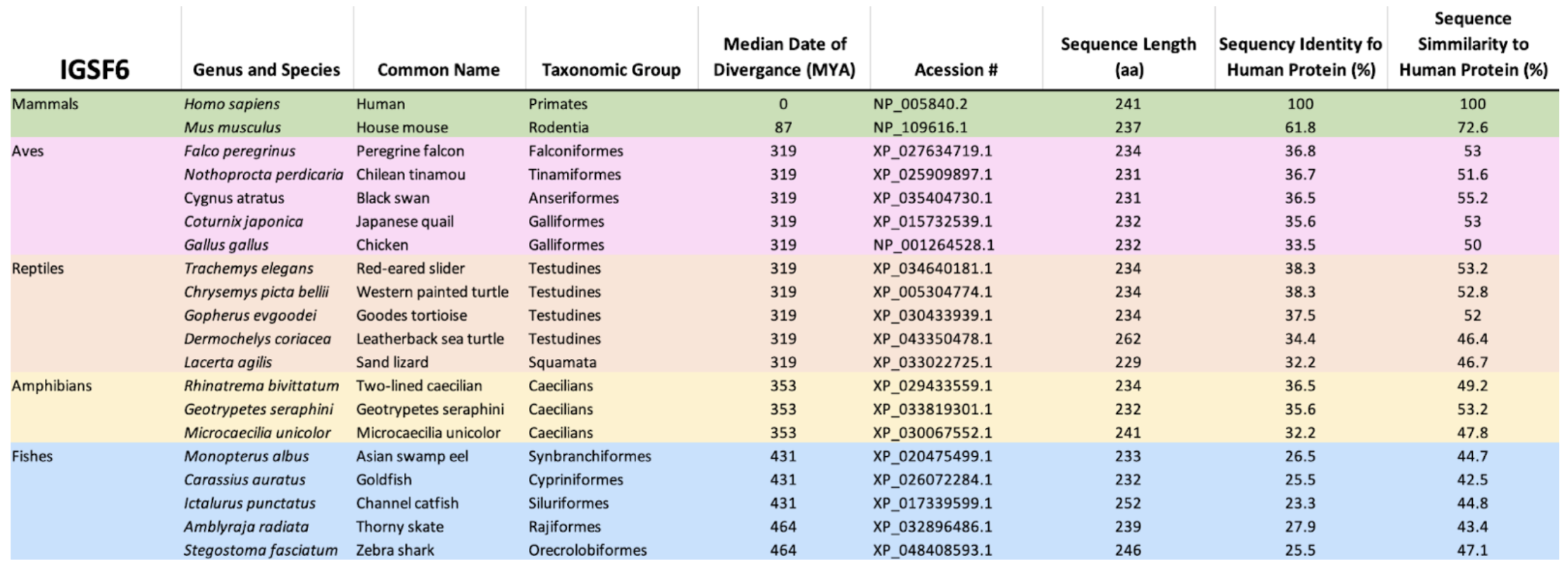
IGSF6 Ortholog Table.

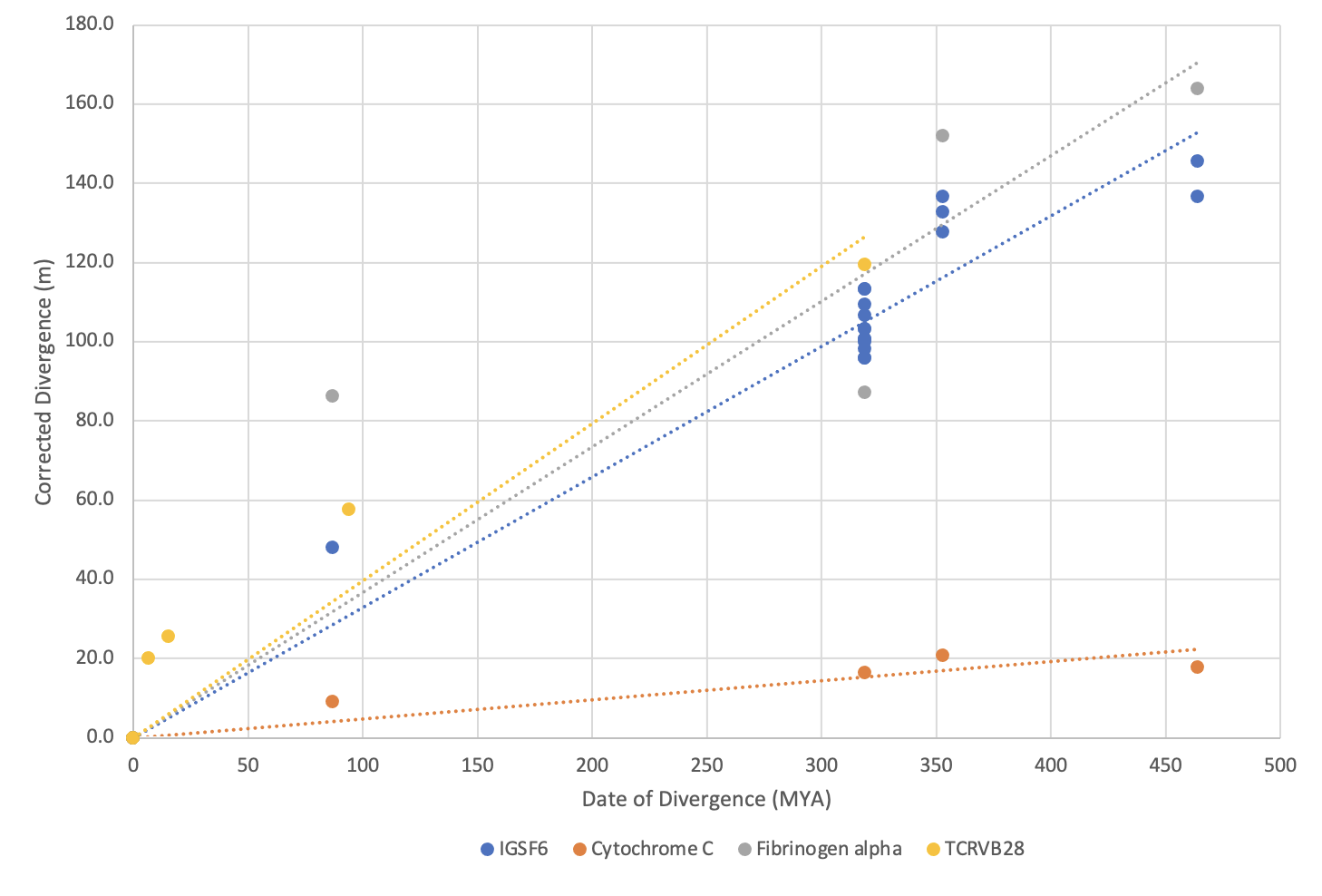
Graph of IGSF6 Showing Rate of Evolution Compared to Other Genes and Proteins.

== Interacting Proteins ==
The most likely protein to interact with IGSF6 is methyltransferase-like protein 9 (METTL9) because IGSF6 is in an intron of METTL9. Most of the proteins that IGSF6 interacts with have immunological functions.

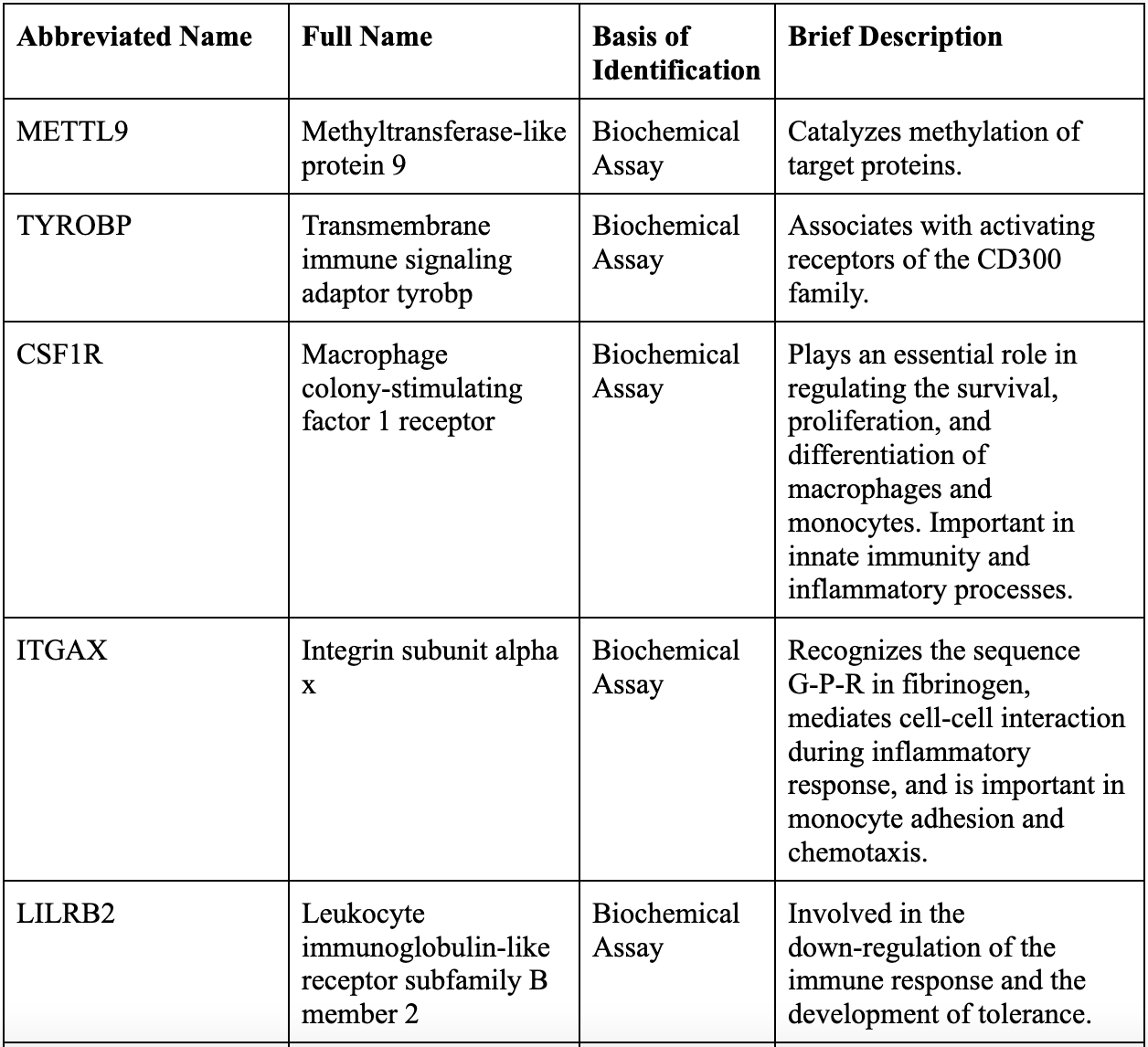
Proteins that IGSF6 Interacts With.

== Clinical Significance ==
IGSF6 is predicted to be involved in immunological response. Its high expression in white blood cells and secondary lymphoid organs support this. IGSF6 has been associated with several diseases and conditions.

=== Inflammatory Bowel Disease ===
The human IGSF6 gene was localized to a locus associated with inflammatory bowel disease. IGSF6 has been researched as a possible indicator of inflammatory bowel disease (IBD) susceptibility. However, there was no association with single nucleotide polymorphisms (SNPs) and IBD in patients with the disease.

=== Esophageal Squamous Cell Carcinoma ===
The combined expression of IGSF6 and nine other genes was significantly related to the overall and disease-free survival in patients with esophageal squamous cell carcinoma.

=== Multiple Sclerosis ===
IGSF6 was found to be upregulated in the myeloid cells function pathway in patients with multiple sclerosis, a chronic autoimmune demyelinating disease of the central nervous system.
