= Tributaries of Redbank Creek =

The Tributaries of Redbank Creek drain parts of Jefferson, Clarion, and Armstrong counties, Pennsylvania. The following table lists all the named tributaries of Redbank Creek (Pennsylvania), a tributary of the Allegheny River. For each stream, the name, tributary number, coordinate and political subdivision of the confluence, and coordinate of the source are given.

== Direct tributaries ==
Name	Number	Bank	Mouth	Political subdivision	Source	Political subdivision
Sandy Lick Creek	1	Left	41°09′30″N 79°04′36″W (elev. 1,194 feet (364 m))	Brookville, Pennsylvania	41°11′44″N 78°40′19″W	Sandy Township, Clearfield County
North Fork Creek	2	Right	41°09′30″N 79°04′36″W (elev. 1,194 feet (364 m))	Brookville, Pennsylvania	41°19′07″N 78°53′59″W	Polk Township, Jefferson County
Clement Run	3	Right	41°08′37″N 79°06′56″W (elev. 1,188 feet (362 m))	Rose Township, Jefferson County	41°10′34″N 79°06′16″W	Rose Township, Jefferson County
Rattlesnake Run	4	Left	41°08′04″N 79°08′36″W (elev. 1,175 feet (358 m))	Clover Township, Jefferson County	41°06′45″N 79°06′39″W	Rose Township, Jefferson County
Thompson Run	5	Right	41°07′59″N 79°09′02″W (elev. 1,168 feet (356 m))	Clover Township, Jefferson County	41°09′12″N 79°09′36″W	Clover Township, Jefferson County
Simpson Run	6	Right	41°08′00″N 79°09′25″W (elev. 1,171 feet (357 m))	Clover Township, Jefferson County	41°10′16″N 79°11′02″W	Union Township, Jefferson County
Welch Run	7	Right	41°07′29″N 79°10′53″W (elev. 1,158 feet (353 m))	Clover Township, Jefferson County	41°10′49″N 79°11′51″W	Corsica
Runaway Run	8	Right	41°06′58″N 79°11′44″W (elev. 1,138 feet (347 m))	Summerville	41°09′47″N 79°13′10″W	Limestone Township, Clarion County
Carrier Run	9	Left	41°06′32″N 79°11′58″W (elev. 1,138 feet (347 m))	Clover Township, Jefferson County	41°06′55″N 79°10′35″W	Clover Township, Jefferson County
Beaver Run	10	Left	41°05′21″N 79°10′57″W (elev. 1,129 feet (344 m))	Beaver Township, Jefferson County	41°03′47″N 79°05′41″W	Oliver Township, Jefferson County
Tarkiln Run	11	Left	41°04′13″N 79°11′12″W (elev. 1,109 feet (338 m))	Beaver Township, Jefferson County	41°04′26″N 79°08′50″W	Beaver Township, Jefferson County
Red Run	12	Left	41°03′55″N 79°11′23″W (elev. 1,112 feet (339 m))	Beaver Township, Jefferson County	41°03′35″N 79°10′02″W	Beaver Township, Jefferson County
Patton Run	13	Right	41°03′32″N 79°12′13″W (elev. 1,093 feet (333 m))	Beaver Township, Jefferson County	41°05′40″N 79°12′55″W	Redbank Township, Clarion County
Little Sandy Creek	14	Left	41°02′44″N 79°13′48″W (elev. 1,083 feet (330 m))	Redbank Township, Armstrong County	41°01′39″N 78°57′31″W	McCalmont Township, Jefferson County
Pine Creek	15	Left	41°01′40″N 79°15′46″W (elev. 1,070 feet (330 m))	Redbank Township, Clarion County	41°07′23″N 79°13′09″W	Limestone Township, Clarion County
Miller Run	16	Right	41°02′28″N 79°14′14″W (elev. 1,079 feet (329 m))	Redbank Township, Clarion County	41°03′51″N 79°13′23″W	Redbank Township, Clarion County
Town Run	17	Right	41°00′49″N 79°18′03″W (elev. 1,056 feet (322 m))	Redbank Township, Clarion County	41°05′51″N 79°16′43″W	Redbank Township, Clarion County
Middle Run	18	Right	41°00′38″N 79°18′26″W (elev. 1,060 feet (320 m))	Redbank Township, Clarion County	41°03′19″N 79°18′33″W	Redbank Township, Clarion County
Leisure Run	19	Right	41°00′03″N 79°19′38″W (elev. 1,047 feet (319 m))	New Bethlehem	41°05′06″N 79°19′21″W	Redbank Township, Clarion County
Citizens Water Company Dam	20		41°00′06″N 79°20′05″W (elev. 1,066 feet (325 m))	New Bethlehem," "		
Long Run	21	Right	41°00′00″N 79°21′13″W (elev. 1,040 feet (320 m))	Porter Township, Clarion County	41°02′39″N 79°20′21″W	Porter Township, Clarion County
Leatherwood Creek	22	Right	40°59′39″N 79°23′20″W (elev. 981 feet (299 m))	Porter Township, Clarion County	41°05′34″N 79°20′05″W	Porter Township, Clarion County
Middle Run	23	Right	41°00′33″N 79°24′41″W (elev. 988 feet (301 m))	Porter Township, Clarion County	41°02′19″N 79°24′50″W	Porter Township, Clarion County
Rock Run	24	Right	40°59′22″N 79°25′27″W (elev. 942 feet (287 m))	Madison Township, Armstrong County	41°01′12″N 79°26′02″W	Porter Township, Clarion County
Wildcat Run	25	Right	40°59′44″N 79°29′19″W (elev. 873 feet (266 m))	Madison Township, Clarion County	41°03′20″N 79°28′30″W	Toby Township, Clarion County

== North Fork Creek ==
North Fork Creek

Name	Number	Bank	Mouth	Political subdivision	Source	Political subdivision

== Sandy Lick Creek ==
Sandy Lick Creek

Name	Number	Bank	Mouth	Political subdivision	Source	Political subdivision
Lake Sabula	1		41°09′28″N 78°39′58″W (elev. 1,460 feet (450 m))	Sandy Township, Clearfield County		
Coal Run	2	Left	41°08′26″N 78°40′59″W (elev. 1,430 feet (440 m))	Sandy Township, Clearfield County	41°07′52″N 78°38′48″W	Union Township
Muddy Run	3	Right	41°08′21″N 78°41′15″W (elev. 1,424 feet (434 m))	Sandy Township, Clearfield County	41°09′58″N 78°40′57″W	Sandy Township, Clearfield County
Narrows Creek	4	Right	41°07′59″N 78°41′45″W (elev. 1,421 feet (433 m))	Sandy Township, Clearfield County	41°12′17″N 78°41′40″W	Sandy Township, Clearfield County
Gravel Lick Run	5	Right	41°07′28″N 78°42′56″W (elev. 1,407 feet (429 m))	Sandy Township, Clearfield County	41°09′20″N 78°42′14″W	Sandy Township, Clearfield County
Laborde Branch	6	Left	41°07′05″N 78°43′41″W (elev. 1,401 feet (427 m))	Sandy Township, Clearfield County	41°03′35″N 78°42′21″W	Brady Township, Clearfield County
Reisinger Run	7	Left	41°07′06″N 78°45′13″W (elev. 1,398 feet (426 m))	DuBois, Pennsylvania	41°05′17″N 78°44′19″W	Brady Township, Clearfield County
Pentz Run	8	Left	41°07′21″N 78°45′47″W (elev. 1,398 feet (426 m))	DuBois	41°05′01″N 78°45′04″W	Brady Township, Clearfield County
Beaver Run	9	Right	41°07′30″N 78°45′45″W (elev. 1,398 feet (426 m))	DuBois	41°08′41″N 78°43′25″W	Sandy Township, Clearfield County
Clear Run	10	Right	41°07′40″N 78°46′13″W (elev. 1,398 feet (426 m))	DuBois	41°09′45″N 78°45′50″W	Sandy Township, Clearfield County
Slab Run	11	Right	41°08′14″N 78°47′22″W (elev. 1,384 feet (422 m))	Sandy Township, Clearfield County	41°09′53″N 78°46′13″W	Sandy Township, Clearfield County
Wolf Run	12	Right	41°08′14″N 78°47′35″W (elev. 1,381 feet (421 m))	Sandy Township, Clearfield County	41°11′54″N 78°42′46″W	Sandy Township, Clearfield County
Panther Run	13	Right	41°07′18″N 78°52′26″W (elev. 1,371 feet (418 m))	Winslow Township, Jefferson County	41°08′43″N 78°53′29″W	Washington Township, Jefferson County
Pitchpine Run	14	Left	41°05′47″N 78°53′33″W (elev. 1,358 feet (414 m))	Reynoldsville	41°06′47″N 78°51′15″W	Winslow Township, Jefferson County
Soldier Run	15	Left	41°05′21″N 78°53′33″W (elev. 1,352 feet (412 m))	Reynoldsville	41°05′20″N 78°47′13″W	Sandy Township, Clearfield County
Trout Run	16	Left	41°05′14″N 78°54′35″W (elev. 1,352 feet (412 m))	Winslow Township, Jefferson County	41°03′25″N 78°50′55″W	Winslow Township, Jefferson County
Schoolhouse Run	17	Left	41°05′29″N 78°55′24″W (elev. 1,345 feet (410 m))	Winslow Township, Jefferson County	41°07′48″N 78°54′08″W	Winslow Township, Jefferson County
O'Donnell Run	18	Right	41°05′46″N 78°56′22″W (elev. 1,345 feet (410 m))	Winslow Township, Jefferson County	41°08′17″N 78°55′16″W	Washington Township, Jefferson County
Camp Run	19	Left	41°05′19″N 78°58′00″W (elev. 1,325 feet (404 m))	Knox Township, Jefferson County	41°02′30″N 78°56′54″W	McCalmont Township, Jefferson County
Fuller Run	20	Left	41°05′51″N 78°59′21″W (elev. 1,302 feet (397 m))	Knox Township, Jefferson County	41°04′28″N 79°00′19″W	Knox Township, Jefferson County
Cable Run	21	Right	41°06′52″N 78°59′48″W (elev. 1,293 feet (394 m))	Pine Creek Township, Jefferson County	41°07′43″N 78°58′51″W	Pine Creek Township, Jefferson County
Mill Creek	22	Right	41°09′22″N 79°03′11″W (elev. 1,230 feet (370 m))	Pine Creek Township, Jefferson County	41°14′53″N 78°49′18″W	Snyder Township, Jefferson County
Horm Run	22.1	Left	41°10′31″N 78°56′26″W (elev. 1,460 feet (450 m))	Washington Township, Jefferson County	41°09′57″N 78°52′40″W	Washington Township, Jefferson County
Fivemile Run	22.2	Left	41°09′40″N 79°00′04″W (elev. 1,306 feet (398 m))	Pine Creek Township, Jefferson County	41°08′28″N 78°55′28″W	Washington Township, Jefferson County
Little Mill Creek	22.3	Right	41°09′44″N 79°02′01″W (elev. 1,250 feet (380 m))	Pine Creek Township	41°12′11″N 78°57′35″W	Warsaw Township
Fivemile Run	23	Left	41°08′54″N 79°04′32″W (elev. 1,224 feet (373 m))	Pine Creek Township, Jefferson County	41°06′11″N 79°01′41″W	Knox Township, Jefferson County

== Little Sandy Creek ==
Name	Number	Bank	Mouth	Political subdivision	Source	Political subdivision
Middle Branch Little Sandy Creek	1	Right	41°02′20″N 79°01′30″W (elev. 1,394 feet (425 m))	Oliver Township, Jefferson County	41°03′58″N 79°00′35″W	Knox Township, Jefferson County
Hickok Run	2	Left	41°02′04″N 79°01′54″W (elev. 1,362 feet (415 m))	Oliver Township, Jefferson County	41°01′50″N 79°00′04″W	McCalmont Township, Jefferson County
Clutch Run	3	Left	41°01′41″N 79°02′40″W (elev. 1,316 feet (401 m))	Oliver Township, Jefferson County	41°00′53″N 78°59′35″W	McCalmont Township, Jefferson County
Indiancamp Run	4	Right	41°01′56″N 79°03′01″W (elev. 1,299 feet (396 m))	Oliver Township, Jefferson County	41°04′59″N 79°01′32″W	Knox Township, Jefferson County
Lick Run	5	Right	41°02′42″N 79°05′22″W (elev. 1,234 feet (376 m))	Oliver Township, Jefferson County	41°04′39″N 79°05′28″W	Rose Township, Jefferson County
Big Run	6	Left	41°01′30″N 79°07′56″W (elev. 1,188 feet (362 m))	Ringgold Township, Jefferson County	40°58′16″N 79°02′03″W	Perry Township, Jefferson County
Ferguson Run	7	Right	41°02′06″N 79°10′12″W (elev. 1,155 feet (352 m))	Beaver Township, Jefferson County	41°03′37″N 79°07′56″W	Beaver Township, Jefferson County
Cherry Run	8	Left	41°01′58″N 79°11′05″W (elev. 1,142 feet (348 m))	Ringgold Township, Jefferson County	40°59′04″N 79°10′12″W	Ringgold Township, Jefferson County
Brocious Run	9	Right	41°02′25″N 79°12′06″W (elev. 1,132 feet (345 m))	Beaver Township, Jefferson County	41°02′58″N 79°11′23″W	Beaver Township, Jefferson County
Nolf Run	10	Left	41°02′21″N 79°13′06″W (elev. 1,109 feet (338 m))	Redbank Township, Armstrong County	41°00′11″N 79°12′24″W	Ringgold Township, Jefferson County

== See also ==
List of tributaries of the Allegheny River
