= Beaver Township, Jefferson County, Pennsylvania =

Township in Pennsylvania, US

Coordinates: 41°03′38″N 79°09′42″W

- Township
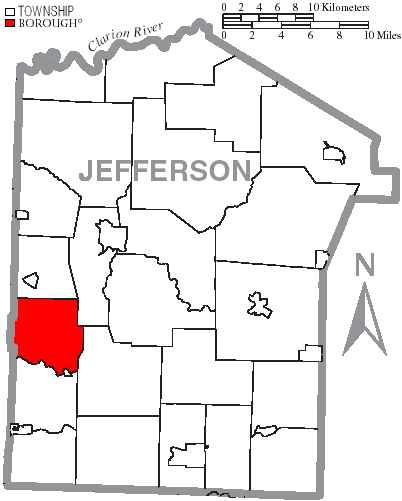
- Map of Jefferson County, Pennsylvania Highlighting Beaver Township

- Map of Jefferson County, Pennsylvania
- Country: United States
- State: Pennsylvania
- County: Jefferson
- Settled: 1816
- Incorporated: 1850

Government
  - Type: Township of the Second Class, having a three member board of Supervisors

Area
  - Total: 21.44 sq mi (55.54 km^{2})
  - Land: 21.20 sq mi (54.92 km^{2})
  - Water: 0.24 sq mi (0.62 km^{2})

Population (2020)
  - Total: 468
  - Estimate (2023): 461
  - Density: 22.1/sq mi (8.52/km^{2})
- Time zone: UTC-5 (Eastern (EST))
  - Summer (DST): UTC-4 (EDT)
- ZIP Code: Partially Mayport, 16240; and Summerville, 15864
- Area code: 814
- FIPS code: 42-065-04728

Beaver Township is a township in Jefferson County, Pennsylvania, United States. The population was 468 at the 2020 census, down from 498 at the 2010 census. It was named for Beaver Run, a stream which traverses the township from east to west.

== Geography ==
Beaver Township is in western Jefferson County and is bordered to the west by Clarion County and a small portion of Armstrong County. According to the United States Census Bureau, the township has a total area of 21.4 square miles (55.5 km^{2}), of which 21.2 square miles (54.9 km^{2}) are land and 0.2 square miles (0.6 km^{2}), or 1.11%, are water. Redbank Creek is the largest waterway, flowing southwesterly across the northwestern portion of the township. Little Sandy Creek forms the southern boundary of the township and flows west toward Redbank Creek. The entire township is located in the Allegheny River watershed.

The borough of Worthville borders the township to the southeast. There are several small, unincorporated communities in the township: Conifer, Heathville, Ohl, Pansy and Langville.

== Demographics ==
Historical population
Census	Pop.	Note	%±
1850	662		—
1860	874		32.0%
1870	1,094		25.2%
1880	1,113		1.7%
1890	993		−10.8%
1900	876		−11.8%
1910	1,439		64.3%
1920	1,449		0.7%
1930	736		−49.2%
1940	788		7.1%
1950	758		−3.8%
1960	570		−24.8%
1970	526		−7.7%
1980	524		−0.4%
1990	551		5.2%
2000	544		−1.3%
2010	498		−8.5%
2020	468		−6.0%
2023 (est.)	461		−1.5%
U.S. Decennial Census

As of the census of 2000, there were 544 people, 200 households, and 153 families residing in the township. The population density was 25.2 people per square mile (9.7/km^{2}). There were 234 housing units at an average density of 10.9/sq mi (4.2/km^{2}). The racial makeup of the township was 98.71% White, 0.18% African American, 0.18% Native American, 0.37% Asian, and 0.55% from two or more races. Hispanic or Latino of any race were 0.18% of the population.

There were 200 households, out of which 38.5% had children under the age of 18 living with them, 69.0% were married couples living together, 4.5% had a female householder with no husband present, and 23.5% were non-families. 21.0% of all households were made up of individuals, and 10.0% had someone living alone who was 65 years of age or older. The average household size was 2.72 and the average family size was 3.20.

In the township the population was spread out, with 29.2% under the age of 18, 7.4% from 18 to 24, 29.0% from 25 to 44, 20.4% from 45 to 64, and 14.0% who were 65 years of age or older. The median age was 36 years. For every 100 females, there were 119.4 males. For every 100 females age 18 and over, there were 105.9 males.

The median income for a household in the township was $30,000, and the median income for a family was $34,286. Males had a median income of $28,611 versus $22,083 for females. The per capita income for the township was $12,747. About 9.2% of families and 14.3% of the population were below the poverty line, including 16.7% of those under age 18 and 14.3% of those age 65 or over.
