= Pennsylvania Route 28 =

State highway in Pennsylvania, US

Pennsylvania Route 28

Route information
- Maintained by PennDOT
- Length: 98.264 mi (158.141 km)
- Existed: 1927–present

Major junctions
- South end: Anderson Street in Pittsburgh
- I-279 / US 19 Truck / I-579 in Pittsburgh; PA 8 in Etna; PA 910 near Harmar; US 422 in Kittanning; PA 66 in New Bethlehem; US 322 / PA 36 in Brookville; I-80 near Brookville
- North end: US 219 in Brockway

Location
- Country: United States
- State: Pennsylvania
- Counties: Allegheny, Butler, Armstrong, Clarion, Jefferson

Highway system
- Pennsylvania State Route System; Interstate; US; State; Scenic; Legislative
← PA 27	→ PA 29

Pennsylvania Route 28 (PA 28) is a major state highway, which runs for 98 miles (158 km) from Anderson Street in Pittsburgh to U.S. Route 219 (US 219) in Brockway in Pennsylvania in the United States.

From Pittsburgh to Kittanning, it is a 44.5-mile-long (71.6 km) limited access expressway that is named the Alexander H. Lindsay Memorial Highway, and is also known as the Allegheny Valley Expressway. It is named after Alexander Lindsay, a lawyer who lived in South Buffalo and commuted to work in Pittsburgh; he successfully lobbied for the city to be connected to the proposed Keystone Shortway (I-80).

== Route description ==
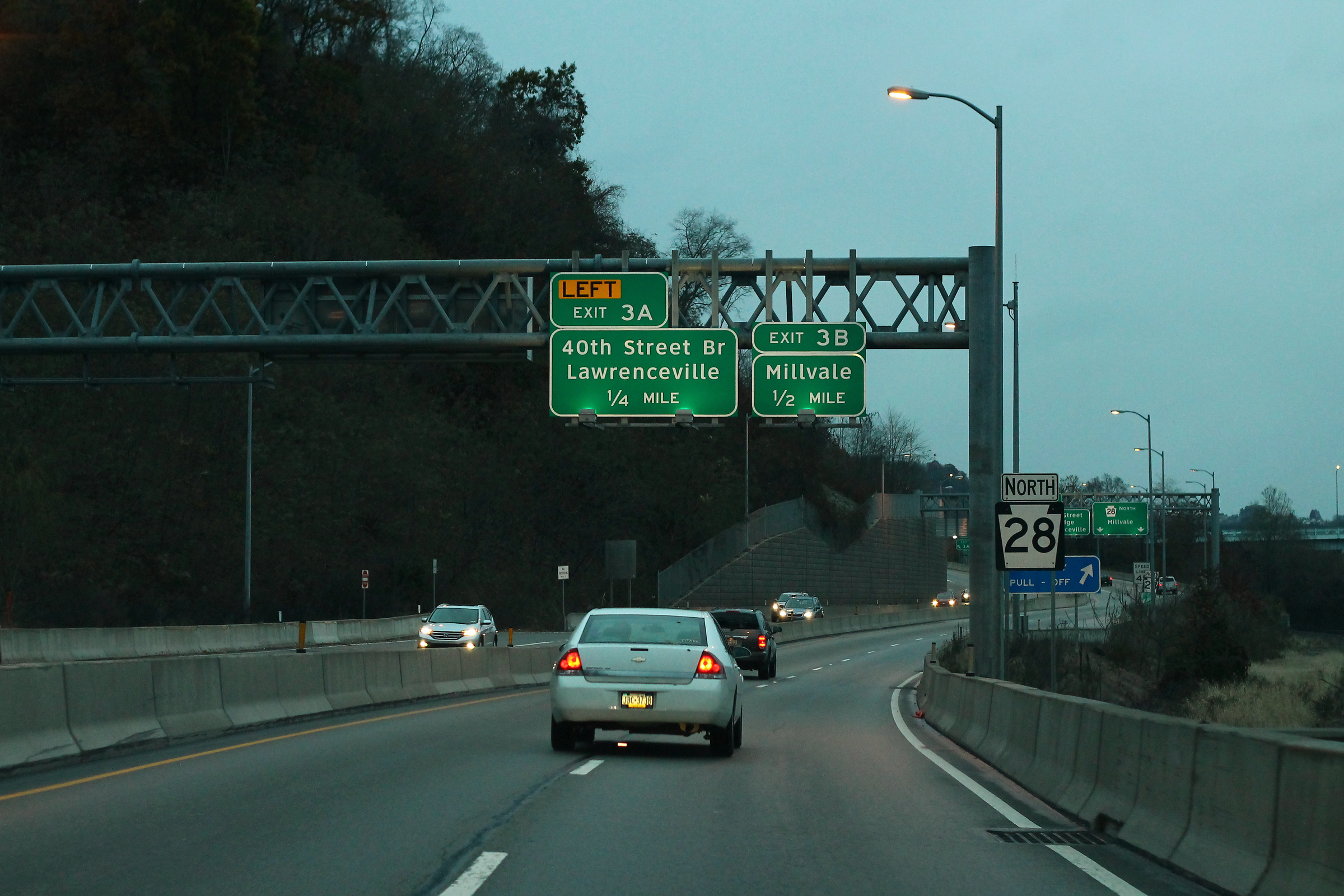
PA 28 northbound approaching the exit for the 40th Street Bridge in Millvale

PA 28 begins adjacent to Downtown Pittsburgh at Anderson Street near the Interstate 279 (I-279)/I-579 interchange and travels north/northeast along the northern bank of the Allegheny River. Until recently the route was a surface street for the first two miles (3.2 km) until the 40th Street Bridge and then an expressway from 40th Street to Kittanning. Upgrades in 2013 made it a limited-access highway throughout its 44.5 miles (71.6 km) in the Pittsburgh metropolitan area from the route's start at I-279 to Rayburn Township, Armstrong County, with Governor Tom Corbett attending the completion ceremony on November 17, 2014.

In Etna, PA 28 interchanges with Pennsylvania Route 8 at exit 5 before departing the Blue Belt, which PA 28 is part of from I-279/I-579 to this point, at exit 6 near Aspinwall. Near Harmar Township, PA 28 meets Pennsylvania Route 910 at exit 11 which provided access to Interstate 76 (the Pennsylvania Turnpike).

From exit 11 to U.S. Route 422 west of Kittanning, PA 28 has eight interchanges, including exits with Pittsburgh Mills Boulevard (exit 12A), Pennsylvania Route 366 (exit 14), and Pennsylvania Route 356 (exit 17), while continuing to parallel the Allegheny to the east. Exit 18 consists of Pennsylvania Route 128 crossing or which used to be old 28 before the expressway. At exit 19, PA 28 merges with the limited-access US 422 and heads east along US 422 as it proceeds south of West Kittanning.

Upon crossing the Allegheny River and entering Kittanning, US 422 and PA 28 interchange with Pennsylvania Route 66. PA 66 then joins the concurrency for two miles (3 km) to an exit with U.S. Route 422 Business southeast of downtown Kittanning. Here, US 422 leaves the freeway and heads east toward Indiana while PA 28 and PA 66 remain concurrent as they progress northward.

The 41-mile-long (66 km) freeway ends with a concurrency with Pennsylvania Route 66. In Rayburn Township, PA 28/PA 66 intersects the western terminus of Pennsylvania Route 85. After PA 85, PA 28/PA 66 head towards the northeast. In South Bethlehem, PA 28/PA 66 become North Street and Broad Street then intersecting the northern terminus of Pennsylvania Route 839.

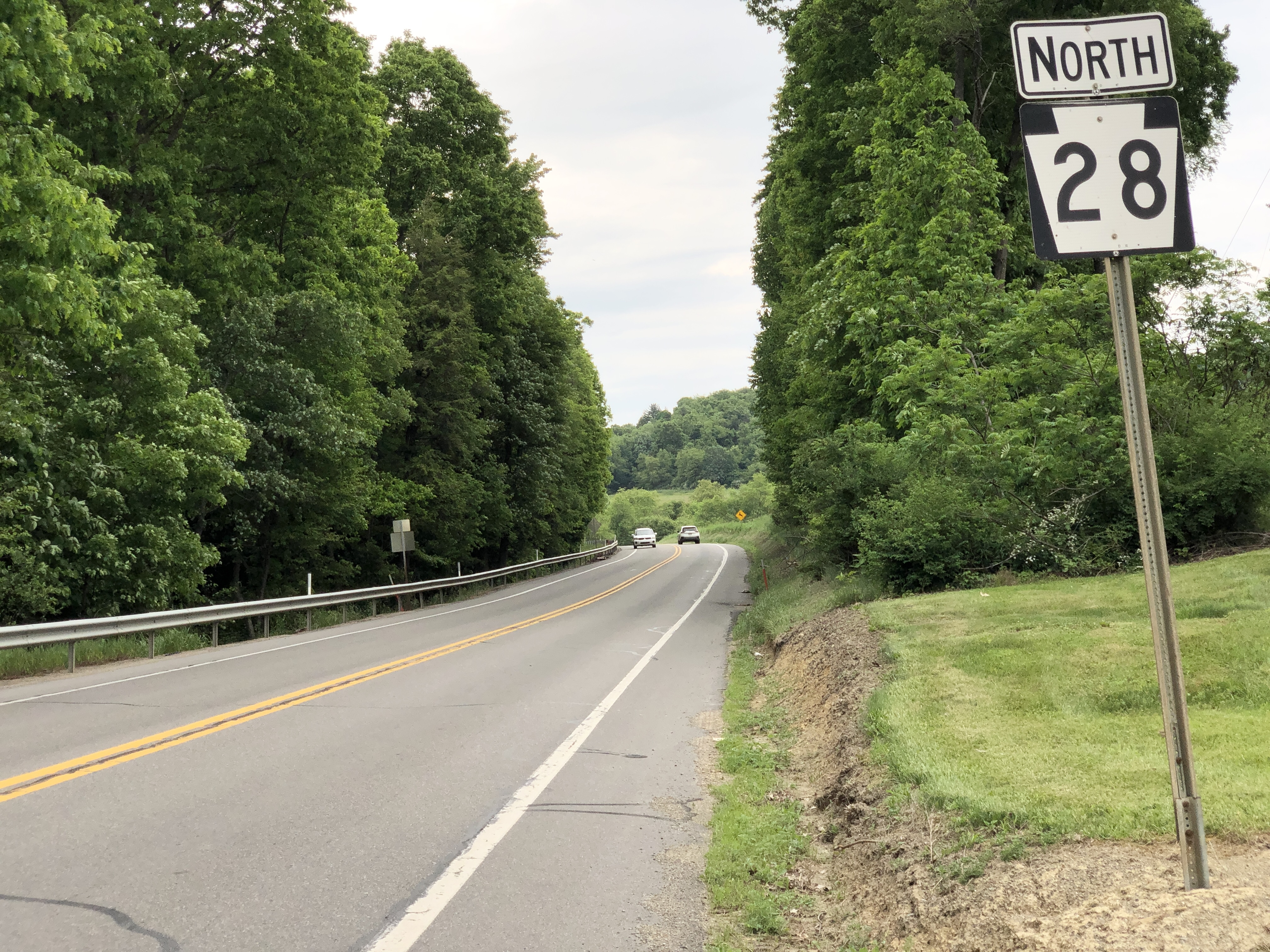
PA 28 northbound past PA 536 in Redbank Township

After crossing Redbank Creek, PA 28/PA 66 enters Clarion County and New Bethlehem. In downtown New Bethlehem, PA 66 splits off from PA 28 and making the PA 28/PA 66 concurrency one of the longest concurrencies in Pennsylvania. After the split, PA 28 heads northeast as Broad Street paralleling Redbank Creek. In Hawthorn, PA 28 is called Brookville Street and meets the western terminus of Pennsylvania Route 536. North of PA 536, PA 28 begins to slide to the north instead of the northeast.

In Summerville, PA 28's course begins to slide towards the northeast again and in Summerville, PA 28 is called Harrison Street. In Clover and Rose townships, PA 28 parallels many railroads tracks that even cross it.

In Brookville, PA 28 has a wrong-way concurrency with U.S. Route 322 and Pennsylvania Route 36. The reason of the wrong-way concurrency is that PA 28 is heading north while PA 36 is heading south on the concurrency with US 322. In downtown Brookville, PA 36 splits off from US 322/PA 28. Then after crossing North Fork Creek, US 322/PA 28 meet the southern terminus of the former Pennsylvania Route 968.

East of here, US 322 splits off from PA 28 at a "T" interchange. East of Brookville in Pine Creek Township, PA 28 intersects Interstate 80 at exit 81 a diamond interchange. North of I-80, PA 28 continues north as a local road without intersecting another route for more than 14 miles (23 km). PA 28 passes through the many wildlife in Pennsylvania through a forest region. In Brockway, PA 28 is called Main Street before terminating (ending) at a "T" intersection with U.S. Route 219.

== History ==
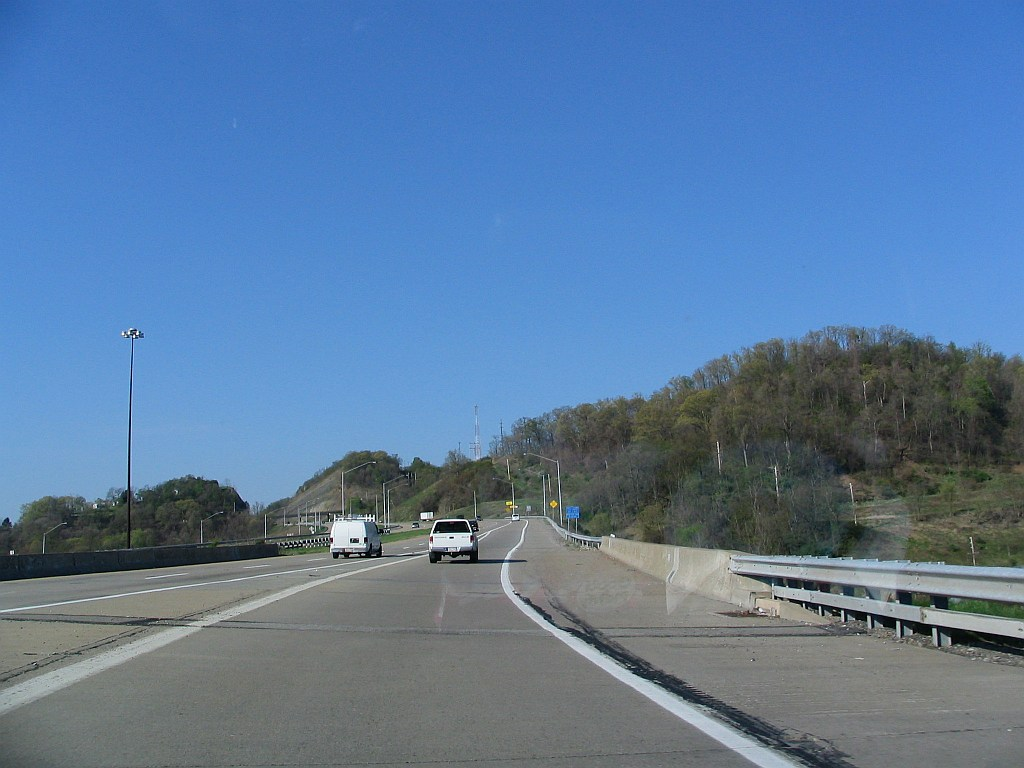
PA 28 southbound from exit 14 (PA 366)

In 1927, PA 28 was created, being signed on existing two lane roads from Pittsburgh to Kittanning. The highway was extended to Brockway in 1928. That same year, the route was under construction from Blawnox to Cheswick, Troy Hill Road to Oakland, and Hazen to Reitz Crossing Road. Those sections were completed in 1929, at which point the section from Avella to Woodrow and from Hickory to Fort Cherry Road began construction. In 1929, the segments from Blawnox to Cheswick, Troy Hill Road to Oakland, and Hazen to Reitz Crossing Road were completed.In 1930, the segment from Blawnox to Cheswick was opened to traffic, officially completing the original road.

In 1931, the roadway was paved from Skyline Road to PA 18.

In 1932, the Kittaning Citizens Bridge was rebuilt with a new substructure.

In 1933, the southern terminus was extended from Avella to PA 844 in Independence.

In 1939, a new trumpet interchange connecting to the replacement Highland Park Bridge opened.

In 1951, the interchange and underpass over the PA turnpike were completed.

In 1948, construction began on a new expressway bypass of the segment of East Ohio Street traveling through Millvale. It was opened to traffic in 1950.

In 1952, the intersection with the Tarentum Bridge was completed.

In 1958, the road between the PA Turnpike Interchange and Etha was either widened to four lanes or given a truck breakdown lane.

In 1959, the interchange with I-80 was opened.

On July 15, 1960, the highway's southern terminus was moved from Independence to PA 8 in Etna. The former section of PA 28 from South Main Street in the West End Valley to the intersection of Noblestown Road and Crafton Boulevard in Crafton Heights was redesignated as PA 60. The remaining 83-mile stretch from Crafton Heights to Independence was renumbered PA 50. This designation change was made to reduce the number of concurrent routes in Pittsburgh. The changes took effect a few months later and signs were changed by the spring of 1961.

In 1965, PA 28 was realigned onto Courthouse Road to bypass the more congested parts of Kittanning.

In 1973, the route was extended to end at the West End Bridge via Western Avenue and the remainder of East Ohio Street.

In 1977, new emergency truck stopping lanes were constructed in certain trouble areas.

In 1957, construction began on another expressway bypass of Sharpsburg. This new alignment was opened to traffic on October 22, 1958. At the same time a reconstruction of the road to expressway standards from Sharpsburg to Etna was completed. In 1958, construction began on another stretch of freeway between PA 8 north to the Highland Park Bridge interchange. This opened to traffic in 1963, replacing the previous segment that ran through Etna. In 1964, the roadway to Blawnox was opened, also part of this project was the reconstruction of the segment from Brackenridge and Butler to expressway standards. That same year, the interchange with I-80 was opened. In 1968, the segment to Fox Run Road was completed. In 1972, the segment from Exit 16 to Armstrong County and from Blawnox to PA 910 and from Exit 15 to US 422 was opened to traffic. Construction on this section began in 1968. In 1973, part of the roadway from Exit 11 to Exit 12 was opened. On October 17, 1980, the expressway from Exit 12 to the north border of Tarentum was opened to traffic, it was also extended onto a new at-grade segment. The final stretch of the Allegheny Valley Expressway between Exit 13 and Exit 15 opened in 1985, PA 28 was subsequently removed from Freeport Road.

In 1986, the intersection connecting the road to the 30th Street Bridge was demolished as part of that structure's replacement.

In 1987, through traffic at both the Highland Park Interchange and Etna Interchange was restricted from two lanes to one lane, with deceleration lanes and emergency shoulders being added in their place. This was done to increase safety, as well better serve the high demand for the exits themselves.

In 1989, a freeway to replace East Ohio Street from ninth Street to the 31st Street Bridge was opened to traffic as part of construction of I-279.

In 1991, a new interchange with PA 65 near the West End Bridge was completed, while the bridge itself was reconstructed and gained lane control systems.

In 1993, PA 28’s northern terminus was relocated from the West End Bridge to the I-279 interchange.

In the late 1980s, plans to reconstruct the roadway in Millvale were made. This came after the section saw 169 accidents from 1982 through 1987, 96 of such were injuries, with 4 causing fatalities. Construction began on September 6, 1988, and involved blasting 600,000 cubic yards of rock from the hillside that parallels the highway to reduce slides, widening the lanes to 12 feet each, adding 10-foot-wide shoulders, adding shoulder pull-off areas such as on the eastern segment, and placing a Jersey barrier in the middle of the four foot median. The Etna interchange received new lights and signage. The $14.4 million project that required four lanes of traffic to squeeze into two temporarily ceased on December 7, 1990, due to rain hampering construction. Glare screen was erected on the Jersey barrier in 1991 to cut down on the effects of headlights from oncoming traffic. Due to the placement in the median instead of the outside due to the narrow right-of-way, the lights came online in 1995. Lighting standards were not installed prior because of financial uncertainty.

On May 20, 1996, an act of the Pennsylvania legislature officially renamed the Allegheny Valley Expressway as the Alexander H. Lindsay Highway.

On March 12, 2001, a $13 million project to reconstruct the roadway between exit 6 and exit 10 began. It concluded on September 20, 2001, half a million dollars under budget.

As early as 1953, there had been proposals for a bypass of Kittanning due to heavy congestion. Construction on this bypass began on March 24, 2000. It was opened to traffic on December 13, 2001.

In July 2002, exit numbers were assigned to intersections and interchanges north of the Kittitang Bypass.

In 2003, after rocks and debris fell from a common rock fall segment of the roadway, it was decided to reduce the roadway from two to one lane in the southbound direction.

In July 2005, an interchange was opened in Harwick to serve the Pittsburgh Mills Boulevard and the Pittsburgh Mills shopping center.

In the spring of 2006, the 2.9 mile stretch of roadway south of exit 17 was rebuilt.

In March 2007, a project to add a southbound truck climbing lane from Harmar and Harwick began. They would also repair the northbound roadway, install chain-link fencing, construct new catch basins, relocate the roadway in some areas, and reinforce concrete. The project was completed in 2008.

On March 31, 2008, construction began on a new ramp to I-279 southbound from PA 28 to relieve congestion that had been prevalent since its opening. The new $7.9 million ramp opened to traffic on September 25, 2008.

A project to rebuild the PA 8 interchange began on August 16, 1999, when the off-ramp from PA 28 southbound from PA 28 northbound was closed for a total of $4.7 million. A new ramp was constructed, it was thicker and excavated in a way to lessen the threat of falling rocks. The project was completed on January 11, 2000. On April 26, 2004, more improvements began at the PA 8 interchange. Before work began, a water line was relocated and a 1,000-foot-long retaining wall built below. After this was completed, the through lanes were demolished and rebuilt from the ground up, and the ramp from PA 8 south was permanently closed and replaced by a new, differently constructed one. The $26,500,000 project finished on March 17, 2005. Further work at the PA 8 interchange began on June 7, 2009. This project involved demolishing the old one lane northbound overpass and replacing it with a two-lane overpass. It opened to one lane traffic on October 27, 2009 and opened fully a month later on November 25 drawing to a close the $22.5 million project. Another $27.2 batch of construction began at the PA 8 interchange on March 15, 2010. It consisted of roadway reconstruction, bridge replacement, bridge rehabilitation, wall construction, approach roadway widening, drainage, guide rail, concrete barrier, curb, landscaping, highway lighting, signing and pavement markings, signals, and improvements between Exit 4 and Exit 5. The majority of work was completed on December 3, 2010 when two-lane northbound traffic resumed, but minor work continued.

In November 2009, a project began to rebuild the at-grade intersections with the 31st Street Bridge and 40th Street Bridge into grade separated interchanges. The $24.8 million project included demolishing and relocating the Norfolk Southern rail lines, upgrading drainage, replacing the wired traffic signals with overhead gantry ones, utility reconstruction, and wall and bridge replacement along PA 28 from Chestnut Street to the 40th Street Bridge. Bridge pier reconstruction at the 31st Street Bridge, part of the project, involved closing the span on July 6, 2010 which gave commuters a reprieve from at least one signal until August 3, when the intersection was reopened with temporary signals. In September 2011, the southbound lanes of PA 28 were shifted to bypass the intersection of the 40th Street Bridge. The northbound lanes remained under the bridge. The American Recovery and Reinvestment Act-funded work was completed by June 2012. In August 2012, an excavation lowered the roadbed of PA 28 at the 31st Street Bridge, which had been partially demolished to allow this. All lanes were clear of lane closures and construction by November, 2014 when Governor Tom Corbett attended the official groundbreaking ceremony to celebrate all 44.5 miles being expressway-grade. The widening included a small park with a promenade and a retaining wall which features several murals on the city's history, including that of the Saint Nicholas Croatian Catholic Church on the aforementioned structure's site.

In 2015, a bike lane was created between the 31st Street Bridge and Millvaile.

In December 2023, the segment of roadway in Fox Chapel was reconstructed.

On December 12, 2017, PennDOT announced a plan to widen the roadway to four lanes at the Highland Park Bridge interchange, though retaining the dedicated exit and entrance lanes for the exit approaches themselves. Work started in 2021. The project was completed in March 2024.

In April 2024, the Brockway intersection was altered.

In Summer 2024, wrong way driving sensors were installed to increase awareness of wrong way driving among perpetrators.

In November 2023, a new roadway was partially completed in Goheenville. After the opening of the new roadway, the old roadway was then closed for demolition, with the rest of its replacement completed by late 2025.

The only things keeping the freeway portion of PA-28 from having a interstate designation are the 45-mph speed limits near the Millvale and Etna Exits, as well as the section of the southbound one-lane expressway between Exit 9 (Blawnox Exit), and Exit 8 (Waterworks Exit). If these are ever to be upgraded to Interstate Highway standards, PA 28 will be up to Interstate Highway standards from its southern terminus all the way to Kittanning, and could potentially receive an Interstate designation in the future.

In its 2015 transportation plan, PennDOT announced it was potentially interested in rebuilding or realigning the portion of road from US 422 to I-80 into a tolled expressway. Studies for this project began in May 2019.

== Major intersections ==
County	Location	mi	km	Exit	Destinations	Notes
Allegheny	Pittsburgh	0.000	0.000		Anderson Street	Southern terminus
Allegheny	Pittsburgh	0.073– 0.111	0.117– 0.179		River Avenue	Northbound exit and entrance
Allegheny	Pittsburgh	0.375	0.604		Chestnut Street	Northbound exit only
Allegheny	Pittsburgh	0.414– 0.746	0.666– 1.201	1B	To I-279 north (US 19 Truck north) / East Ohio Street – PNC Park, Acrisure Stadium, Allegheny Center	No southbound entrance; signed as exit 1B southbound only
Allegheny	Pittsburgh	0.458	0.737	1A	I-279 south (US 19 Truck south) / I-579 south (Veterans Bridge) to I-376 (US 22 / US 30 / Fort Pitt Bridge) – Monroeville, Airport	Southbound exit and northbound entrance
Allegheny	Pittsburgh	1.497– 1.750	2.409– 2.816	2	31st Street Bridge – Strip District	
Allegheny	Millvale	2.319– 2.456	3.732– 3.953	3A	40th Street Bridge – Lawrenceville	Inverted SPUI/continuous green T hybrid interchange; no northbound entrance (northbound traffic directed to 3B entrance)
Allegheny	Millvale	2.647– 2.857	4.260– 4.598	3B	Blue Belt – Millvale	No southbound entrance (southbound traffic directed to 3A entrance), southern terminus of Blue Belt concurrency
Allegheny	Etna	3.968	6.386	4	Etna	Northbound exit and southbound entrance
Allegheny	Etna	4.522– 4.539	7.277– 7.305	5A	PA 8 south (R.D. Fleming Bridge) – Sharpsburg	Northbound exit and southbound entrance
Allegheny	Etna	4.567– 4.813	7.350– 7.746	5B	PA 8 north – Butler, Etna	Signed as exit 5 southbound
Allegheny	Etna	6.218– 6.418	10.007– 10.329	6	To PA 8 south / Highland Park Bridge / Blue Belt / Green Belt – Aspinwall	Northern terminus of Blue Belt concurrency, southern terminus of Green Belt concurrency
Allegheny	Aspinwall	6.846– 7.123	11.018– 11.463	7	Delafield Avenue	No southbound exit
Allegheny	Aspinwall	7.618– 7.771	12.260– 12.506	8	Freeport Road, Fox Chapel Road ( Green Belt), Waterworks Drive	Northern terminus of Green Belt concurrency
Allegheny	Blawnox	8.003– 8.029	12.880– 12.921	9	Blawnox	Northbound exit and southbound entrance
Allegheny	Blawnox	8.922– 9.250	14.359– 14.886	10	R.I.D.C. Drive	
Allegheny	Harmar Township	12.038– 12.493	19.373– 20.106	11	PA 910 west / Yellow Belt to I-76 / Penna Turnpike – Harmarville, Harmar	Eastern terminus of PA 910
Allegheny	Cheswick	13.715– 14.191	22.072– 22.838	12	Cheswick, Springdale	
Allegheny	Cheswick	14.990– 15.462	24.124– 24.884	12A	Pittsburgh Mills Boulevard	
Allegheny	Creighton	16.373– 17.236	26.350– 27.739	13	Orange Belt – Russellton, Creighton	Northbound exit and southbound entrance
Allegheny	Tarentum	18.125– 19.382	29.169– 31.192	14	PA 366 east / Red Belt – Tarentum, Brackenridge, New Kensington, Arnold, Lower Burrell, Fawn Township	Western terminus of PA 366
Allegheny	Harrison Township	20.805– 21.226	33.482– 34.160	15	Natrona Heights, Natrona, Brackenridge	Brackenridge appears on southbound signs only.
Allegheny	Harrison Township	23.717– 24.147	38.169– 38.861	16	Freeport, Millerstown	Freeport appears on northbound signs only.
Butler	Buffalo Township	25.337– 25.816	40.776– 41.547	17	PA 356 – Freeport, Butler	
Armstrong	North Buffalo Township	31.346– 31.842	50.446– 51.245	18	PA 128 – Slate Lick, Northpointe	
Armstrong	East Franklin Township	37.480– 38.000	60.318– 61.155	19	US 422 west – Butler, West Kittanning	Southern terminus of US 422 concurrency
Armstrong	Manor Township	39.915– 40.001	64.237– 64.375	A	PA 66 south – Ford City	Southern terminus of PA 66 (southbound) concurrency; exits to PA 66 southbound only
Armstrong	Manor Township	40.256– 40.590	64.786– 65.323	B	To US 422 Bus. – Kittanning	Southern terminus of PA 66 (northbound) concurrency; no access to PA 66 southbound
Armstrong	Manor Township	41.511– 42.302	66.805– 68.078		US 422 east / US 422 Bus. west – Indiana, Kittanning	Northern terminus of US 422 concurrency; eastern terminus of US 422 Bus.
Armstrong	Manor Township	42.806	68.890	Northern terminus of freeway		
Armstrong	Rayburn Township	42.806	68.890		PA 85 east – Rural Valley, Plumville	Western terminus of PA 85
Armstrong	South Bethlehem	59.871	96.353		PA 839 south – Mahoning Dam	Northern terminus of PA 839
Clarion	New Bethlehem	60.176	96.844		PA 66 north – Clarion	Northern terminus of PA 66 concurrency
Clarion	Redbank Township	65.661	105.671		PA 536 east (Mayport Road) / Wallwork Road – Mayport	Western terminus of PA 536
Jefferson	Clover Township	73.103	117.648		PA 949 north (Summerville-Corsica Road) / Water Street – Corsica	Southern terminus of PA 949
Jefferson	Brookville	79.500	127.943		US 322 west (28th Division Highway) / PA 36 north / PA 28 Truck north (Allegheny Boulevard) to I-80 – Leeper, Clarion	Southern terminus of US 322/PA 36 concurrency; southern terminus of PA 28 Truck
Jefferson	Brookville	80.282	129.201		PA 36 south (White Street) – Punxsutawney	Northern terminus of PA 36 concurrency
Jefferson	Pine Creek Township	81.421	131.034		US 322 east – Reynoldsville	Northern terminus of US 322 concurrency
Jefferson	Pine Creek Township	82.580– 82.696	132.900– 133.086		I-80 / PA 28 Truck south – Clarion, DuBois	Exit 81 (I-80); northern terminus of PA 28 Truck
Jefferson	Brockway	98.264	158.141		US 219 (Main Street / Cherry Street) – Ridgway, DuBois	Northern terminus
1.000 mi = 1.609 km; 1.000 km = 0.621 mi: Concurrency terminus; Incomplete access

== PA 28 Truck ==
Pennsylvania Route 28 Truck
- Location: Brookville, Pennsylvania
- Length: 3.3 mi (5.3 km)
- Existed: 1963–present

Pennsylvania Route 28 Truck is a 3-mile-long (4.8 km) truck route in Brookville, Jefferson County, Pennsylvania. As Route 28 travels through the Brookville city center, it becomes a narrow main street and features a relatively sharp turn just west of the bridge over North Fork Creek. As a result, after the completion of Interstate 80, Route 28's truck traffic was shifted onto this freeway bypass from Exit 78 at Pennsylvania Route 36 (which Truck 28 is cosigned for its first 1/2 mile of existence) to Exit 81, where Route 28 meets the highway.
