= Clover Township, Jefferson County, Pennsylvania =

Township in Pennsylvania, US

Coordinates: 41°07′54″N 79°10′32″W

Clover Township, Pennsylvania
- Township
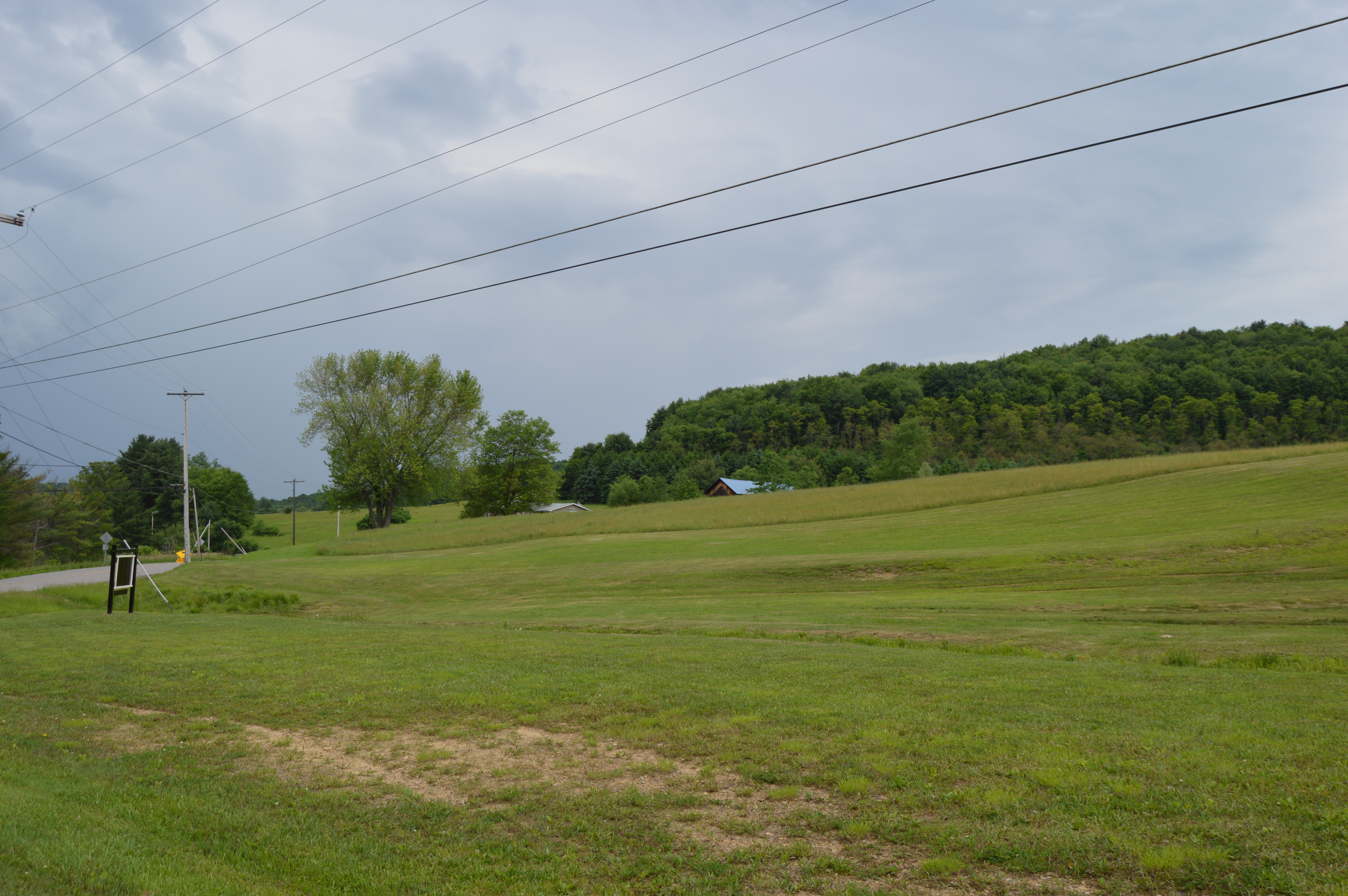
- Countryside between Corsica and Summerville

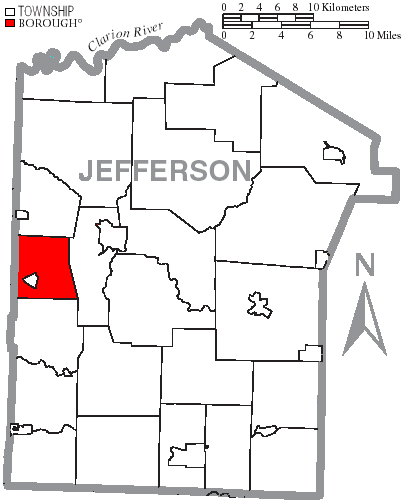
- Map of Jefferson County, Pennsylvania Highlighting Clover Township

- Map of Jefferson County, Pennsylvania
- Country: United States
- State: Pennsylvania
- County: Jefferson
- Settled: 1812
- Incorporated: May 11, 1841

Government
  - Type: Township of the Second Class, having a three member board of Supervisors

Area
  - Total: 16.12 sq mi (41.75 km^{2})
  - Land: 15.94 sq mi (41.29 km^{2})
  - Water: 0.18 sq mi (0.46 km^{2})

Population (2010)
  - Total: 429
  - Estimate (2023): 422
  - Density: 26.9/sq mi (10.4/km^{2})
- Time zone: UTC-5 (Eastern (EST))
  - Summer (DST): UTC-4 (EDT)
- Area code: 814
- FIPS code: 42-065-14408

Clover Township is a township in Jefferson County, Pennsylvania, United States. The population was 429 at the 2020 census, down from 448 at the 2010 census. It was named for Levi G. Clover, Jefferson County prothonotary, in 1841.

== Geography ==
Clover Township is in western Jefferson County and is bordered on its west side by Clarion County. According to the United States Census Bureau, the township has a total area of 16.1 square miles (41.8 km^{2}), of which 15.9 square miles (41.3 km^{2}) are land and 0.2 square miles (0.5 km^{2}), or 1.11%, are water. Redbank Creek, a tributary of the Allegheny River, crosses the township from east to southwest.

The township entirely surrounds the borough of Summerville, located on Redbank Creek. There are two unincorporated villages, Baxter and Content. Pennsylvania Route 28 crosses the township, roughly following Redbank Creek and leading northeast to Brookville, the Jefferson county seat, and southwest to Hawthorn.

== Demographics ==
Historical population
Census	Pop.	Note	%±
1850	737		—
1860	910		23.5%
1870	868		−4.6%
1880	1,054		21.4%
1890	642		−39.1%
1900	604		−5.9%
1910	750		24.2%
1920	789		5.2%
1930	550		−30.3%
1940	540		−1.8%
1950	536		−0.7%
1960	480		−10.4%
1970	448		−6.7%
1980	500		11.6%
1990	523		4.6%
2000	474		−9.4%
2010	429		−9.5%
2023 (est.)	422
U.S. Decennial Census

As of the census of 2010, there were 448 people, 190 households, and 139 families residing in the township. The population density was 29.3 inhabitants per square mile (11.3/km^{2}). There were 225 housing units at an average density of 13.4/sq.mi (5.2/km^{2}). The racial makeup of the township was 99.3% White, 0.7% from other races Hispanic or Latino of any race were 0.7% of the population.

There were 190 households, out of which 22.6% had children under the age of 18 living with them, 62.1% were married couples living together, 6.8% had a female householder with no husband present, and 26.8% were non-families. 25.8% of all households were made up of individuals, and 10% had someone living alone who was 65 years of age or older. The average household size was 2.36 and the average family size was 2.79.

In the township the population was spread out, with 10.1% under the age of 18, 6.2% from 18 to 24, 10.2% from 25 to 44, 18.6% from 45 to 64, and 8.3% who are 65 years of age or older. The median age was 46.9 years. There were 225 males and 223 females.

The median income for a household in the township was $46,786, and the median income for a family was $59,057. The per capita income for the township was $23,739. About 5.6% of families and 7.5% of the population were below the poverty line, including 12.5% of those under age 18 and 5.9% of those age 65 or over.
