= Brady Township, Pennsylvania =

Brady Township is the name of some places in the U.S. state of Pennsylvania:

- Brady Township, Butler County, Pennsylvania
- Brady Township, Clarion County, Pennsylvania
- Brady Township, Clearfield County, Pennsylvania
- Brady Township, Huntingdon County, Pennsylvania
- Brady Township, Lycoming County, Pennsylvania

== See also ==
- Bradys Bend Township, Armstrong County, Pennsylvania
