= Redbank Township, Pennsylvania =

Redbank Township can refer to the following U.S. locations:

- Redbank Township, Armstrong County, Pennsylvania
- Redbank Township, Clarion County, Pennsylvania
