= Knox Dale, Pennsylvania =

- Unincorporated community
- Location within Pennsylvania Location within the United States
- Coordinates: 41°05′10″N 79°01′35″W
- Country: United States
- State: Pennsylvania
- County: Jefferson
- Township: Knox
- Elevation: 1,676 ft (511 m)
- Time zone: UTC-5 (Eastern (EST))
  - Summer (DST): UTC-4 (EDT)
- ZIP code: 15847
- Area code: 814
- GNIS feature ID: 1178622

Knox Dale is an unincorporated community in Jefferson County, Pennsylvania, United States. The community is 6 miles (9.7 km) south-southeast of Brookville. Knox Dale has a post office with ZIP code 15847.

== History ==
Knox Dale was originally called Shadagee, and under the latter name was platted in 1851. A post office has been in operation under the name Knox Dale since 1863.
