= Knox Township, Jefferson County, Pennsylvania =

Township in Pennsylvania, US

Coordinates: 41°05′00″N 78°58′59″W

- Township
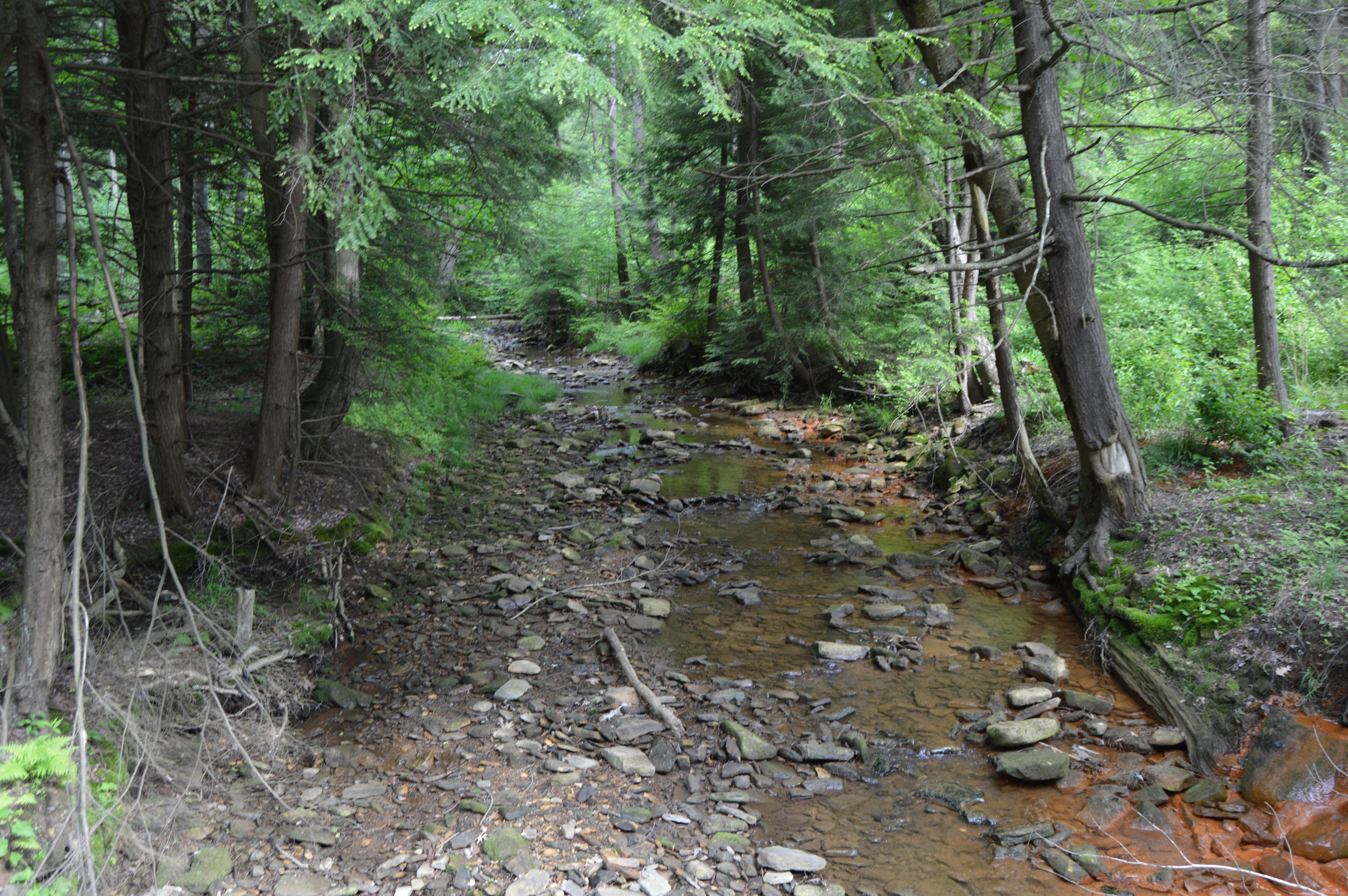
- Small creek south of Brookville

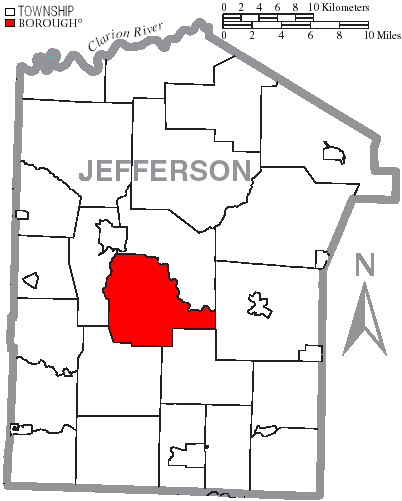
- Map of Jefferson County, Pennsylvania Highlighting Knox Township

- Map of Jefferson County, Pennsylvania
- Country: United States
- State: Pennsylvania
- County: Jefferson
- Settled: 1817
- Incorporated: 1853

Area
  - Total: 31.56 sq mi (81.73 km^{2})
  - Land: 31.43 sq mi (81.40 km^{2})
  - Water: 0.13 sq mi (0.33 km^{2})

Population (2020)
  - Total: 1,007 ▼
  - Estimate (2023): 989
  - Density: 32.04/sq mi (12.37/km^{2})
- Time zone: UTC-5 (Eastern (EST))
  - Summer (DST): UTC-4 (EDT)
- FIPS code: 42-065-40304

Knox Township is a township in Jefferson County, Pennsylvania, in the United States. As of the 2020 census, the township population was 1,007. It was named for John C. Knox, then President Judge of the judicial district.

== Geography ==
Knox Township is in central Jefferson County, southeast of Brookville, the county seat. According to the United States Census Bureau, the township has a total area of 31.5 square miles (81.7 km^{2}), of which 31.4 square miles (81.4 km^{2}) are land and 0.1 square miles (0.3 km^{2}), or 0.41%, are water. The northeastern border of the township is Sandy Lick Creek, a northwestward-flowing tributary of Redbank Creek, while much of the western border is Fivemile Run, which flows north to Sandy Lick Creek. The entire township is part of the Allegheny River watershed.

The township contains the unincorporated communities of Knox Dale, Ramsaytown, Barnes, Norman, and Green Valley.

== Demographics ==
Historical population
Census	Pop.	Note	%±
1860	637		—
1870	863		35.5%
1880	1,011		17.1%
1890	1,360		34.5%
1900	1,255		−7.7%
1910	2,067		64.7%
1920	2,426		17.4%
1930	1,480		−39.0%
1940	1,412		−4.6%
1950	1,176		−16.7%
1960	996		−15.3%
1970	843		−15.4%
1980	1,072		27.2%
1990	1,014		−5.4%
2000	1,056		4.1%
2010	1,042		−1.3%
2020	1,007		−3.4%
2023 (est.)	989		−1.8%
U.S. Decennial Census

As of the census of 2000, there were 1,056 people, 415 households, and 300 families residing in the township. The population density was 33.8 inhabitants per square mile (13.1/km^{2}). There were 501 housing units at an average density of 16.0/sq mi (6.2/km^{2}). The racial makeup of the township was 99.62% White, 0.09% African American, 0.09% Asian, and 0.19% from two or more races. Hispanic or Latino of any race were 0.09% of the population.

There were 415 households, out of which 29.2% had children under the age of 18 living with them, 63.9% were married couples living together, 4.8% had a female householder with no husband present, and 27.5% were non-families. 22.7% of all households were made up of individuals, and 12.5% had someone living alone who was 65 years of age or older. The average household size was 2.54 and the average family size was 2.99.

In the township the population was spread out, with 23.8% under the age of 18, 7.8% from 18 to 24, 27.9% from 25 to 44, 25.0% from 45 to 64, and 15.5% who were 65 years of age or older. The median age was 39 years. For every 100 females there were 97.4 males. For every 100 females age 18 and over, there were 97.3 males.

The median income for a household in the township was $31,484, and the median income for a family was $36,250. Males had a median income of $29,922 versus $17,031 for females. The per capita income for the township was $15,040. About 5.9% of families and 7.9% of the population were below the poverty line, including 9.1% of those under age 18 and 7.1% of those age 65 or over.
