= Porter Township, Clarion County, Pennsylvania =

Township in Pennsylvania, US

Coordinates: 40°59′50″N 79°22′19″W

- Township
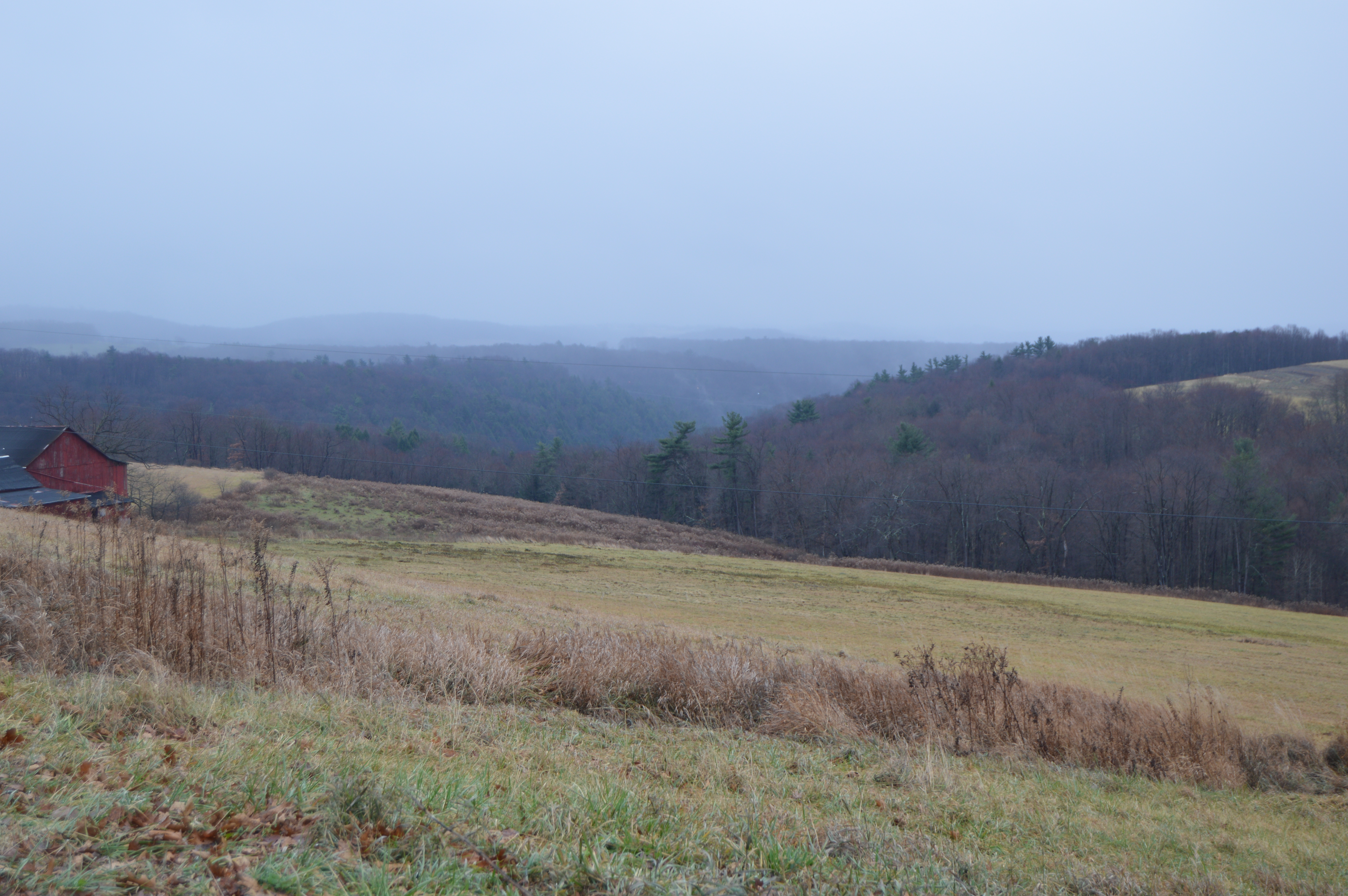
- Countryside near Smithland

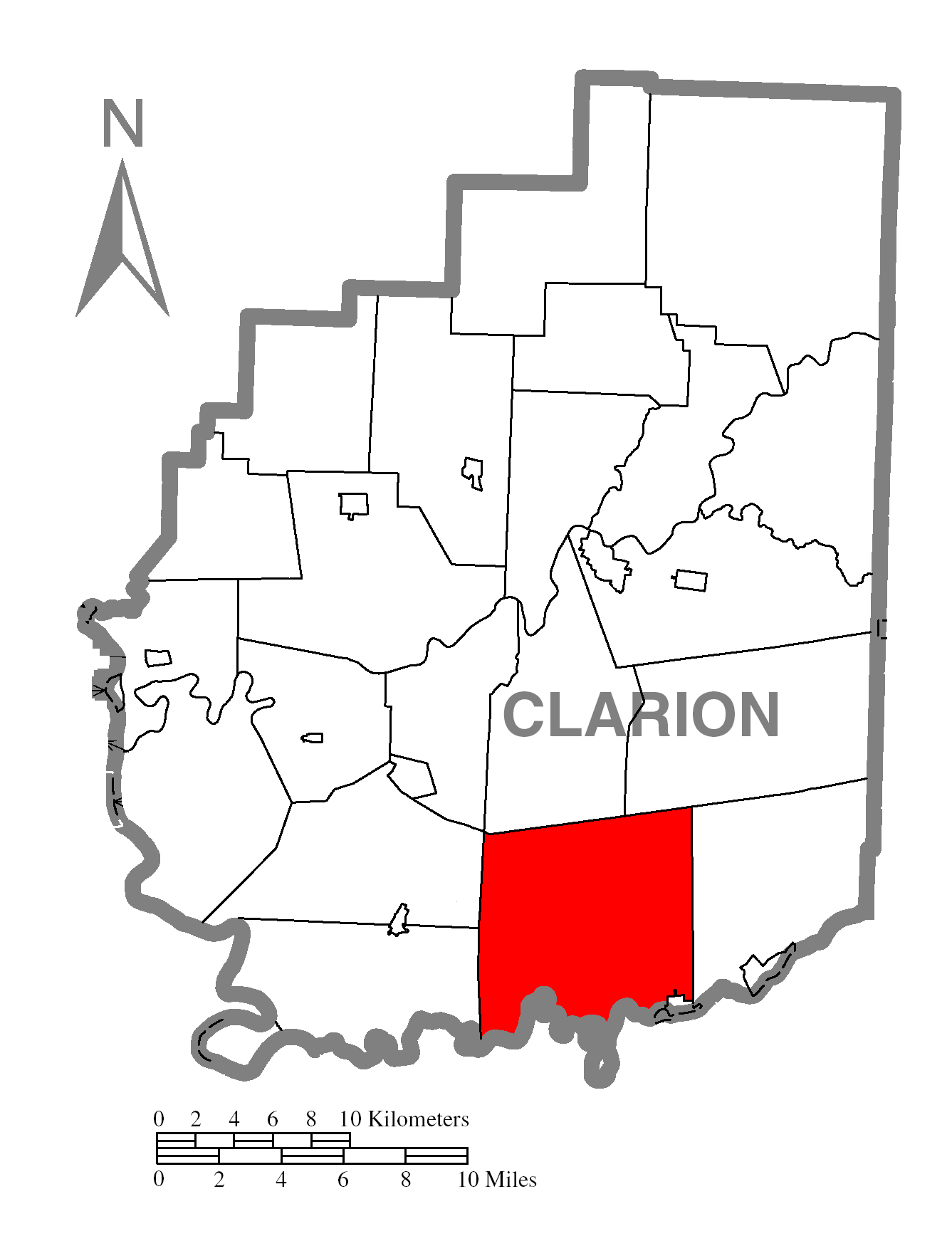
- Map of Clarion County, Pennsylvania highlighting Porter Township

- Map of Clarion County, Pennsylvania
- Country: United States
- State: Pennsylvania
- County: Clarion
- Settled: 1800
- Incorporated: 1839

Area
  - Total: 44.48 sq mi (115.20 km^{2})
  - Land: 43.88 sq mi (113.65 km^{2})
  - Water: 0.60 sq mi (1.55 km^{2})

Population (2020)
  - Total: 1,287
  - Estimate (2022): 1,269
  - Density: 29.0/sq mi (11.18/km^{2})
- Time zone: UTC-5 (Eastern (EST))
  - Summer (DST): UTC-4 (EDT)
- FIPS code: 42-031-62144

Porter Township is a township in Clarion County, Pennsylvania, United States. The population was 1,287 at the 2020 census, a decrease from the figure of 1,348 tabulated in 2010.

== Geography ==
The township is in southern Clarion County, bordered to the south by Redbank Creek, which forms the Armstrong County line. The borough of New Bethlehem touches the southeastern corner of the township. According to the United States Census Bureau, Porter Township has a total area of 44.5 square miles (115.2 km^{2}), of which 43.9 square miles (113.7 km^{2}) is land and 0.58 square miles (1.5 km^{2}), or 1.34%, is water.

== Demographics ==
Historical population
Census	Pop.	Note	%±
2010	1,348		—
2020	1,287		−4.5%
2022 (est.)	1,269		−1.4%
U.S. Decennial Census

As of the census of 2000, there were 1,466 people, 565 households, and 423 families residing in the township. The population density was 33.0 inhabitants per square mile (12.7/km^{2}). There were 603 housing units at an average density of 13.6/sq mi (5.2/km^{2}). The racial makeup of the township was 99.11% White, 0.20% Native American, 0.20% Asian, 0.07% from other races, and 0.41% from two or more races. Hispanic or Latino of any race were 0.27% of the population.

There were 565 households, out of which 31.3% had children under the age of 18 living with them, 66.4% were married couples living together, 6.2% had a female householder with no husband present, and 25.1% were non-families. 21.6% of all households were made up of individuals, and 9.4% had someone living alone who was 65 years of age or older. The average household size was 2.59 and the average family size was 3.02.

In the township the population was spread out, with 24.5% under the age of 18, 8.5% from 18 to 24, 27.8% from 25 to 44, 24.6% from 45 to 64, and 14.6% who were 65 years of age or older. The median age was 38 years. For every 100 females there were 96.3 males. For every 100 females age 18 and over, there were 100.9 males.

The median income for a household in the township was $31,761, and the median income for a family was $36,576. Males had a median income of $30,057 versus $21,583 for females. The per capita income for the township was $14,647. About 8.0% of families and 10.6% of the population were below the poverty line, including 12.6% of those under age 18 and 6.4% of those age 65 or over.
