= Brady Township, Clarion County, Pennsylvania =

Township in Pennsylvania, US

- Township
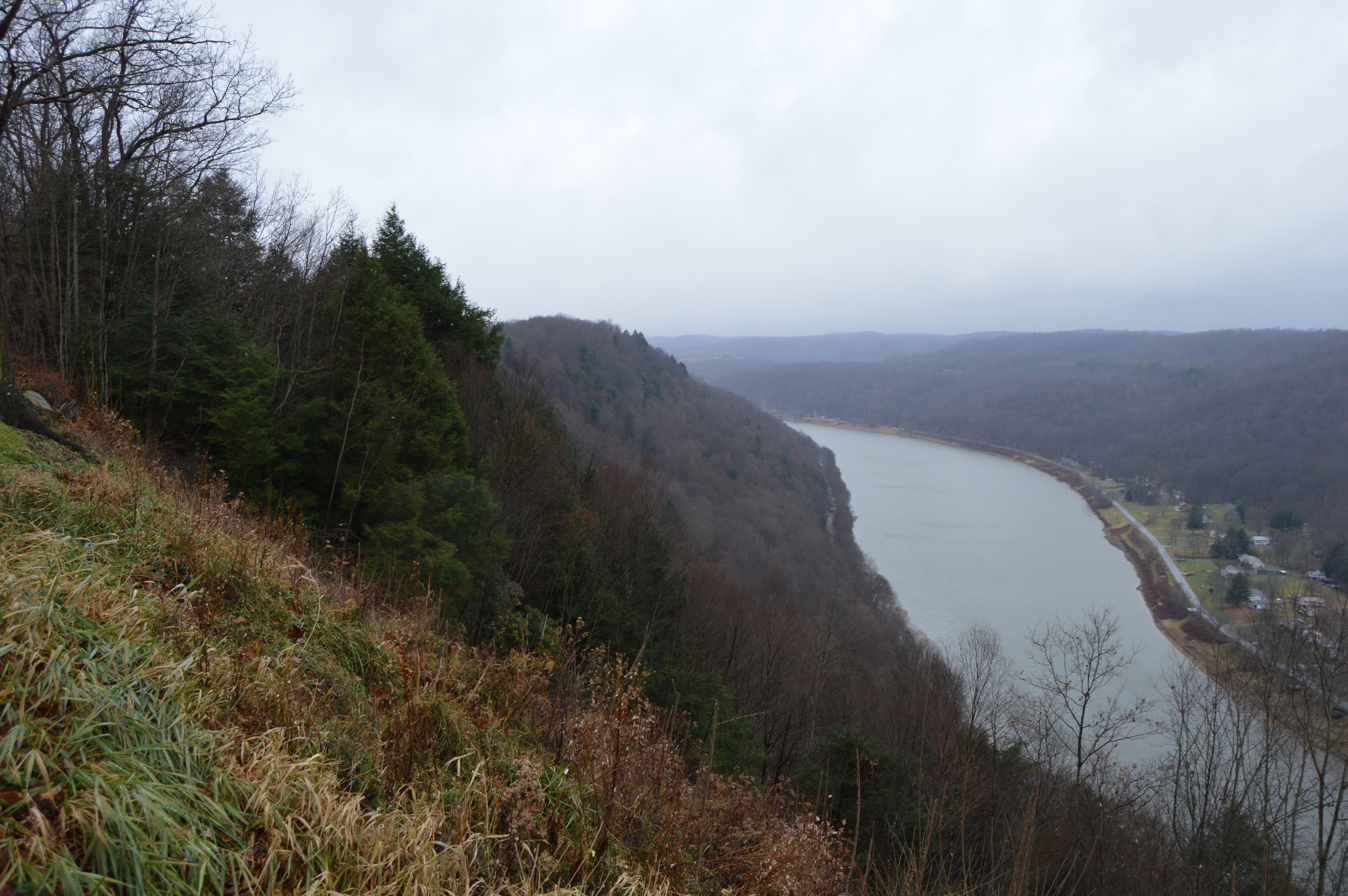
- Hillside over the Allegheny River

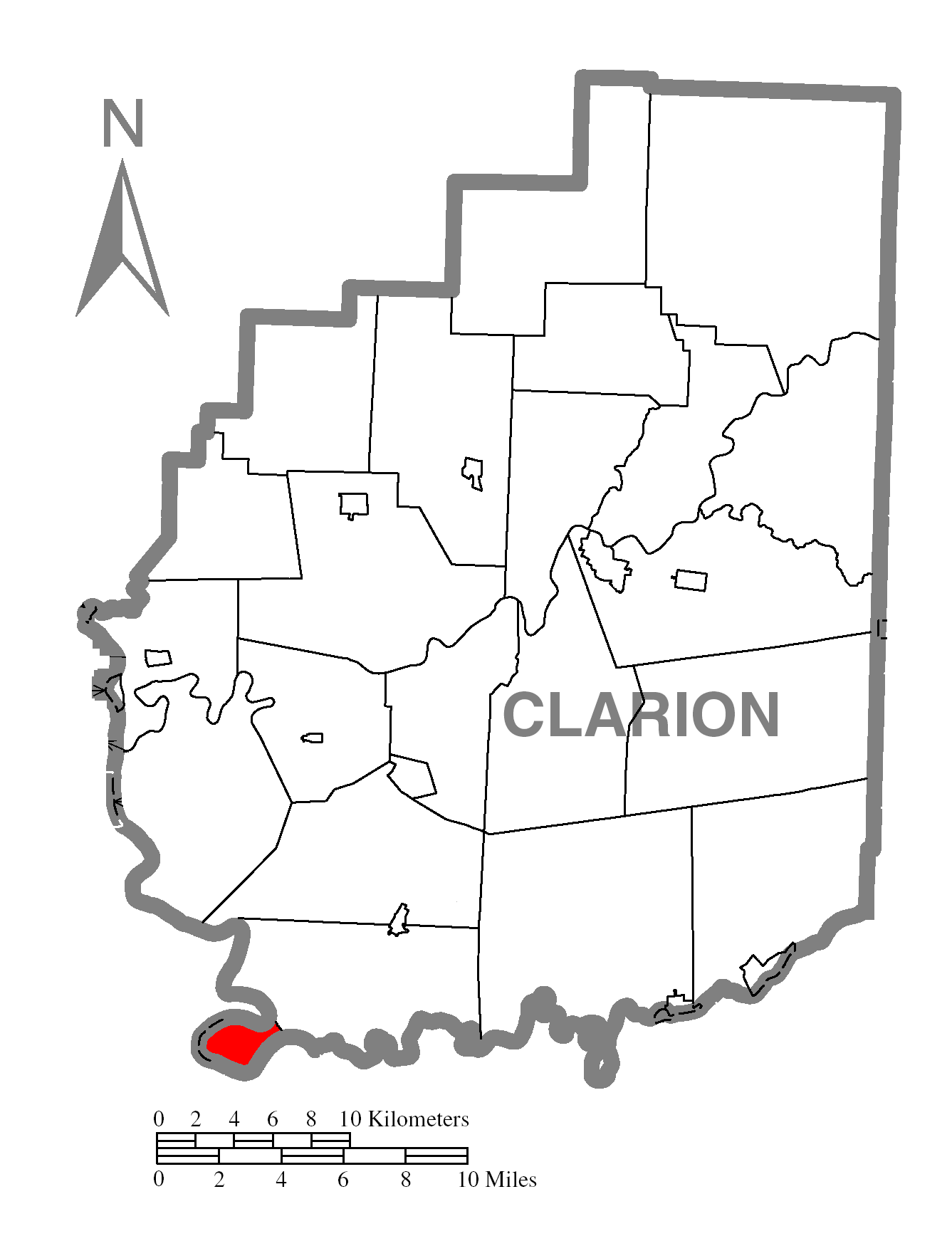
- Map of Clarion County, Pennsylvania highlighting Brady Township

- Map of Clarion County, Pennsylvania
- Coordinates: 40°58′58″N 79°35′30″W
- Country: United States
- State: Pennsylvania
- County: Clarion
- Settled: 1830
- Incorporated: 1866

Area
  - Total: 2.25 sq mi (5.83 km^{2})
  - Land: 1.65 sq mi (4.28 km^{2})
  - Water: 0.59 sq mi (1.54 km^{2})

Population (2020)
  - Total: 75 ▲
  - Estimate (2023): 73
  - Density: 45/sq mi (18/km^{2})
- Time zone: UTC-5 (Eastern (EST))
  - Summer (DST): UTC-4 (EDT)
- FIPS code: 42-031-08112

Brady Township is a township in Clarion County, Pennsylvania, United States. The population was 75 at the 2020 census, an increase from the figure of 55 tabulated in 2010.

== Geography ==
The township is in the southwestern corner of Clarion County and occupies the neck of a large bend in the Allegheny River. The township is bordered on the north by the river, on the west by the borough of East Brady, which occupies most of the bend, on the south and southeast by the river, and on the northeast by Madison Township. Armstrong County lies across the river to the north, west, and south.

According to the United States Census Bureau, Brady Township has a total area of 2.2 square miles (5.8 km^{2}), of which 1.7 square miles (4.3 km^{2}) is land and 0.58 square miles (1.5 km^{2}), or 26.51%, is water.

== Demographics ==
Historical population
Census	Pop.	Note	%±
2010	55		—
2020	75		36.4%
2023 (est.)	73		−2.7%
U.S. Decennial Census

As of the census of 2000, there were 62 people, 24 households, and 16 families residing in the township. The population density was 37.4 people per square mile (14.4 people/km^{2}). There were 29 housing units at an average density of 17.5 per square mile (6.8/km^{2}). The racial makeup of the township was 100.00% White.

There were 24 households, out of which 37.5% had children under the age of 18 living with them, 66.7% were married couples living together, 4.2% had a female householder with no husband present, and 29.2% were non-families. 20.8% of all households were made up of individuals, and 8.3% had someone living alone who was 65 years of age or older. The average household size was 2.58 and the average family size was 3.06.

In the township the population was spread out, with 25.8% under the age of 18, 4.8% from 18 to 24, 29.0% from 25 to 44, 27.4% from 45 to 64, and 12.9% who were 65 years of age or older. The median age was 34 years. For every 100 females there were 93.8 males. For every 100 females age 18 and over, there were 109.1 males.

The median income for a household in the township was $26,875, and the median income for a family was $32,750. Males had a median income of $24,375 versus $31,250 for females. The per capita income for the township was $9,624. There were no families and 3.0% of the population living below the poverty line, including no under eighteens and none of those over 64.

== Education ==
Brady Township is part of the Karns City Area School District, with K-6 students attending Sugarcreek Elementary School.
