= Hawthorn, Pennsylvania =

Borough in Pennsylvania, US

- Borough
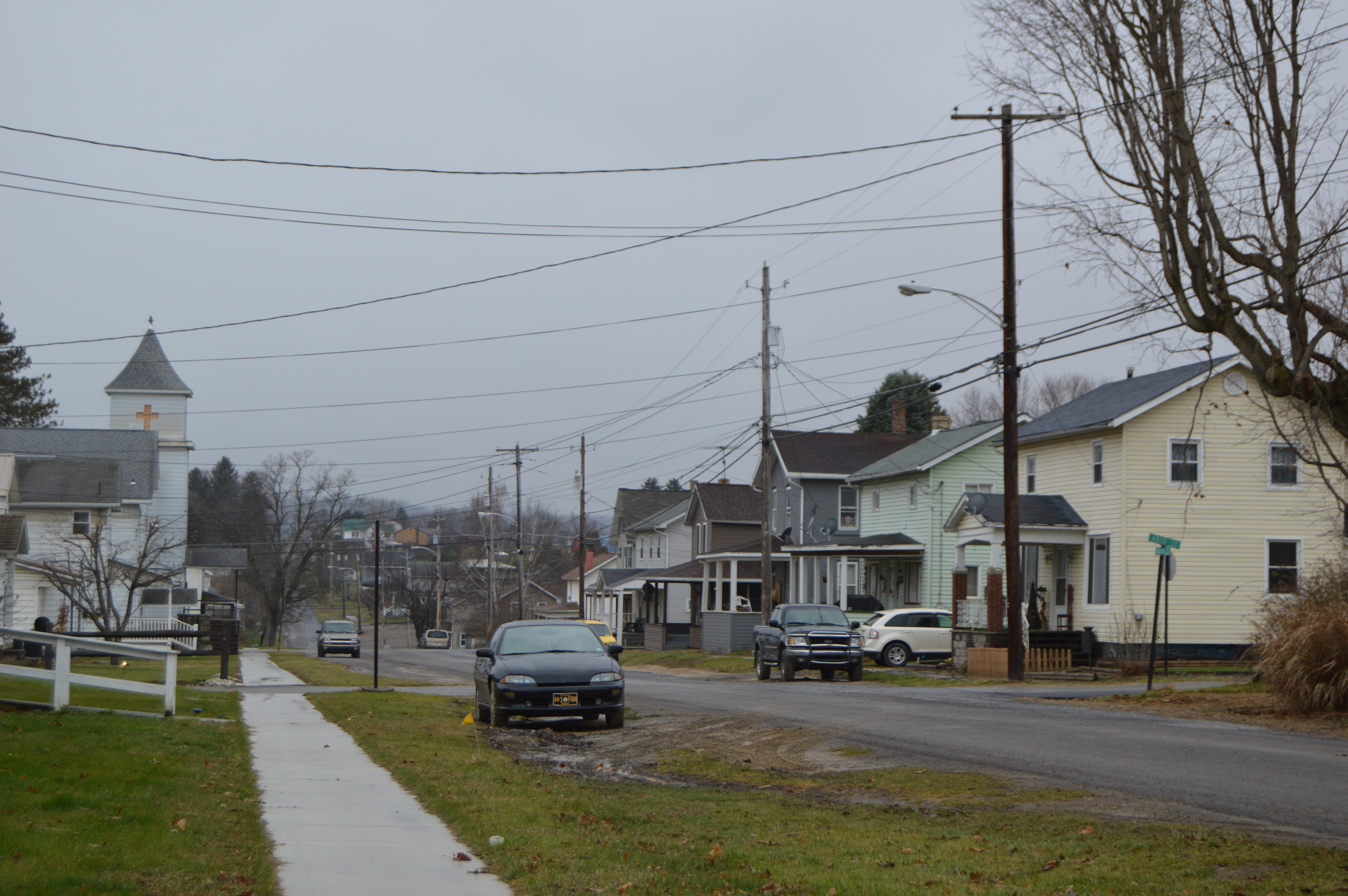
- Houses on Main Street; the Methodist church is at left

- Location of Hawthorn in Clarion County, Pennsylvania.

- Map showing Clarion County in Pennsylvania

- Location in Pennsylvania
- Coordinates: 41°01′14″N 79°16′27″W
- Country: United States
- State: Pennsylvania
- County: Clarion
- Incorporated: 1916

Government
  - Type: Borough Council

Area
  - Total: 1.08 sq mi (2.81 km^{2})
  - Land: 1.02 sq mi (2.65 km^{2})
  - Water: 0.058 sq mi (0.15 km^{2})
- Elevation: 1,105 ft (337 m)

Population (2020)
  - Total: 477
  - Density: 465.5/sq mi (179.73/km^{2})
- Time zone: UTC-5 (Eastern (EST))
  - Summer (DST): UTC-4 (EDT)
- ZIP code: 16230
- FIPS code: 42-33216
- Website: www.hawthornboro.org

Hawthorn is a borough in Clarion County, Pennsylvania, United States. The population was 482 at the 2020 census.

== Geography ==
Hawthorn is located in southeastern Clarion County at 41°1′14″N 79°16′27″W (41.020621, -79.274163), on the north side of Redbank Creek, a westward-flowing tributary of the Allegheny River. The creek forms the boundary with Armstrong County to the south.

Pennsylvania Route 28 passes through the borough, leading southwest (downstream) 4 miles (6 km) to New Bethlehem and northeast 9 miles (14 km) to Summerville.

According to the United States Census Bureau, Hawthorn has a total area of 1.08 square miles (2.81 km^{2}), of which 1.02 square miles (2.65 km^{2}) is land and 0.06 square miles (0.15 km^{2}), or 5.50%, is water.

== Demographics ==
Historical population
Census	Pop.	Note	%±
1880	290		—
1890	376		29.7%
1900	559		48.7%
1910	509		−8.9%
1920	665		30.6%
1930	571		−14.1%
1940	628		10.0%
1950	666		6.1%
1960	612		−8.1%
1970	552		−9.8%
1980	547		−0.9%
1990	528		−3.5%
2000	587		11.2%
2010	494		−15.8%
2020	477		−3.4%
2021 (est.)	480	▲	0.6%

As of the census of 2000, there were 587 people, 213 households, and 166 families residing in the borough. The population density was 529.9 inhabitants per square mile (204.6/km^{2}). There were 220 housing units at an average density of 198.6 per square mile (76.7/km^{2}). The racial makeup of the borough was 98.13% White, 1.36% African American, 0.17% from other races, and 0.34% from two or more races. Hispanic or Latino of any race were 0.34% of the population.

There were 213 households, out of which 37.1% had children under the age of 18 living with them, 62.4% were married couples living together, 11.7% had a female householder with no husband present, and 21.6% were non-families. 20.2% of all households were made up of individuals, and 13.6% had someone living alone who was 65 years of age or older. The average household size was 2.76 and the average family size was 3.12.

In the borough the population was spread out, with 29.5% under the age of 18, 7.7% from 18 to 24, 25.0% from 25 to 44, 23.5% from 45 to 64, and 14.3% who were 65 years of age or older. The median age was 34 years. For every 100 females there were 95.0 males. For every 100 females age 18 and over, there were 96.2 males.

The median income for a household in the borough was $26,771, and the median income for a family was $29,545. Males had a median income of $26,528 versus $20,250 for females. The per capita income for the borough was $13,146. About 14.0% of families and 16.5% of the population were below the poverty line, including 26.4% of those under age 18 and none of those age 65 or over.

== Education ==
- Redbank Valley School District - public school
