= Pansy, Pennsylvania =

Unincorporated community in Pennsylvania, U.S.

Coordinates: 41°02′30″N 79°09′05″W

Pansy is an unincorporated community in Jefferson County, in the U.S. state of Pennsylvania.

== History ==
A post office was established at Pansy in 1884, and remained in operation until 1950. In 1917, Pansy was one of four post offices in Beaver Township.
