= Langville, Pennsylvania =

Unincorporated community in Pennsylvania, U.S.

Coordinates: 41°02′08″N 79°10′35″W

Langville is an unincorporated community in Jefferson County, in the U.S. state of Pennsylvania.

== History ==
Langville was named in 1850 for John Lang, the owner of a local woolen mill. A post office called Langville was established in 1886, and remained in operation until 1918.
