= Madison Township, Clarion County, Pennsylvania =

Township in Pennsylvania, US

Coordinates: 40°59′10″N 79°27′29″W

- Township
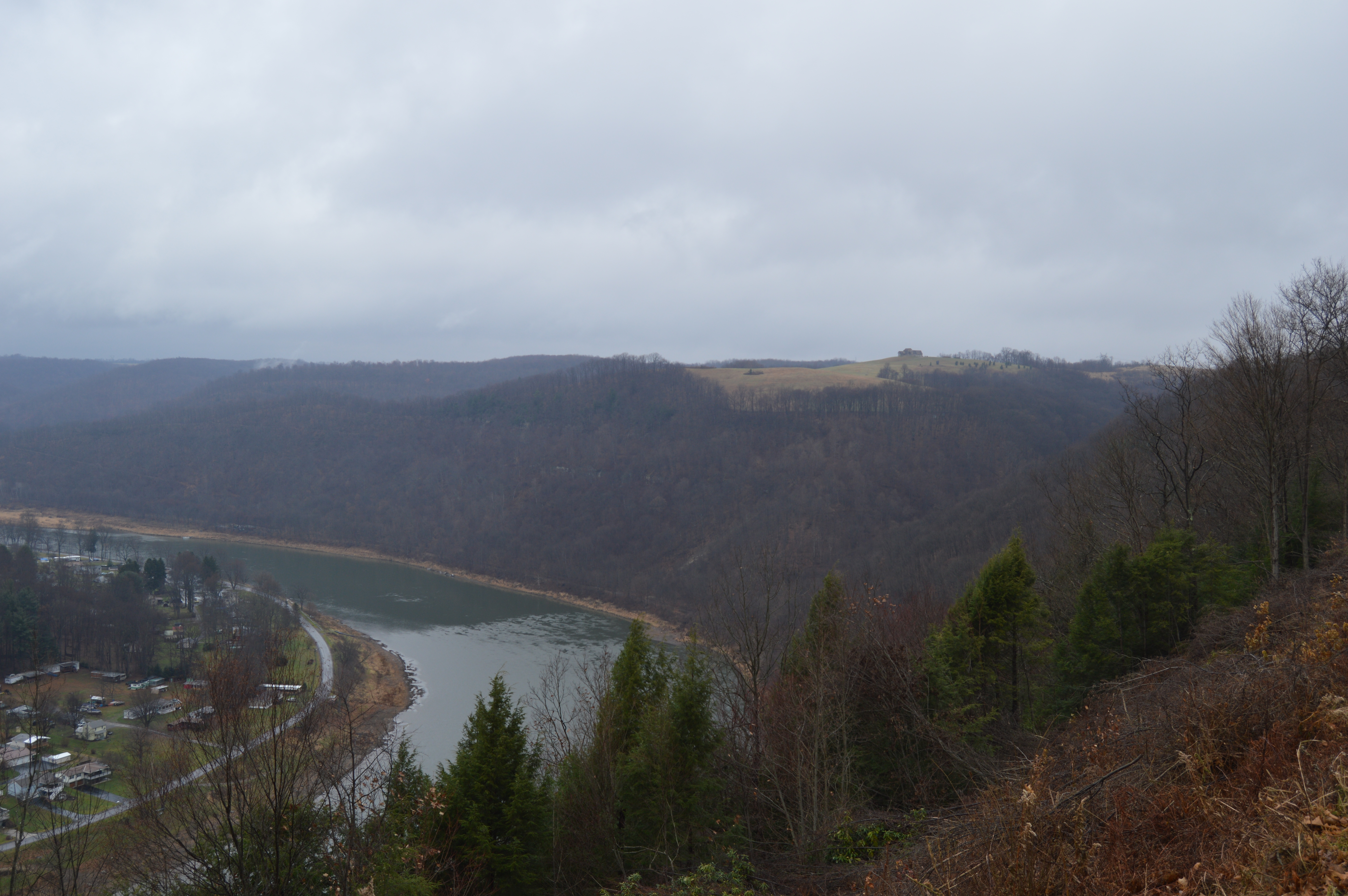
- Hillside over the Allegheny River

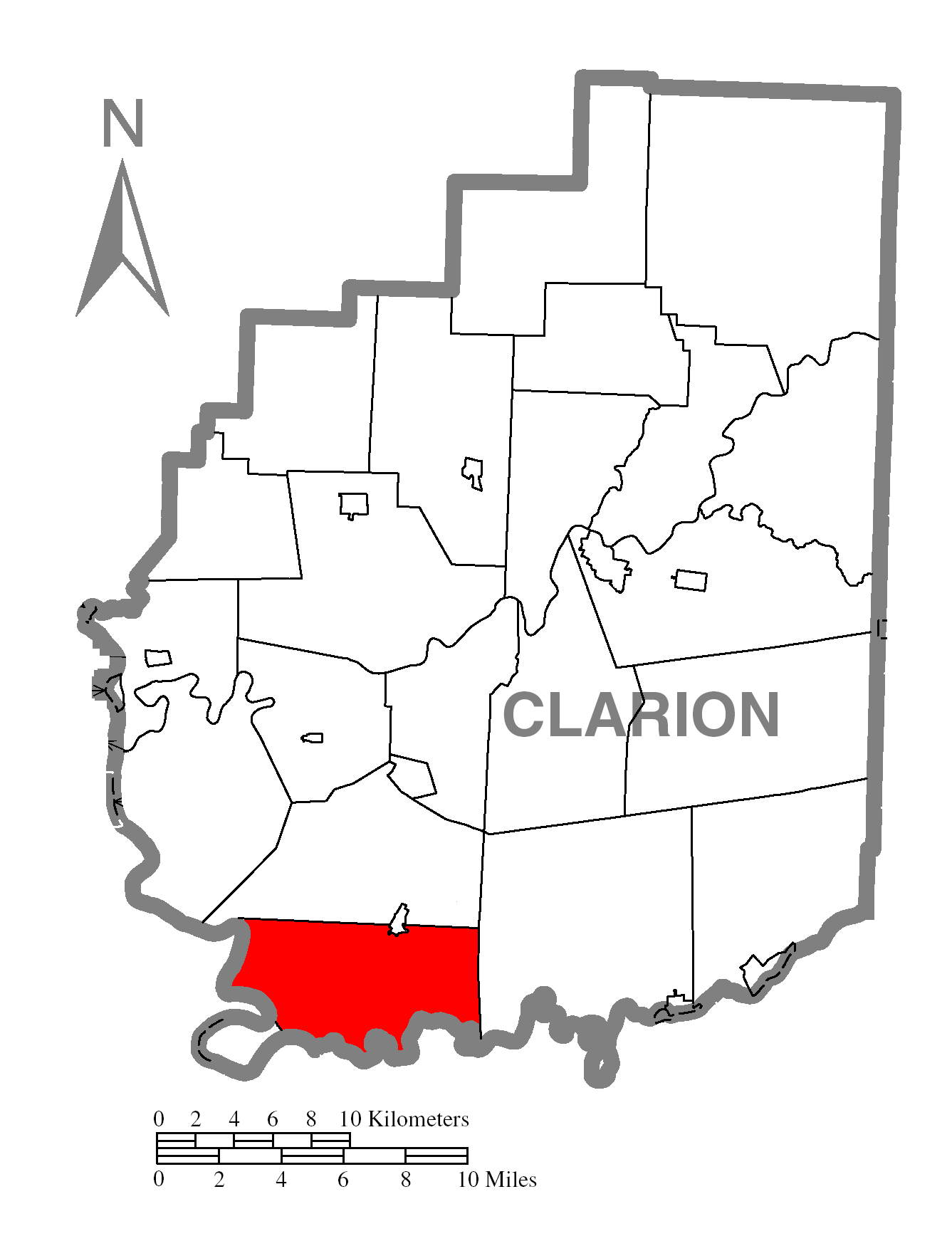
- Map of Clarion County, Pennsylvania highlighting Madison Township

- Map of Clarion County, Pennsylvania
- Country: United States
- State: Pennsylvania
- County: Clarion
- Settled: 1800

Area
  - Total: 27.75 sq mi (71.88 km^{2})
  - Land: 26.68 sq mi (69.10 km^{2})
  - Water: 1.07 sq mi (2.78 km^{2})

Population (2020)
  - Total: 1,163
  - Estimate (2021): 1,158
  - Density: 43.1/sq mi (16.66/km^{2})
- Time zone: UTC-5 (Eastern (EST))
  - Summer (DST): UTC-4 (EDT)
- FIPS code: 42-031-46464

Madison Township is a township in Clarion County, Pennsylvania, United States. The population was 1,163 at the 2020 census, a decrease from 1,207 in 2010, which represented, in turn, a decline from 1,442 in 2000.

== Geography ==
The township is in southwestern Clarion County, bordered on the west by the Allegheny River, on the south by Redbank Creek, and on the southwest by Brady Township, which occupies a bend in the Allegheny River. Armstrong County is to the west and south, across the two water bodies. There is also an overlook in Madison Township.

According to the United States Census Bureau, Madison Township has a total area of 27.8 square miles (71.9 km^{2}), of which 26.7 square miles (69.1 km^{2}) consists of land and 1.1 square miles (2.8 km^{2}), or 3.87%, consists of water.

== Demographics ==
Historical population
Census	Pop.	Note	%±
1990	1,423		—
2000	1,442		1.3%
2010	1,207		−16.3%
2020	1,163		−3.6%
2024 (est.)	1,134		−2.5%
U.S. Decennial Census

As of the census of 2000, there were 1,442 people, 562 households, and 408 families residing in the township. The population density was 53.1 inhabitants per square mile (20.5/km^{2}). There were 628 housing units at an average density of 23.1/sq mi (8.9/km^{2}). The racial makeup of the township was 99.72% White, 0.14% African American, 0.07% Native American, and 0.07% from two or more races. Hispanic or Latino of any race were 0.49% of the population.

There were 562 households, out of which 33.6% had children under the age of 18 living with them, 59.3% were married couples living together, 9.3% had a female householder with no husband present, and 27.4% were non-families. 24.4% of all households were made up of individuals, and 13.9% had someone living alone who was 65 years of age or older. The average household size was 2.57 and the average family size was 3.03.

In the township the population was spread out, with 26.1% under the age of 18, 7.2% from 18 to 24, 26.8% from 25 to 44, 23.7% from 45 to 64, and 16.2% who were 65 years of age or older. The median age was 38 years. For every 100 females there were 98.3 males. For every 100 females age 18 and over, there were 98.3 males.

The median income for a household in the township was $29,306, and the median income for a family was $35,096. Males had a median income of $28,500 versus $17,361 for females. The per capita income for the township was $13,867. About 9.2% of families and 11.1% of the population were below the poverty line, including 9.4% of those under age 18 and 6.3% of those age 65 or over.
