= Ohl, Pennsylvania =

Unincorporated community in Pennsylvania, United States

Coordinates: 41°05′00″N 79°09′39″W

Ohl is an unincorporated community in Jefferson County, in the U.S. state of Pennsylvania.

== History ==
A post office called Ohl was established in 1886, and remained in operation until 1933. The community was named for E. M. Ohl, a local merchant.
