= Heathville, Pennsylvania =

Unincorporated community in Pennsylvania, U.S.

Coordinates: 41°05′23″N 79°10′50″W

Heathville is an unincorporated community in Jefferson County, in the U.S. state of Pennsylvania.

== History ==
A post office called Heathville was in operation between 1841 and 1965. The community was named for a Judge Heath, who resided there.
