= Content, Pennsylvania =

Unincorporated community in Pennsylvania, U.S.

Coordinates: 41°06′36″N 79°08′40″W

Content is an unincorporated community in Jefferson County, in the U.S. state of Pennsylvania.

== History ==
A post office was established at Content in 1887, and remained in operation until it was discontinued in 1908.
