= Redbank Creek (Pennsylvania) =

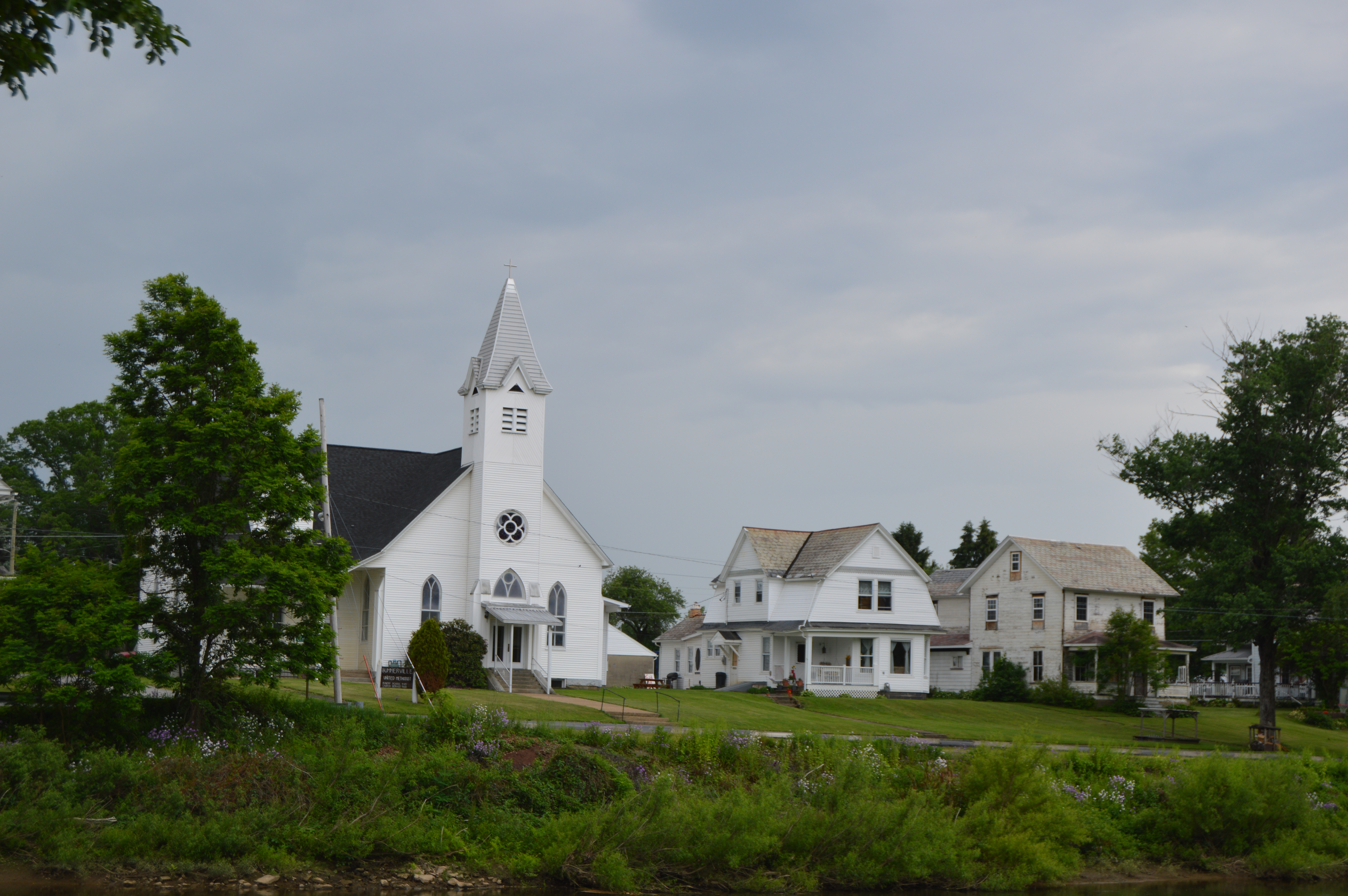
- Creekside scene in Summerville

Location
- Country: United States
- State: Pennsylvania

Physical characteristics
- Source
  - location: Brookville, Pennsylvania
  - coordinates: 41°09′30″N 79°04′36″W
  - elevation: 1,194 feet (364 m)
- Mouth
  - location: Allegheny River near East Brady
  - coordinates: 40°58′55″N 79°33′00″W
  - elevation: 823 feet (251 m)

Basin features
- River system: Allegheny River
- Tributaries
  - left: Sandy Lick Creek, Rattlesnake Run, Carrier Run, Beaver Run, Tarkiln Run, Red Run, Little Sandy Creek
  - right: North Fork Creek, Clement Run, Thompson Run, Simpson Run, Welch Run, Runaway Run, Patton Run, Miller Run, Pine Creek, Town Run, Middle Run, Leisure Run, Long Run, Leatherwood Run, Middle Run, Rock Run, Wildcat Run

Redbank Creek is a tributary of the Allegheny River in Clarion, Armstrong, and Jefferson counties, Pennsylvania in the United States.

Redbank Creek is born at the confluence of Sandy Lick Creek and the North Fork Creek in the borough of Brookville, then flows west to form the border between Clarion County on the north bank and Armstrong County on the south bank. The tributary Little Sandy Creek joins just upstream of the community of Mayport.

The stream flows 50.3 miles (81 km) to join the Allegheny River and about 64 miles upstream from its confluence, just downstream of the borough of East Brady.

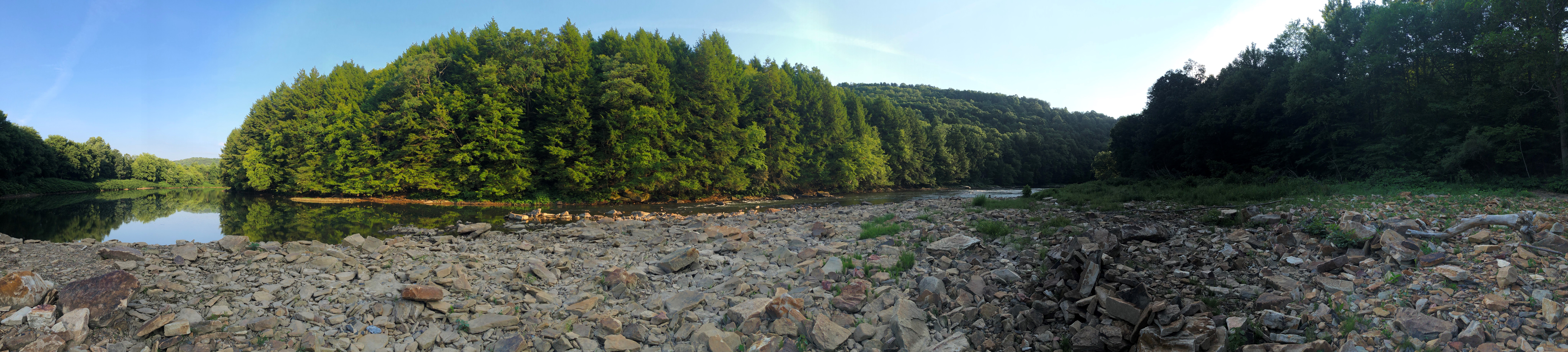
A panoramic view of the Redbank Creek from the mouth of Long Run, Clarion County.

== Political subdivisions ==
The political subdivisions Redbank Creek traverses, given in the order they are encountered traveling downstream, are as follows:

- Brookville
- Rose Township
- Clover Township
- Summerville
- Clover Township
- Beaver Township
- Redbank Township (Armstrong)
- Redbank Township (Clarion)
- Hawthorn
- Redbank Township (Clarion)
- Mahoning Township
- New Bethlehem
- South Bethlehem
- Mahoning Township
- Porter Township
- Madison Township (Clarion)
- Madison Township (Armstrong)

== Tributaries ==
The named tributaries of Redbank Creek, given in the order they are encountered traveling downstream, are as follows:

- Sandy Lick Creek
- North Fork Creek
- Clement Run
- Rattlesnake Run
- Thompson Run
- Simpson Run
- Welch Run
- Runaway Run
- Carrier Run
- Beaver Run
- Tarkiln Run
- Red Run
- Patton Run
- Little Sandy Creek
- Miller Run
- Pine Creek
- Town Run
- Middle Run
- Leisure Run
- Citizens Water Company Dam
- Long Run
- Leatherwood Creek
- Middle Run
- Rock Run
- Wildcat Run

== History ==
Redbank Creek was originally known by its native name "Lycamihoning." It was later changed to Sandy Lick, and in 1799 received its current name due to the red color of the soil along its banks.

== See also ==
- List of rivers of Pennsylvania
- List of tributaries of the Allegheny River
- Tributaries of Redbank Creek
