= Redbank Township, Clarion County, Pennsylvania =

Township in Pennsylvania, US

Coordinates: 41°04′15″N 79°16′08″W

- Township
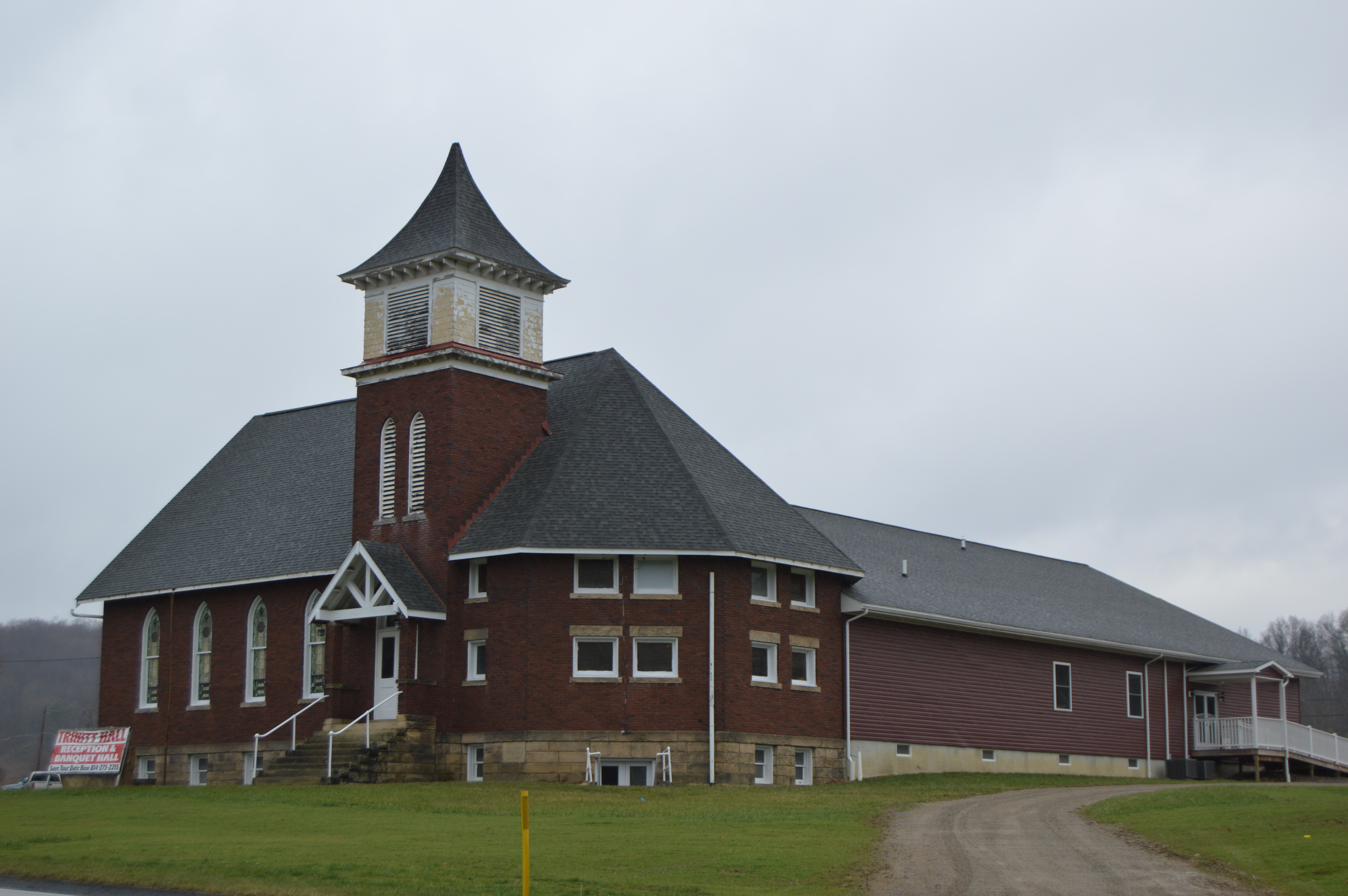
- Trinity Hall, a former church near Hawthorn

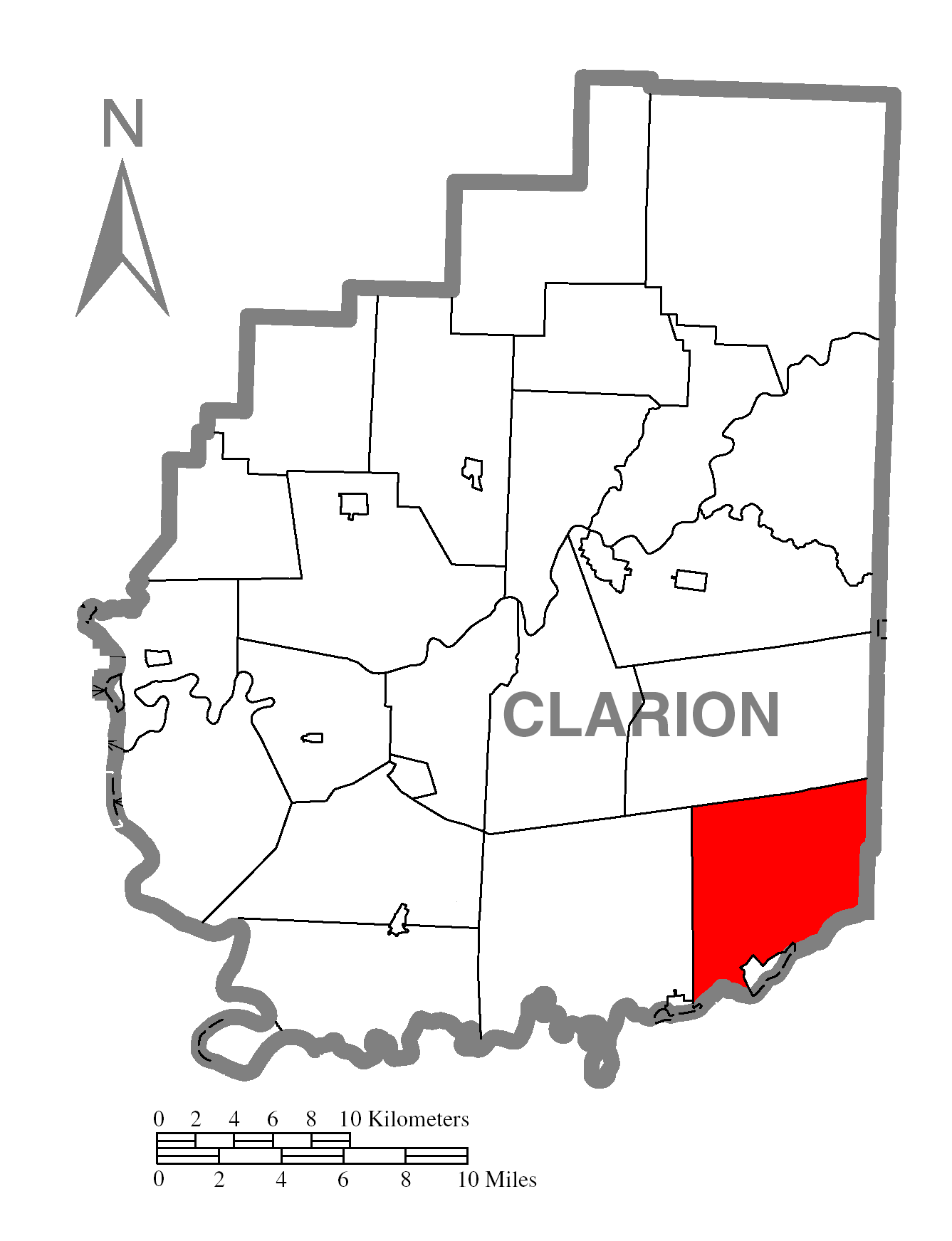
- Map of Clarion County, Pennsylvania highlighting Redbank Township

- Map of Clarion County, Pennsylvania
- Country: United States
- State: Pennsylvania
- County: Clarion
- Incorporated: 1806

Government
  - Type: A township of the second class, having a board of three supervisors.

Area
  - Total: 30.27 sq mi (78.41 km^{2})
  - Land: 30.05 sq mi (77.84 km^{2})
  - Water: 0.22 sq mi (0.57 km^{2})

Population (2010)
  - Total: 1,334
  - Estimate (2021): 1,330
  - Density: 43.4/sq mi (16.74/km^{2})
- Time zone: UTC-5 (Eastern (EST))
  - Summer (DST): UTC-4 (EDT)
- Area code: 814
- FIPS code: 42-031-63728

Redbank Township is a township in Clarion County, Pennsylvania, United States. The population was 1,334 at the 2020 census, a decrease from the figure of 1,370 tabulated in 2010.

== Geography ==
Redbank Township is in the southeastern corner of Clarion County and is bordered to the east by Jefferson County and to the south by Armstrong County and the borough of Hawthorn. The southern county boundary is formed by Redbank Creek, a west-flowing tributary of the Allegheny River. Directly across Redbank Creek to the south is a separate Redbank Township in Armstrong County.

According to the United States Census Bureau, the Clarion County Redbank Township has a total area of 30.3 square miles (78.4 km^{2}), of which 30.0 square miles (77.8 km^{2}) is land and 0.2 square miles (0.6 km^{2}), or 0.73%, is water.

== Demographics ==
Historical population
Census	Pop.	Note	%±
2010	1,370		—
2020	1,334		−2.6%
2021 (est.)	1,330		−0.3%
U.S. Decennial Census

As of the census of 2000, there were 1,502 people, 574 households, and 443 families residing in the township. The population density was 49.9 people per square mile (19.3 people/km^{2}). There were 615 housing units at an average density of 20.4 per square mile (7.9/km^{2}). The racial makeup of the township was 98.74% White, 0.07% African American, 0.47% Asian, and 0.73% from two or more races. Hispanic or Latino of any race were 0.33% of the population.

There were 574 households, out of which 31.0% had children under the age of 18 living with them, 66.7% were married couples living together, 6.1% had a female householder with no husband present, and 22.8% were non-families. 19.7% of all households were made up of individuals, and 10.5% had someone living alone who was 65 years of age or older. The average household size was 2.62 and the average family size was 3.00.

In the township the population was spread out, with 23.9% under the age of 18, 7.9% from 18 to 24, 28.8% from 25 to 44, 25.3% from 45 to 64, and 14.1% who were 65 years of age or older. The median age was 39 years. For every 100 females there were 107.5 males. For every 100 females age 18 and over, there were 102.7 males.

The median income for a household in the township was $31,622, and the median income for a family was $35,185. Males had a median income of $28,800 versus $18,452 for females. The per capita income for the township was $13,762. About 8.1% of families and 11.0% of the population were below the poverty line, including 15.6% of those under age 18 and 10.2% of those age 65 or over.
