= Summerville, Pennsylvania =

Borough in Pennsylvania, US

- Borough
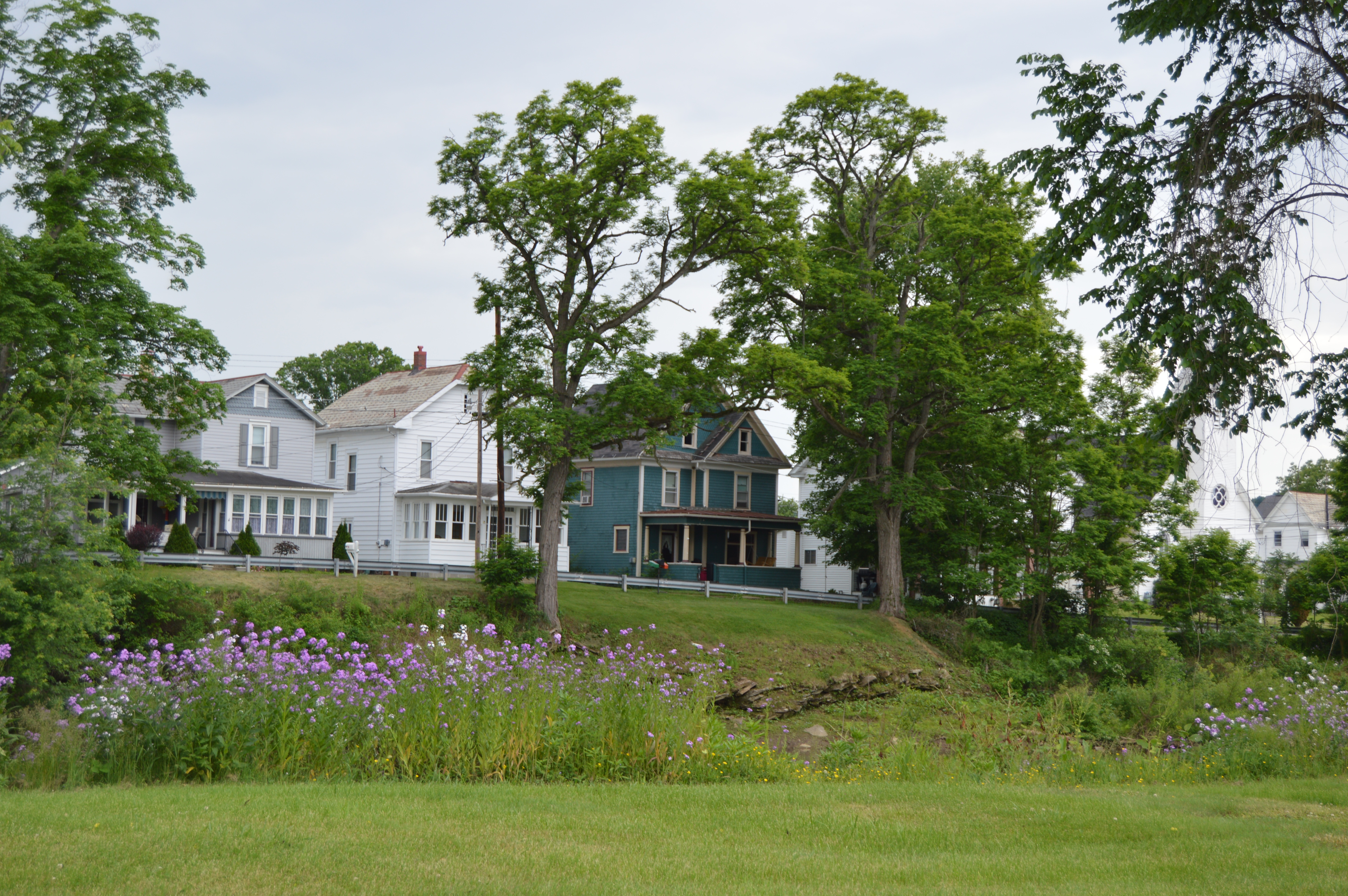
- Houses along Redbank Creek

- Location of Summerville in Jefferson County, Pennsylvania.

- Location within Pennsylvania Location within the United States
- Coordinates: 41°06′59″N 79°11′18″W
- Country: United States
- State: Pennsylvania
- County: Jefferson
- Settled: 1812
- Incorporated: March 15, 1887

Government
  - Type: Borough Council

Area
  - Total: 0.62 sq mi (1.61 km^{2})
  - Land: 0.59 sq mi (1.54 km^{2})
  - Water: 0.023 sq mi (0.06 km^{2})
- Elevation: 1,152 ft (351 m)

Population (2020)
  - Total: 504
  - Density: 812.3/sq mi (313.64/km^{2})
- Time zone: UTC-5 (Eastern (EST))
  - Summer (DST): UTC-4 (EDT)
- ZIP code: 15864
- Area code: 814
- FIPS code: 42-75168

Summerville is a borough in Jefferson County, Pennsylvania, United States. As of the 2020 census, Summerville had a population of 504.

== History ==
It was named after Summers Baldwin, the first settler in the area. It was formerly known as "Troy". The borough was incorporated in 1887.

== Geography ==
Summerville is located in western Jefferson County at 41°06′59″N 79°11′18″W, in the valley of Redbank Creek. Pennsylvania Route 28 (Harrison Street) passes through the north side of the borough, leading northeast up the creek valley 7 miles (11 km) to Brookville, the county seat, and southwest 12 miles (19 km) to New Bethlehem.

According to the United States Census Bureau, Summerville has a total area of 0.62 square miles (1.6 km^{2}), of which 0.02 square miles (0.06 km^{2}), or 4.02%, are water.

== Demographics ==
Historical population
Census	Pop.	Note	%±
1880	348		—
1890	338		−2.9%
1900	380		12.4%
1910	609		60.3%
1920	1,199		96.9%
1930	1,202		0.3%
1940	1,009		−16.1%
1950	933		−7.5%
1960	895		−4.1%
1970	859		−4.0%
1980	830		−3.4%
1990	675		−18.7%
2000	525		−22.2%
2010	528		0.6%
2020	504		−4.5%

At the 2000 census, there were 525 people, 209 households and 158 families residing in the borough. The population density was 843.6 per square mile (325.7/km^{2}). There were 241 housing units at an average density of 387.2 per square mile (149.5/km^{2}). The racial makeup of the borough was 98.10% White, 0.57% Native American, and 1.33% from two or more races.

There were 209 households, of which 29.2% had children under the age of 18 living with them, 61.2% were married couples living together, 10.0% had a female householder with no husband present, and 24.4% were non-families. 24.4% of all households were made up of individuals, and 13.9% had someone living alone who was 65 years of age or older. The average household size was 2.44 and the average family size was 2.88.

20.0% of the population were under the age of 18, 7.0% from 18 to 24, 30.3% from 25 to 44, 22.1% from 45 to 64, and 20.6% who were 65 years of age or older. The median age was 41 years. For every 100 females there were 92.3 males. For every 100 females age 18 and over, there were 90.9 males.

The median household income was $30,909 and the median family income was $38,000. Males had a median income of $26,792 compared with $18,409 for females. The per capita income was $16,745. About 3.2% of families and 6.1% of the population were below the poverty line, including 7.5% of those under age 18 and 2.7% of those age 65 or over.

== Education ==
Christ's Dominion Academy, a private Christian school, is located in the borough.
