= Pennsylvania House of Representatives, District 60 =

American legislative district

Pennsylvania's 60th State House of Representatives district
Representative
Abby Major; R–Ford City
- Population (2022): 64,259

The 60th Pennsylvania House of Representatives District is located in western Pennsylvania has been represented by Abby Major since 2021.

== District Profile ==
The 60th District is located in Armstrong County and Westmoreland County and includes the following areas:

Armstrong County

- Apollo
- Applewold
- Bethel Township
- Burrell Township
- Cadogan Township
- East Franklin Township
- Ford City
- Ford Cliff
- Freeport
- Gilpin Township
- Kiskiminetas Township
- Leechburg
- Manor Township
- Manorville
- North Apollo
- North Buffalo Township
- Parks Township
- South Bend Township
- South Buffalo Township
- West Kittanning

Westmoreland County

- Allegheny Township
- East Vandergrift
- Hyde Park
- Lower Burrell (part)
  - Ward 01
  - Ward 02
  - Ward 03
  - Ward 04 (part)
    - Division 02
- Vandergrift
- West Leechburg

== Representatives ==
Representative	Party	Years	District home	Note
Prior to 1969, seats were apportioned by county.
C. Doyle Steele	Democrat	1969 – 1972	Apollo	
John B. McCue	Republican	1973 – 1976	Kittanning	
Henry Livengood	Democrat	1977 – 1988	Ford City	Died in office 1988
Timothy L. Pesci	Democrat	1989 – 2000	Freeport	Elected on May 16, 1989, to fill vacancy Unsuccessful candidate for reelection
Jeff Coleman	Republican	2001 – 2005	Apollo	Did not seek reelection
Jeff Pyle	Republican	2005 – 2021	Ford City	Retired for health reasons
Abby Major	Republican	2021–Present	Leechburg	Incumbent. Elected on May 18, 2021, to fill vacancy

== Recent election results ==
PA House election, 2024: Pennsylvania House, District 60
Party	Candidate	Votes	%
Republican	Abby Major (incumbent)	Unopposed	
Total votes		30,718	100.00
Republican hold			

PA House election, 2022: Pennsylvania House, District 60
Party	Candidate	Votes	%
Republican	Abby Major (incumbent)	19,056	68.89
Democratic	Robert George	8,604	31.11
Total votes		27,660	100.00
Republican hold			

PA House special election, 2021: Pennsylvania House, District 60
Party	Candidate	Votes	%
Republican	Abby Major	10,116	72.60
Democratic	Frank Prazenica	3,249	23.32
Libertarian	Andrew Hreha	568	4.08
Total votes		13,933	100.00
Republican hold			

PA House election, 2020: Pennsylvania House, District 60
Party	Candidate	Votes	%
Republican	Jeff Pyle (incumbent)	Unopposed	
Total votes		29,898	100.00
Republican hold			

PA House election, 2018: Pennsylvania House, District 60
Party	Candidate	Votes	%
Republican	Jeff Pyle (incumbent)	Unopposed	
Total votes		19,079	100.00
Republican hold			

PA House election, 2016: Pennsylvania House, District 60
Party	Candidate	Votes	%
Republican	Jeff Pyle (incumbent)	23,937	86.85
Green	Gabe Lytle	3,625	13.15
Total votes		27,562	100.00
Republican hold			
