= List of reporting marks: K =

Note: Marks ending in U are for container owners; marks ending in X are not common carriers; marks ending in Z are for trailers without flanged wheels. All other marks are of common-carrier railroads.

== K ==
- KABX - Kaber Company, Canadian Resource Distribution, Inc.
- KACX - Kaiser Aluminum and Chemical Corporation
- KAIX - Rinker Materials Corporation
- KAMX - Kamen, Inc.
- KARX - Hamilton Elevators
- KBSR - Kankakee, Beaverville and Southern Railroad
- KBSZ - Kankakee, Beaverville and Southern Railroad
- KCCX - Kennecott Utah Copper Corporation
- KCDX - Eastman Kodak Company
- KCGX - Kaiser Cement Corporation, Southdown, Inc.
- KCIX - ARCO Chemical Company, Nova Chemicals, Inc.
- KCLX - Kansas City Power and Light Company
- KCMO - Kansas City, Mexico & Orient
- KCMX - Kidd Creek Mines, Ltd.
- KCNW - Kelley's Creek and Northwestern Railroad
- KCPX - Kemira Chemicals Canada, Inc.
- KCR - Keewatin Railway Company
- KCRX - Kootenay Central Rail Services, Ltd.
- KCS - Kansas City Southern Railway
- KCSM - Kansas City Southern de Mexico
- KCSU - Kansas City Southern Railway
- KCSZ - Kansas City Southern Railway
- KCT - Kansas City Terminal Railway
- KCTV - KCT Railway
- KCWB - Kansas City Westport Belt
- KCWX - Kimberly-Clark of Canada, Ltd.
- KDCX - Eastman Chemical Canada, Inc.
- KDEX - GLNX Corporation
- KE - Kansas Eastern Railroad
- KEBX - Ronald L. Boothman Remainder Trust
- KELX - Kellogg Company
- KENN - Kennecott Company Railroad
- KENX - KENX Associates
- KET - Kennewick Terminal Railway
- KEWH - Kewash Railroad
- KEYX - Keywell Corporation
- KFGX - Knauf Fiber Glass, GmbH
- KFMX - Oils Unlimited
- KFPX - Koppers Company, Inc.
- KFR - Kettle Falls International Railway
- KFTX - J and J Railcar Leasing, LLC
- KGCX - Koppers Company, Inc., INDSPEC Chemical Corporation
- KGFX - Kingsford Company
- KGLX - Commonwealth Edison Company
- KGRX - Kasgro Rail Corporation
- KIIX - Koppers Industries, Inc.
- KJR - Kiski Junction Railroad
- KJRY - Keokuk Junction Railway
- KKLU - K Line
- KKLZ - K Line
- KKRR - Knox and Kane Railroad
- KKRX - Kaskaskia Regional Port District Railroad
- KKTU - Kerr Steamship K Line
- KLCU - IBJ Leasing Company, Ltd.
- KLL - Klickitat Log and Lumber, J. Neils, St. Regis Paper Co.
- KLSC - Kalamazoo, Lake Shore and Chicago Railway
- KLSX - Kerford Limestone Company
- KM - Kansas and Missouri Railway and Terminal Company
- KMCU - Mitsui O.S.K. Lines, Ltd.
- KMCX - Kerr-Mcgee Coal Corporation
- KMEU - K Line
- KMFX - Kaolin Mushroom Farms, Inc.
- KMLX - Kodiak Mining
- KMTU - Hyundai Merchant Marine (America), Inc.
- KMTX - Kinder Morgan, Inc.
- KMTZ - Hyundai Merchant Marine (America), Inc.
- KMUX - Kershaw Manufacturing Company
- KNC - Kingcome Navigation
- KNDX - Golden State Metals, Inc., KND Rail Services, Inc.
- KNLU - Nedlloyd Lines
- KNOR - Klamath Northern Railway
- KNOX - Philips Metals, Inc.
- KNWA - Kanawha River Railroad
- KO - Kansas and Oklahoma Railroad
- KOAX - Coca-Cola USA a division of the Coca-Cola Company
- KOG - Kansas, Oklahoma and Gulf Railway; Missouri Pacific Railroad; Union Pacific Railroad
- KPCX - Koppers Company, Inc., Koppers Industries, Inc.
- KPCZ - K and P Cartage Company
- KPGX - Kentucky Processing Company
- KPLU - K Line
- KPLX - Koppel, Inc., Western Resources, Inc.
- KPPX - KRATON Polymers US, LLC
- KPR - Kelowna Pacific Railway, Ltd.
- KPRR - Kodak Park Railroad
- KPRX - Kauai Plantation Railway
- KPXX - Progress Rail Services Corporation
- KRDX - KRDX Company
- KRIX - GE Rail Services Corporation
- KRL - Kasgro Rail Lines
- KRPX - Associated Electric Cooperative, Inc.
- KRR - Kiamichi Railroad
- KRSX - Kurguz Enterprises, Inc. (Kurguz Railway Services)
- KRXX - Knife River Corp.
- KRT - Kanawha River Terminal
- KSCU - Korea Shipping Corporation
- KSCZ - Korea Shipping Corporation
- KSMX - Kosmos Cement Company, Inc.
- KSPX - K+S Potash Canada GP
- KSRY - Kosciusko and Southwestern Railway
- KSW - Kansas and Oklahoma Railroad
- KT - Kentucky and Tennessee Railway
- KTR - Kendallville Terminal Railway
- KTTX - Trailer Train Company, TTX Company
- KTX - ACF Industries, Inc.
- KUCX - Kentucky Utilities Company
- KVR - Kern Valley Railroad
- KV&W - Kansas City, Kaw Valley and Western Railway
- KWCU - World Container Leasing, Inc.
- KWT - K.W.T. Railway
- KWTR - Keota Washington Transportation Company
- KWUX - Utility Power Corporation, Siemens Westinghouse Power Corporation
- KXHR - Knoxville and Holston River Railroad
- KYLE - Kyle Railroad
- KYLU - NYK Line
- KYRX - Progress Rail Services Corporation
