= Oil City Pennsylvania Railroad Bridge =

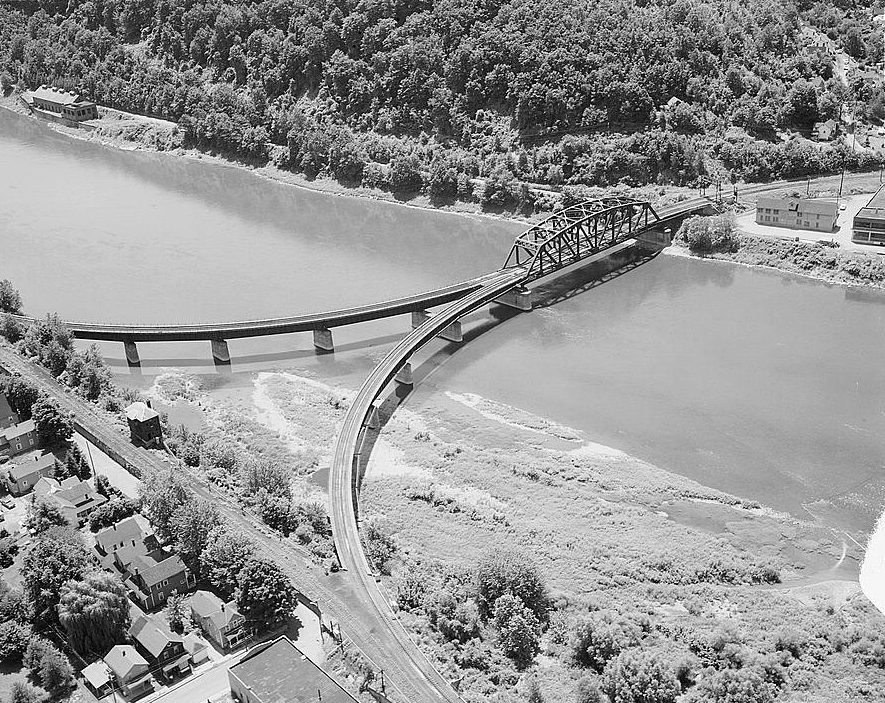
- Coordinates: 41°25′21″N 79°41′52″W
- Carries: Oil City Industrial Track
- Crosses: Allegheny River
- Locale: Cranberry Township and Oil City, Pennsylvania
- Other name(s): Pennsylvania Railroad, Allegheny River Bridge

Characteristics
- Design: Truss bridge

History
- Opened: September 29, 1930
- Closed: 2024

Location
- Interactive map of Oil City Pennsylvania Railroad Bridge

The Oil City Pennsylvania Railroad Bridge is an American out of service truss bridge that carries the Western New York and Pennsylvania Railroad (WNY&P) across the Allegheny River between Cranberry Township and Oil City, Pennsylvania.

== History and architectural features ==
The current bridge is the fourth structure at the current location. The Allegheny Valley Railroad reached Venango City, across the Allegheny from Oil City, on January 8, 1868. It completed a new bridge over the river on February 2, 1870. The railroad replaced the bridge with a new 678-foot (207 m) wooden Howe truss bridge in 1880. The Allegheny Valley Railway, successor to the Allegheny Valley Railroad, replaced this bridge in 1895 with a steel bridge.

The current bridge was built by the Pennsylvania Railroad, successor to the Allegheny Valley Railway, and opened on September 29, 1930. This new bridge was designed as a wye, with spans heading northwest toward Oil City and northeast toward Warren, Pennsylvania.

After the breakup of the Pennsy, Conrail took ownership of the line. The breakup of these companies resulted in the reassignment of operational rights to Norfolk Southern; the WNY&P took ownership in 2006 as it extended its trackage from Meadville, Pennsylvania to Oil City.

Because the bridge once served as a major junction point for several Pennsylvania Railroad lines, it features a unique approach structure. One section ran from Oil City through Tidioute, Pennsylvania and then on to Warren, Pennsylvania. This line was operated until 1976. It was removed during the early 1980s.

In early 2024, the Western New York & Pennsylvania Railroad ran the last train over the bridge.

== See also ==
- List of bridges documented by the Historic American Engineering Record in Pennsylvania
- List of crossings of the Allegheny River
