= Jeff Coleman =

American politician (born 1975)

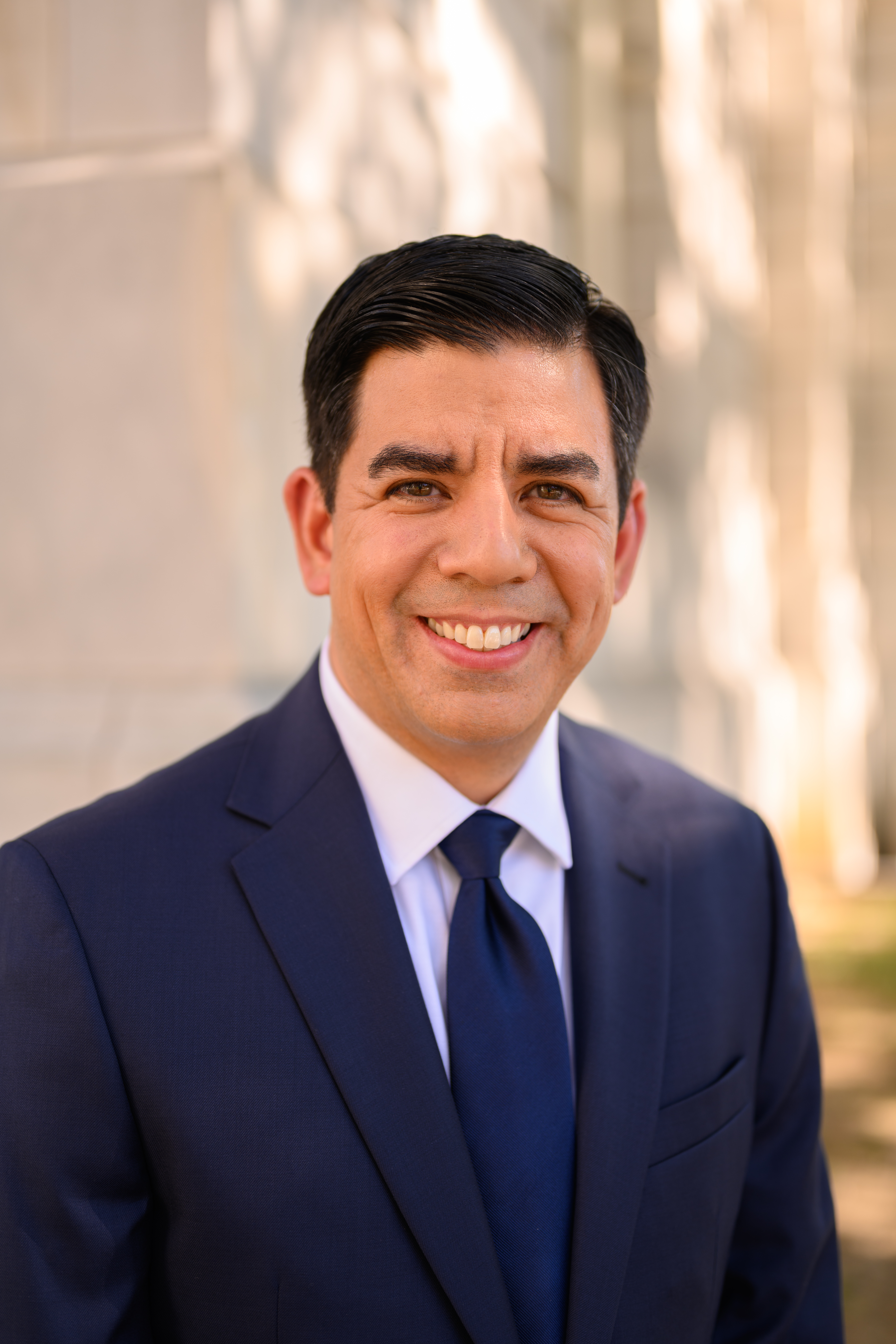

Member of the Pennsylvania House of Representatives from the 60th district
- In office January 2, 2001 – November 30, 2004
- Preceded by: Timothy Pesci
- Succeeded by: Jeffrey Pyle

Personal details
- Born: July 4, 1975 (age 51) Whidbey Island Naval Base
- Party: Republican
- Spouse: Rebecca
- Children: 4
- Education: Liberty University (BS)

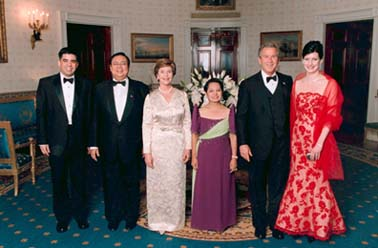
The Colemans with President George W. Bush, First Lady Laura Bush, Philippines President Gloria Macapagal Arroyo, and Jose Miguel Arroyo in 2003

Jeff Coleman (born July 4, 1975) is a former Republican member of the Pennsylvania House of Representatives.

== Background ==
Coleman was born to a Filipino American family at Whidbey Island Naval Base in Washington in 1975. In the 1980s his family returned to Manila, Philippines to serve as missionaries. It was during that time that the Philippines experienced the People Power Revolution, which Coleman credits for inspiring his "passion for public service." He graduated from Orchard Hills Christian Academy in 1994. He attended Liberty University, earning his degree in Government in 2001. Prior to elective office, Coleman worked in a grocery store, waited tables, and was as radio news anchor in college. He also worked as an intern for Pennsylvania Senator Rick Santorum and was elected to Apollo Borough Council.

== Political career ==
In the 2000 election for the 60th legislative district, the 25-year-old Coleman defeated long-time Democratic incumbent Tim Pesci in spite of the district being 70% Democratic. Coleman's under-funded campaign relied on an aggressive "door-to-door" campaign with hundreds of campaign volunteers. Bill DeWeese, the House Democratic Leader, said that Pesci had run a "condescending" race against Coleman, calling his opponent "Jeffy" and describing Coleman's campaign volunteers as "the Children from the Corn," referring to the horror film. He ran unopposed for reelection in 2002.

In a 2002 PoliticsPA Feature story designating politicians with yearbook superlatives, he was named the "Most Ambitious"

Coleman surprised political observers by retiring prior to the 2004 elections to host a Harrisburg-based political radio program. In 2010, Politics Magazine named him one of the most influential Republicans in Pennsylvania, noting his success as a political consultant.

Coleman unsuccessfully sought the 2022 Republican nomination for lieutenant governor, coming in fifth place in the May 2022 primary election:

2022 Republican primary, Pennsylvania lieutenant governor
Party	Candidate	Votes	%
Republican	Carrie DelRosso	318,537	25.66
Republican	Richard Saccone	195,171	15.72
Republican	Theodore Daniels	150,749	12.14
Republican	Clarice D. Schillinger	147,705	11.90
Republican	Jeffrey H. Coleman	125,059	10.07
Republican	James E. Jones	113,183	9.12
Republican	Russell H. Diamond	73,751	5.94
Republican	John A. Brown	58,961	4.75
Republican	Christopher C. Frye, Jr.	58,403	4.70
Total votes			100.00%

Pennsylvania House of Representatives
Preceded by Timothy Pesci	Member of the Pennsylvania House of Representatives from the 60th district 2001–2004	Succeeded by Jeffrey Pyle
