= C. Doyle Steele =

American politician

Member of the Pennsylvania House of Representatives from the 60th district
- In office 1969–1972
- Preceded by: District created
- Succeeded by: John B. McCue

Member of the Pennsylvania House of Representatives from the Armstrong County district
- In office 1967–1968

Personal details
- Born: October 26, 1921 Apollo, Pennsylvania
- Died: December 19, 1999 (aged 78) Homosassa Springs, Florida
- Party: Democratic

C. Doyle Steele (October 26, 1921 – December 19, 1999) was a Democratic member of the Pennsylvania General Assembly.

He married his wife Dianne in 1955. His parents were Cyrus S. and Sarah Bowman Steele.

Steele practiced law in Apollo, Pennsylvania from 1953 until 1999, after serving in the U.S. Navy during World War II. A graduate of Temple University in Philadelphia, Doyle was elected burgess of Apollo in 1954, serving two consecutive terms until 1961. From 1967 to 1971, he served in the Pennsylvania House of Representatives.
