= Jeff Pyle =

American politician (1964–2022)

Member of the Pennsylvania House of Representatives from the 60th district
- In office January 4, 2005 – March 16, 2021
- Preceded by: Jeff Coleman
- Succeeded by: Abby Major

Personal details
- Born: August 30, 1964 Kittanning, Pennsylvania, U.S.
- Died: September 14, 2022 (aged 58) Ford City, Pennsylvania, U.S.
- Party: Republican
- Education: West Virginia University (BA); Indiana University of Pennsylvania (BS)

Jeffrey Paul Pyle (August 30, 1964 – September 14, 2022) was an American politician and educator who served as a Republican member of the Pennsylvania House of Representatives from 2005 to 2021, representing the 60th legislative district.

== Early life and education ==
Pyle was born in Kittanning, Pennsylvania. He earned a Bachelor of Arts degree in political science from West Virginia University in 1986 and received his teaching certificate from Indiana University of Pennsylvania in 1991.

== Career ==
A year after receiving his teacher's certification, Pyle went on to teach American history and government at Ford City High School as well as social studies at Shannock Valley Jr./Sr. High School. He was recognized for his efforts in and out of the classroom, being named "Educator of the Year" within his school district in 1999 and "Conservation Educator of the Year" in 2000.

In 2004, Pyle was the mayor of Ford City, Pennsylvania receiving over 61% of the vote. He was re-elected in 2006 with over 70% and again in 2008 running unopposed.

=== Pennsylvania House of Representatives ===
Pyle ran for the 60th Legislative District seat after incumbent Jeff Coleman declined to seek another term. Coleman then publicly endorsed Pyle as his successor through a series of campaign ads.

In his first term, Pyle introduced legislation to increase the penalties on drug delivery resulting in death. This passed the house 199-0 but was not considered by the Senate. He also worked on legislation to provide property tax relief by raising the state sales tax by 1%. The amendment failed by a few votes.

In 2007, Pyle was appointed a Deputy Whip and chaired the Task Force on Drugs and Law Enforcement. His work greatly enabled the decision of Allegheny Technologies Inc to build their hot strip mill in Brackenridge which solidified ATI's western Pennsylvania steel making and those jobs for the next century to come. He also served on the following committees: Environmental Resources and Energy (chair of the subcommittee on Mining), Labor Relations, Liquor Control and as the Republican Secretary of Transportation (chair of the subcommittee on Aviation). In addition, he served on the House Republican Policy Committee and was a member of the Firefighters and Sportsmen's Caucuses Executive Board and chaired the Coal and Diabetes Caucuses.

In 2014 there was a chemical spill of MCHM that polluted the drinking water of 300,000 people around Charleston, West Virginia. The MCHM remaining in the damaged tanks was moved from West Virginia to Rosebud Mining's Dutch Run coal preparation plant near Elderton, Pennsylvania, within Pyle's district, in February, 2014. Reacting to news that Washington lawmakers want more oversight of MCHM, Representative Pyle said training of emergency responders makes sense, but requiring federal oversight of something that's been used for fifty years is "capricious".

In 2020, Pyle suffered a stroke. His continued rehabilitations and cancer treatments forced him to retire from the House on March 16, 2021.

=== Controversy ===
In January 2021, Pyle posted a meme on his personal Facebook account mocking Joe Biden's appointee for Assistant Secretary for Health, Rachel Levine. Critics characterized the post as transphobic, and the LGBTQ+ Equality Caucus of the Pennsylvania House of Representatives called for Pyle to be reprimanded. In response, Pyle issued an apology.

== Personal life and death ==
Pyle was a survivor of kidney cancer, which was discovered shortly after his election. He underwent surgery and made a full recovery. He remained very active with the American Cancer Society and its Relay for Life over a five county area. Unfortunately, Pyle's cancer returned in 2017. He continued to serve while receiving treatment, but after his cancer worsened, he resigned his seat in 2021, one year after suffering a stroke. His chief of staff, Abby Major, successfully ran for his seat in a special election in May of that same year. Pyle continued to make appearances with Major after she took office as often as his declining health would permit.

Pyle died in Ford City, Pennsylvania, from cancer on September 14, 2022, at the age of 58. He was survived by his wife Michelle and two daughters.
