= Henry Livengood =

American politician (1933–1988)

Member of the Pennsylvania House of Representatives from the 60th district
- In office January 3, 1977 – December 17, 1988
- Preceded by: John B. McCue
- Succeeded by: Timothy Pesci

Personal details
- Born: September 16, 1933 Manor Township, Pennsylvania
- Died: December 17, 1988 (aged 55) Ford City, Pennsylvania
- Party: Democratic
- Spouse: Cheryl Jenkins (1954 - 1982, her death) Donna Shotts (1984 - 1988, his death)
- Children: 6

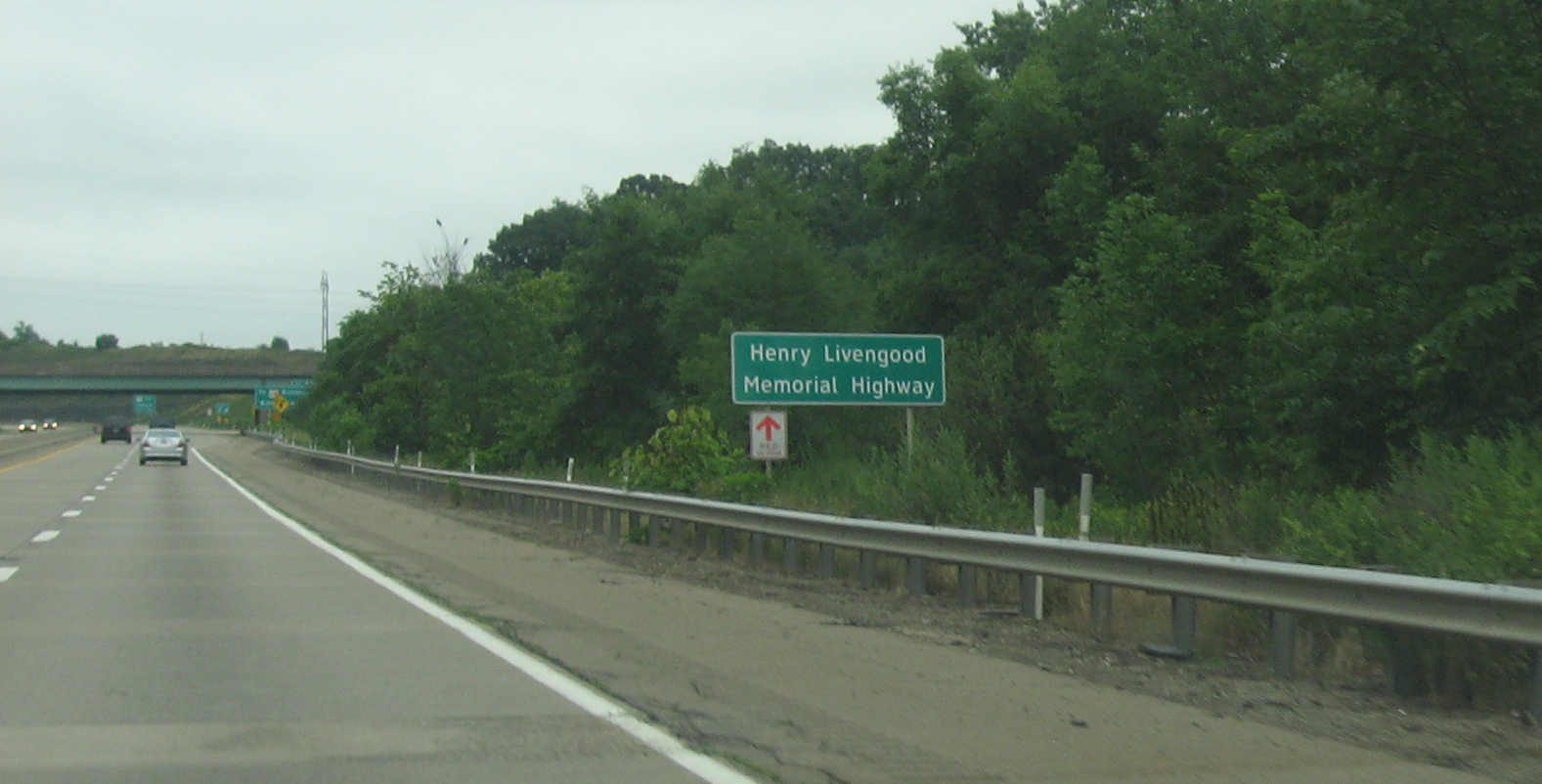
The Henry Livengood Memorial Highway of the U.S. Route 422 near Kittanning, Pennsylvania.

Henry Louis Livengood (September 16, 1933 – December 17, 1988) was a Democratic member of the Pennsylvania House of Representatives.

== Early life and career ==
Livengood was born in McGrann, a small borough between Kittanning and Ford City, as one of six children of Glenn and Helen Lukehart Livengood. The couple had three sons and three daughters, with one son dying in infancy.

He moved to the latter years later and remained there until his death. A 1951 graduate of Ford City High School, Livengood served in the U.S. Navy during the Korean War from 1951 to 1953.

He married the former Cheryl Faye Jenkins in 1954, and together they had six children (Karen Watterson, Kimberly Benigni, Kathie Olinger, Kelly Szymanski, Keith Livengood, & Kristen Livengood). Cheryl died from breast cancer on October 27, 1982, and he remarried Donna Shotts Thompson on February 17, 1984.

Livengood's first public service began seven years prior to the legislature in 1970, when he was selected to a council seat in Manorville borough. One year later, he was elected to the office of Armstrong County Recorder of Deeds, register of wills, and clerk of orphans' court. He held this office until his death in 1988.

Livengood was first elected to the 60th Legislative District in 1976. Among his accomplishments were the start of construction of the A-15 bypass, the fabled 'missing link' that joined Route 422 in Manor Township with State Routes 66 and 28. Though Livengood died before construction was complete, his legacy was memorialized when the road was finally completed and opened in 2001 as the Henry Livengood Highway. Livengood also championed the construction of the Armstrong County Airport in South Buffalo Township.

Livengood developed a reputation of easy accessibility to his constituents, with some dropping by his home late in the evening, and never turned anyone away who asked for his help.

Livengood served in the legislature until his death in December 1988, just over a month after winning election to his sixth term in office over his Republican challenger, realtor John Oliver.

== Death ==
Livengood had a history of heart-related ailments for most of his adult life, having suffered a heart attack fifteen years prior to his death, and undergoing two heart bypass surgeries. Livengood died of a massive heart attack he suffered while shoveling snow at his residence on December 17, 1988. Livengood, who was 55 at the time of his death, was buried in Ford City Cemetery. His wife Donna ran in a special election to fill his vacant seat the following year but lost to Democrat Tim Pesci.
