= Apollo-Ridge School District =

School district in Pennsylvania

Coordinates: 40.568°N 79.358°W

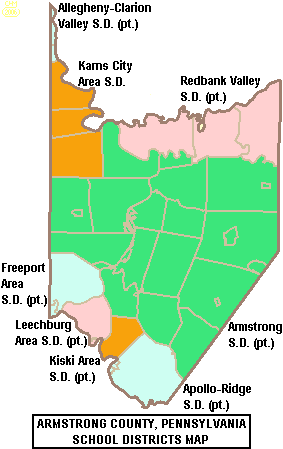

Address
- 1825 State Road 56 Spring Church, Pennsylvania, 15686; United States

District information
- Type: Public
- Established: 1970

Students and staff
- District mascot: Viking
- Colors: Blue and Gold

Other information
- Website: www.apolloridge.com

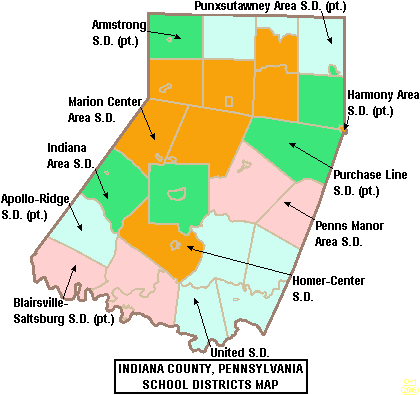
Apollo-Ridge School District region in Westmoreland County

The Apollo-Ridge School District is a small rural public school district. Apollo-Ridge School District encompasses approximately 70 square miles (180 km^{2}) spanning small portions of two counties. In Armstrong County, it covers the boroughs of Apollo and North Apollo and Kiskiminetas Township. In Indiana County, it covers Young Township. According to 2000 federal census data, it serves a resident population of 11,202. In 2009, the district residents’ per capita income was $15,287, while the median family income was $39,070. In the Commonwealth, the median family income was $49,501 and the United States median family income was $49,445, in 2010.

The district operates three schools: Apollo-Ridge High School, Apollo-Ridge Middle School and Apollo-Ridge Elementary School.
