= Pennsylvania House of Representatives, District 61 =

American legislative district

Pennsylvania's 61st State House of Representatives district
Representative
Liz Hanbidge; D–Blue Bell
- Population (2022): 63,924

The 61st Pennsylvania House of Representatives District is located in southeast Pennsylvania and has been represented by Liz Hanbidge since 2019.

== District Profile ==
The 61st District is located in Montgomery County and includes the following areas:

- Lower Gwynedd Township
- North Wales
- Towamencin Township
- Upper Gwynedd Township
- Whitpain Township (part)
  - District 01
  - District 02
  - District 03
  - District 04
  - District 05
  - District 06
  - District 07
  - District 12

== Representatives ==
Representative	Party	Years	District home	Note
Prior to 1969, seats were apportioned by county.
William H. Claypoole	Republican	1969 – 1970		
John B. McCue	Republican	1971 – 1972		Moved to the 60th District
District moved from Armstrong County to Montgomery County in 1972.
Patrick McGinnis	Republican	1973 – 1978		
Joseph M. Gladeck, Jr.	Republican	1979 – 2000		
Kate M. Harper	Republican	2001 – 2019	Lower Gwynedd Township	
Liz Hanbidge	Democratic	2019 – present	Blue Bell	Incumbent

== Recent election results ==
PA House election, 2024: Pennsylvania House, District 61
Party	Candidate	Votes	%
Democratic	Liz Hanbidge (incumbent)	25,068	60.88
Republican	Michelle Rupp	16,109	39.12
Total votes		41,177	100.00
Democratic hold			

PA House election, 2022: Pennsylvania House, District 61
Party	Candidate	Votes	%
Democratic	Liz Hanbidge (incumbent)	21,435	62.08
Republican	Jessie Bradica	13,092	37.92
Total votes		34,527	100.00
Democratic hold			

PA House election, 2020: Pennsylvania House, District 61
Party	Candidate	Votes	%
Democratic	Liz Hanbidge (incumbent)	25,065	59.83
Republican	Florence Friebel	16,832	40.17
Total votes		41,897	100.00
Democratic hold			

PA House election, 2018: Pennsylvania House, District 61
Party	Candidate	Votes	%
Democratic	Liz Hanbidge	17,689	53.76
Republican	Kate Harper (incumbent)	15,214	46.24
Total votes		32,903	100.00
Democratic gain from Republican			

PA House election, 2016: Pennsylvania House, District 61
Party	Candidate	Votes	%
Republican	Kate Harper (incumbent)	20,458	56.53
Democratic	Robert Wilkinson	15,732	43.47
Total votes		36,190	100.00
Republican hold			
