= Allegheny Branch =

The Allegheny Branch, also known as the Allegheny Subdivision, is a partially-abandoned railway line in the United States. It was built between 1852 and 1870 by the Allegheny Valley Railroad as that company's main line. It became part of the Pennsylvania Railroad network in 1900. At its fullest extent the line ran 132 miles (212 km) between Pittsburgh, Pennsylvania, and Oil City, Pennsylvania. Today, the Allegheny Valley Railroad, unrelated to the original company, owns the section between Pittsburgh and Arnold, Pennsylvania, while a small section in Oil City belongs to the Norfolk Southern Railway and is leased by the Western New York and Pennsylvania Railroad. The remainder has been abandoned. Much of the former right-of-way has been converted to rail trails.

== History ==
The Allegheny Valley Railroad completed its initial line between Pittsburgh, Pennsylvania, and the Kiskiminetas River in October 1855 for a distance of 29 miles (47 km). The line followed the east bank of the Allegheny River. A further 13 miles (21 km), completed on December 11, 1855, extended the line to the mouth of the Crooked Creek, south of Kittanning, Pennsylvania. The 2-mile (3.2 km) extension to Kittanning itself opened on January 23, 1856. Thereafter construction stalled because of the financial weakness of the Allegheny Valley Railroad.

Construction resumed in July 1863, and the line was extended a further 10 miles (16 km) north to the Mahoning Creek in April 1866. The line reached Bradys Bend on June 27, 1867, and finally Venango City, across the Allegheny from Oil City, on January 8, 1868. The Allegheny Valley Railroad completed a new bridge over the river on February 2, 1870. In Oil City, it connected with the Oil Creek and Allegheny River Railway. The total length of the main line (or "River Division") was 132 miles (212 km).

The Allegheny Valley Railroad was reorganized as the Allegheny Valley Railway in 1892. The Pennsylvania Railroad, long involved with both railroad's affairs, leased Allegheny Valley Railway in 1900 and merged it in 1910. The line was initially grouped in the railroad's Buffalo and Allegheny Valley Division, and, with the lines of the Oil Creek and Allegheny River Railway and Western New York and Pennsylvania Railway, formed a through route between Pittsburgh and Buffalo, New York, via Corry, Pennsylvania.

=== Conrail ===
The Pennsylvania Railroad merged with the New York Central Railroad in 1968 to form the Penn Central Transportation Company. Under Penn Central the line remained physically intact, with the portion between Brady and Oil City known as the Oil City Secondary. With the Penn Central's bankruptcy the line's future became uncertain. The United States Railway Association initially recommended that three segments not be conveyed to Conrail:

- between Arnold, Pennsylvania, and Kiskiminetas Junction (near Schenley, Pennsylvania)
- between Templeton, Pennsylvania, and Red Bank (near Brady)
- between Brady and Emlenton, Pennsylvania

In the end, the entire line was conveyed to Conrail, and remained intact until 1984. Conrail abandoned 35.6 miles (57.3 km) between Templeton and Emlenton (via Red Bank) and 10.06 miles (16.19 km) between Arnold and Kiskiminetas Junction on May 14, 1984, and further abandoned 33.21 miles (53.45 km) between Emlenton and Oil City on August 9. Conrail abandoned 23.8 miles (38.3 km) between Schenley and Templeton on June 8, 1989.

=== Short lines ===
Conrail sold the line between Pittsburgh and Arnold to the new Allegheny Valley Railroad in 1995. That same year, Conrail sold the remaining track around Kiskiminetas Junction, including the bridge over the Kiskiminetas River, to Berkman Rail Services. Berkman established the Kiski Junction Railroad to operate the line. The Kiski Junction Railroad ceased operations in 2021 and abandoned the line.

On the northern end of the line, a short section remained running southwest from Oil City across the Allegheny River to various industries on the south side of Oil City. This line passed to the Norfolk Southern Railway when Conrail was broken up in 1999. Norfolk Southern leased it, along with other properties, to the Western New York and Pennsylvania Railroad in 2005.

== Features ==
The most significant bridge on the line is the bridge over the Allegheny at Oil City. The original opened in 1870, and was replaced in 1880. The Allegheny Valley Railway built a new steel bridge in 1895. The Pennsylvania Railroad replaced that bridge with a new structure in 1930. This new bridge was designed as a wye, with spans heading northwest toward Oil City and northeast toward Warren, Pennsylvania.

Also significant is the Kiski Junction Bridge, which crosses the Kiskiminetas River. The river was first crossed in 1853–1855. The Allegheny Valley Railroad constructed a new iron bridge on the site in 1869. That bridge was destroyed in a flood on February 22, 1898, and replaced by a steel bridge. The new bridge was of a through truss design, 712 feet 8 inches (217.22 m) long, with three spans.

== Rail trails ==
The right-of-way between Kiskiminetas Junction and milepost 75, near Upper Hillville in Clarion County, is now the Armstrong Trail. The Tredway Trail extends from the south side of the Kiskiminetas River to Braeburn. As of 2025 the two trails are separated by the Norfolk Southern's Conemaugh Line.
