= Glen Allen Grubbs =

American businessman and executive (1930–2018)

- Born: May 22, 1930; Apollo, Pennsylvania
- Died: December 20, 2018 (aged 88)
- Organization: Raytheon

Glen Allen Grubbs (May 22, 1930 – December 20, 2018) was an American businessman and executive, most closely associated with Raytheon Company, where he was employed for more than 20 years.

== Early life and education ==
Born in Apollo, Pennsylvania, on May 22, 1930, Grubbs primarily grew up on a rural farm with his siblings attending a schoolhouse with only one room. After the family relocated to Erie, Pennsylvania, in the early 1940s, he attended Strong Vincent High School in Erie, where he earned a varsity letter in baseball, and received his high school diploma in 1948. Shortly after graduating from high school, Grubbs and his brother Bill enlisted in the U.S. Navy, where they served honorably for four years. While employed at Raytheon, Grubbs furthered his education by attending the business school at Northeastern University in Boston, Massachusetts.

== Career ==
After his Honorable Discharge from the US Navy in 1952, Grubbs settled with his wife in Massachusetts. By 1953 he had landed an entry-level position at Raytheon Company, working on the Hawk Missile Systems assembly line, and soon thereafter was promoted to supervisor. He eventually attained an important and highly responsible management position in the mid-60s, becoming the Missile Systems Quality Control Manager, overseeing as many as 3,000 employees.

From the mid 1960s to the late 1970s, Grubbs was largely responsible for and instrumental in Raytheon's development of the Air Defense System of the kingdom of Saudi Arabia.

In 1967, Grubbs and his family moved to Jeddah, Saudi Arabia at Raytheon's complex. As a friend of the royal Saudi family, Grubbs was able to negotiate and secure billions of dollars in Hawk Missile Systems contracts; including installation and maintenance services of these missile systems, and formal education of many thousands of native Saudis to operate the defense system. In addition, his close relationships with members of the royal family enabled him to serve the kingdom and the royal family in several other capacities for Whittaker Corporation, Litton Corporation, and Orion Corporation well into the 1990s.

In early 1972, Grubbs and his team of Raytheon contract specialists in Jeddah were engaged in advanced discussions with Prince Sultan and Prince Khalid bin Sultan on price and availability of the new munitions. By late 1972, Grubbs informed the Raytheon Executives that the next Improved Hawk Missile contract would probably involve somewhere between $400 million and $800 million in purchases by Saudi Arabia directly from Raytheon.

The Grubbs's work contributed to the exponential growth of Raytheon from a fledgling diode and defense electronics company into one of the largest guided missiles manufacturer in the world.

== Personal life ==
Grubbs married twice. While in the U.S Navy, stationed in Boston, he met Jean Louise Honnors, a student at Dean Junior College. They married in 1952 and went on to have 8 children between the years of 1952 and 1965. They divorced in 1969. Grubbs subsequently married Claire Corriveau in 1970, an executive secretary at Raytheon, and soon thereafter adopted her only son Robert, who was a hemophiliac.

== See also ==
- Raytheon
