= Kiski Junction Railroad =

Overview
- Headquarters: Schenley, Pennsylvania
- Reporting mark: KJR
- Locale: Armstrong County, Pennsylvania, in the Pittsburgh area
- Dates of operation: 1995–2021

Technical
- Track gauge: 4 ft 8 1/2 in (1,435 mm) standard gauge

The Kiski Junction Railroad (reporting mark KJR) was a short-line railroad that operated in Western Pennsylvania near the city of Pittsburgh. The railroad was based in the small community of Schenley which is situated at the point where the Kiskiminetas River flows into the Allegheny River. The KJR functioned as both a freight hauler and a tourist railroad. The railroad suspended all rail operations after the 2016 season and was officially closed and abandoned in 2021.

== History ==
The name for the railroad was taken from a point on the Pennsylvania Railroad where the PRR's Conemaugh Line (the former Western Pennsylvania Railroad) and Allegheny Branch (former Allegheny Valley Railroad) met. This point was at the south end of the Kiski Junction Railroad's bridge, where the KJR would interchange with Norfolk Southern.

The section of the Kiski Junction Railroad's line that ran from the former Kiski Junction, across the bridge over the mouth of the Kiskiminetas River, and along the Allegheny River, was part of the Pennsylvania Railroad's line from Pittsburgh to Oil City, Pennsylvania. There was also a branch line that ran southeast towards Bagdad, Pennsylvania. Portions of that line were built over the former Western Division of the Pennsylvania Canal. With the exception of the Bagdad Branch and about a mile of former mainline track, Conrail abandoned the line in the late 1980s, and removed the rails in 1992. The line north of Schenley was purchased by the Armstrong Trail Association, and converted into the Armstrong rail trail. The trail is part of the proposed Erie to Pittsburgh Trail.

=== Extension ===
In 2008, former Pennsylvania Governor Ed Rendell announced that the Kiski Junction would be awarded a state grant of $4 million to extend the line 9 miles north of Schenley to the mouth of Crooked Creek. The line was extended to serve the Logansport Mine (operated by Rosebud Mining Co.) in Logansport. Construction commenced in 2010 and ended in 2011. The line ended just 2 miles south of Ford City. The railroad saw potential in Ford City and at one point, considered linking up with the borough.

== Railroad description ==
From 1995 to 2016, the KJR ran special passenger excursions in the summer months, as well as fall foliage rides and Christmas runs. Their primary customer was the Rosebud Mine in Logansport, several miles north of Schenley. Rail operations to the mine were suspended after the 2016 season. Another customer was the Allegheny Technologies plant in Gilpin Township, Pennsylvania which closed shortly before mine operations were suspended. There was also a small feed mill located at the north end of the railyard in Schenley which halted operations with the railroad after the bridge over the Kiski River closed in 2017. Built in 1899, the bridge over the Kiski River was the highlight of the tourist train. After returning from the Bagdad Branch or the mainline, the train would go over the bridge to give passengers views of both the Kiski and Allegheny Rivers before returning to Schenley.

=== Locomotives ===
KJR #7135 is the main locomotive of the railroad. An Alco S-1 type locomotive, 7135 was built for the US Army in 1943. It served military facilities at Aberdeen Proving Ground, Maryland (World War II), and Fort Dix before being turned over to the South Branch Valley Railroad. The KJR purchased the 7135 in 1995.

In 2013 the KJR purchased former Lehigh Valley Railroad #126, an EMD SW900 class locomotive which was being used at Rosebud Mining's Lady Jane Mine near Penfield, PA. After the LV dissolved in 1976 the locomotive served many years as Conrail #8653. When Conrail itself dissolved twenty years later, 8653 found work at the Lady Jane mine where it was repainted but kept its CR number. When the KJR gained ownership of the locomotive, it was given back its original LV number and was repainted back to a "retro style" LV paint scheme while still retaining KJR reporting marks.

The Kiski Junction used modern Norfolk Southern locomotives to haul coal from the Logansport Mine since the train would be later interchanged to NS after returning to Schenley. Plus, the coal train could have been anywhere from 100 to 150 carloads which would have been too great of power for the much older 7135 and 126.

Image	No.	Model	Builder	Built	Notes
	7135	S-1	American Locomotive Company	1943	Came to KJR in 1995.
	126	EMD SW900	Electro-Motive Division		Came to KJR in 2013. Painted in Lehigh Valley paint scheme.

Former Locomotives

Image	No.	Model	Builder	Built	Notes
	752	EMD GP7	Electro-Motive Division	1951	Low nose, no dynamic brakes. Purchased by New Castle Industrial Railroad in 2013.
