= Abby Major =

American politician

Member of the Pennsylvania House of Representatives from the 60th district
- Incumbent
- Assumed office June 7, 2021
- Preceded by: Jeff Pyle

Personal details
- Party: Republican
- Children: 1
- Education: Southern Illinois University Carbondale (BS)

Military service
- Branch/service: United States Army
- Years of service: 2004–2007

Abigail E. Major is an American politician serving as a member of the Pennsylvania House of Representatives from the 60th district. She was elected in a March 2021 special election and assumed office on June 7, 2021.

== Early life and education ==
A native of Ford City, Pennsylvania, Major graduated from Ford City High School. She then joined the United States Army, serving as an intelligence analyst from 2004 to 2007. After leaving the Army, she attended the Pittsburgh Institute of Mortuary Science and earned a Bachelor of Science degree in mortuary science from Southern Illinois University Carbondale.

== Career ==
Major previously worked as the funeral director of the Curran-Shaffer Funeral Home. She later joined the staff of State Rep. Jeff Pyle, serving as a legislative assistant and later as his chief of staff. Major was elected to the Pennsylvania House of Representatives in a May 2021 special election to succeed Pyle. She assumed office on June 7, 2021. She was re-elected for a full term in 2022.

In March 2023, after a lobbyist and a campaign manager for Democratic state representative Michael Zabel accused him of sexual harassment, Major accused him of sexual harassing her as well. Zabel resigned due to these allegations.

== Electoral history ==
2021 Pennsylvania House of Representatives, District 60 special election
Party	Candidate	Votes	%
Republican	Abby Major	10,116	72.60%
Democratic	Frank C. Prazenica	3,249	23.32%
Libertarian	Andrew Hreha	568	4.08%
Total votes		13,933	100%
Republican hold			

2022 Pennsylvania House of Representatives, District 60 election
Party	Candidate	Votes	%
Republican	Abby Major (incumbent)	19,056	68.89%
Democratic	Robert George	8,604	31.11%
Total votes		27,660	100%
Republican hold			
