= Butler County Community College =

College in Butler Township, Pennsylvania, U.S.

Coordinates: 40.8297°N 79.9120°W

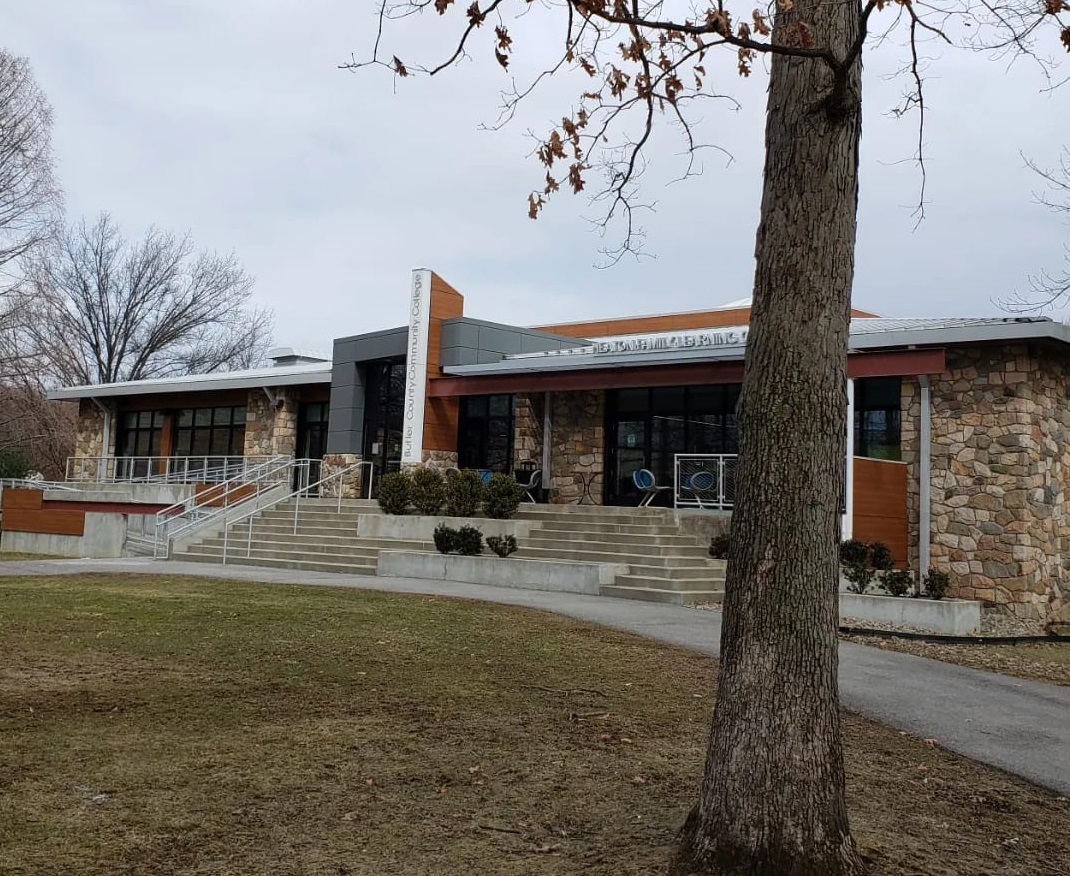
- Other name: BC3
- Motto: "The Smart Place to Start"
- Type: Public community college
- Established: 1965
- Affiliations: Butler County Vo-Tech./Butler School District
- President: Megan M. Coval
- Faculty: 309
- Students: 1,967 full-time, 1,689 part-time
- Location: Butler, Pennsylvania, United States
- Campus: 323 acres (131 ha)
- Colors: Navy Blue and White
- Mascot: Pioneers
- Website: www.bc3.edu

Butler County Community College (BC3) is a public community college in Butler Township, Pennsylvania. It also offers courses in Cranberry Township, as well as in Lawrence, Mercer, and Jefferson counties. Over 100,000 students have attended.

== Locations ==
- Main campus in Butler Township
- BC3 @ Cranberry in Cranberry Township, Pennsylvania
- BC3 @ Lawrence Crossing in New Castle, Pennsylvania
- BC3 @ Linden Pointe in Hermitage, Pennsylvania
- BC3 @ Brockway in Brockway, Pennsylvania
- BC3 @ Armstrong in Ford City, Pennsylvania

Students are able to take courses at multiple campuses if convenient. The 2011 spring semester is the first semester that the Upper Allegheny campus(es) offered courses. In September 2021, college administrators broke ground on a new campus facility in Ford City.

== Academics ==
BC3 offers certificates and 2-year degrees in the fields of business, nursing and health, humanities and social sciences, and science and technology.

The college is institutionally accredited by the Middle States Commission on Higher Education. Specific programs are accredited by:

- Accreditation Council for Business Schools and Programs
- Accreditation Commission for Education in Nursing (ACEN)
- American Association of Medical Assistants

== Notable alumni ==
- Timothy L. Pesci (A.S. 1972) – Pennsylvania State Representative 1989–2000
