= Gwynedd Mercy Academy High School =

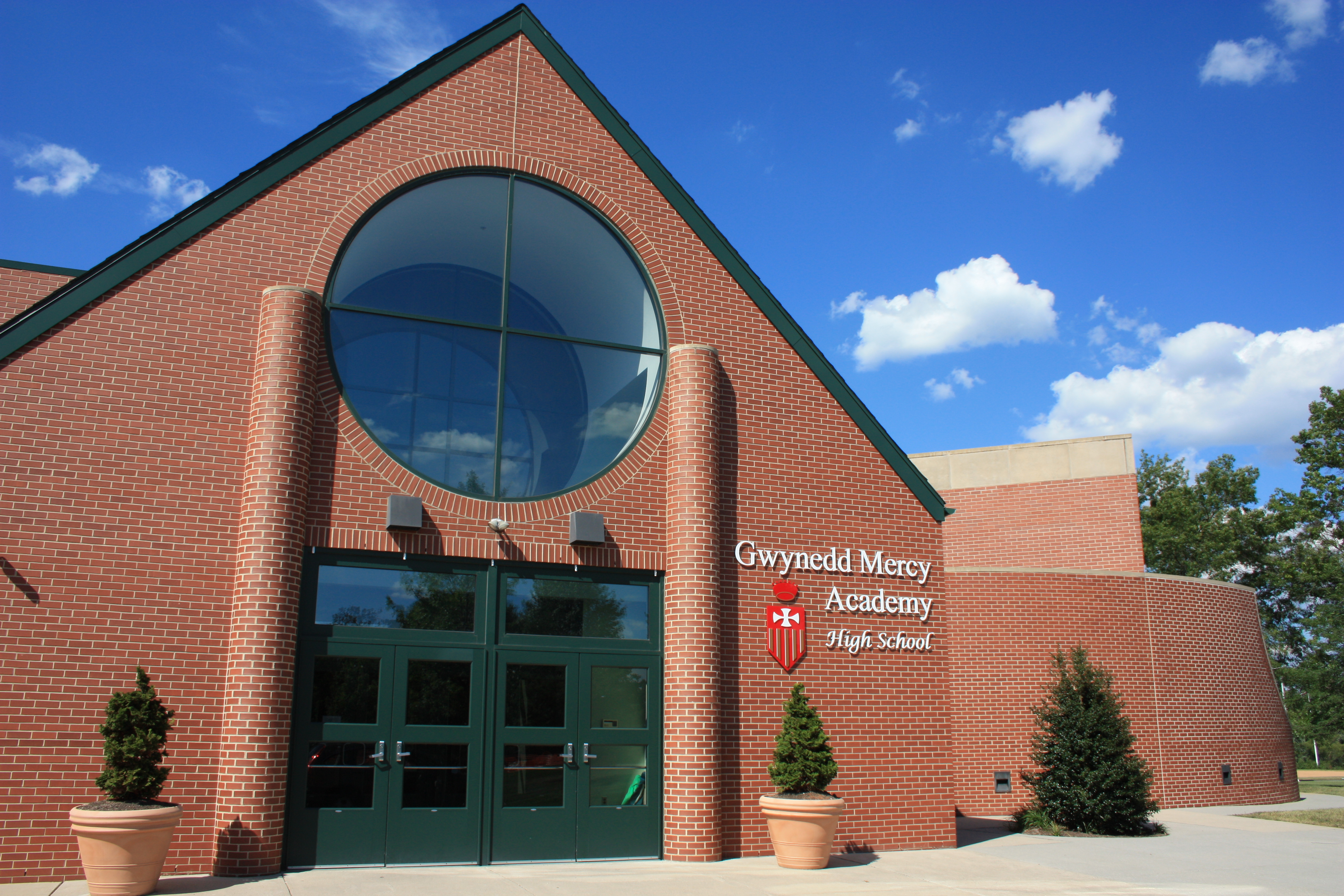

Location
- 1345 Sumneytown Pike; Lower Gwynedd, (Montgomery County), Pennsylvania 19002; United States; 40°11′46″N 75°14′34″W

Information
- Type: Private, All-Female
- Religious affiliations: Roman Catholic, Sisters of Mercy
- Established: 1861; 165 years ago
- CEEB code: 391600
- President: Denise Corkery Marbach
- Principal: Eileen Carty
- Grades: 9-12
- Average class size: 18
- Student to teacher ratio: 10:1
- Colors: Red and gold
- Team name: Monarchs
- Rival: Mount Saint Joseph Academy
- Accreditation: Middle States Association of Colleges and Schools
- Publication: The Imagination Collaboration
- Newspaper: Magnet
- Yearbook: Patrician
- Tuition: $20,900
- Website: www.gmahs.org

Gwynedd Mercy Academy High School is a private, Roman Catholic, all-girls high school in Gwynedd Valley, Pennsylvania. It is located on the campus of Gwynedd Mercy University and is operated within the Archdiocese of Philadelphia.

== History ==
Gwynedd Mercy Academy High School was established as the Academy of the Sisters of Mercy in 1861 by the Sisters of Mercy. The school shares a campus with Gwynedd-Mercy College. In 1861, the Sisters of Mercy established the Academy of the Sisters of Mercy in Philadelphia.

The Academy began in Assumption Parish and later changed location to a residence at Broad Street and Columbia Avenue in Philadelphia. By August 1863, there were 28 students. Over the years the Academy experienced many changes and eventually moved to the Taylor Estate in Gwynedd Valley, where the Sisters converted stables and erected a science building to serve the Academy and College from 1947 to 1955. In April 1955, construction of the building for the elementary and secondary schools was completed and the Academy of Mercy became Gwynedd Mercy Academy.

Enrollment continued to increase and in 1982, the Sisters of Mercy purchased the Spring House Public School to house the elementary division. The high school remained in the facility that was built in 1955.

== Campus ==
Gwynedd Mercy Academy High School shares a campus has had expansion projects completed in 1999 and 2004. The first phase of construction was completed in August 1999. A new library, Art and Music rooms, music practice rooms, a writing lab and a tiered lecture hall, as well as new tennis courts and a track were included in this first phase.

The Renaissance Campaign was organized to finance the second phase which was completed in March 2004. This area encompasses the main entrance and lobby, a chapel with movable seats to accommodate 50 persons, and an auditorium which seats 525. Also included in that phase are storage areas, a dressing room and a TV studio.

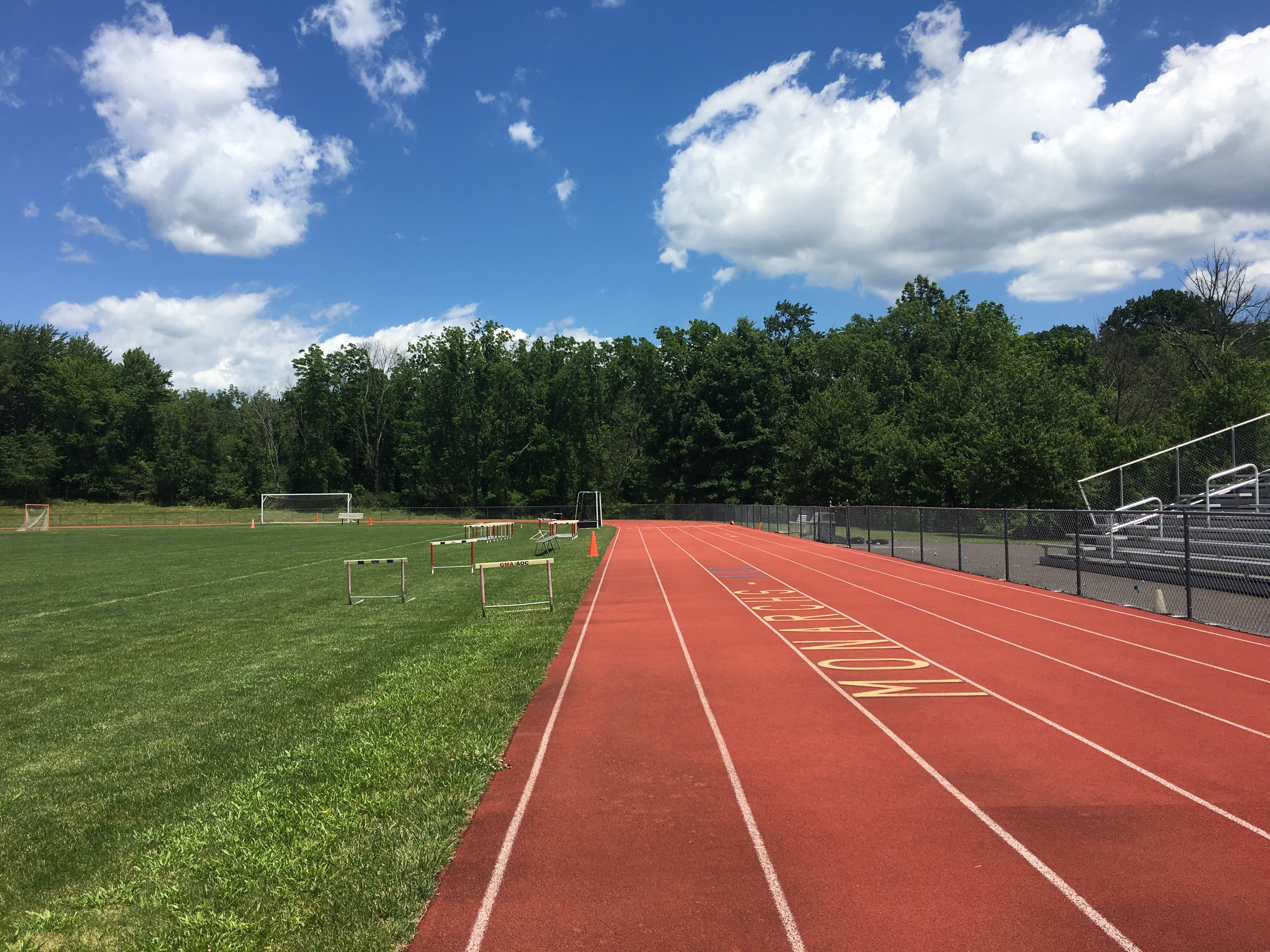
Gwynedd Mercy Academy High School Track

== Notable alumni ==
- Kate M. Harper 1974 - Pennsylvania State Representative

== See also ==
- Gwynedd Mercy Academy Elementary
