= William Claypoole =

American politician

William H. Claypoole

Member of the Pennsylvania House of Representatives from the 61st district
- In office 1969–1970
- Preceded by: District created
- Succeeded by: John B. McCue

Member of the Pennsylvania House of Representatives from the Armstrong County district
- In office 1967–1968

Personal details
- Born: March 7, 1907 Worthington, Pennsylvania
- Died: February 25, 1981 (aged 73) Kittanning, Pennsylvania
- Party: Republican

William H. Claypoole (March 7, 1907 – February 25, 1981) was a Republican member of the Pennsylvania House of Representatives. William "Bill" Claypoole was born in Worthington, Pennsylvania to Charles Claypoole and Anna Elizabeth (Bowser) Claypoole. He was educated in the local schools and was later a resident of Kittanning, Pennsylvania.
