= Joseph Gladeck =

American politician

Joseph M. Gladeck Jr.

Member of the Pennsylvania House of Representatives from the 61st district
- In office January 2, 1979 – November 30, 2000
- Preceded by: Patrick McGinnis
- Succeeded by: Kate M. Harper

Personal details
- Born: August 2, 1950 (age 76) Philadelphia, Pennsylvania
- Party: Republican
- Education: Temple University

Joseph M. Gladeck Jr. (born August 2, 1950) is a former Republican member of the Pennsylvania House of Representatives.

== Formative years ==
Born in Philadelphia, Pennsylvania on August 2, 1950, Gladeck graduated from Wissahickon High School in 1968 and earned his Bachelor of Science degree in political science from Temple University in 1972.

== Political career ==
A Republican, Gladeck was elected to the Pennsylvania House of Representatives in 1978 to represent the 61st legislative district, beginning in 1979. Subsequently reelected for ten additional consecutive terms, he then retired prior to the 2000 election. In 1995, he introduced legislation which would have prohibited teachers from striking in Pennsylvania. In early 1996, he proposed legislation, House Bill 2216, to reform Pennsylvania's workers' compensation system, which was subsequently referred to the House's Labor Relations Committee. in its May 1996 publication, Pennsylvania Medicine, the Pennsylvania Medical Society reported that it was "seeking amendments to this bill." On April 2 of that same year, society members met with Pennsylvania governor Tom Ridge regarding the workers' compensation system; in the May 1996 edition of Pennsylvania Medicine, the society announced that Gladeck's proposed legislation, House Bill 2216, would "serve as the likely vehicle for the governor's reform proposals."
