= Timothy Pesci =

American politician

Member of the Pennsylvania House of Representatives from the 60th district
- In office May 31, 1989 – November 30, 2000
- Preceded by: Henry Livengood
- Succeeded by: Jeff Coleman

Personal details
- Born: June 26, 1944 Freeport, Pennsylvania
- Died: September 28, 2016 (aged 72) Freeport, Pennsylvania
- Party: Democratic
- Spouse: Judy
- Children: Lori Pesci and Rebecca Pesci Ferrier
- Education: Butler County Community College

Timothy L. Pesci (June 26, 1944 – September 28, 2016) was a Democratic member of the Pennsylvania House of Representatives. He represented the 60th legislative district from 1989 to 2000.

== Formative years ==
Born in Freeport, Pennsylvania on June 26, 1944, Pesci graduated from Freeport Area Senior High School in 1962 and earned an A.S. degree in Business Management from Butler County Community College in 1972.

He served in the United States Air Force from 1963 to 1966 during the Vietnam War.

== Public service career ==
Pesci served on the Freeport Borough Council in 1974 and 1975. He then served as controller for Armstrong County, Pennsylvania, from 1976 to 1989.

He was first elected to the Pennsylvania House of Representatives in a special election on May 16, 1989, following the death of Henry Livengood.

In the 2000 election, he was defeated for re-election by twenty-five-year-old Republican Jeff Coleman, in spite of the district being seventy percent Democratic. Bill DeWeese, the House Democratic Leader, said that Pesci had run a "condescending" race against Coleman, calling his opponent "Jeffy" and describing Coleman's campaign volunteers as "the Children from the Corn," referring to the horror film.

Following his defeat, Pesci was signed as a consultant to the Democratic Caucus with a six-month contract worth $30,000. When Pesci's request for an extension was not granted, he unleashed a "volley of four-letter oaths" against DeWeese, who terminated the contract early. In a surprising move, the House Republican Leader, John Perzel, promptly hired Pesci for a three-week contract, which gave Pesci just enough seniority to qualify for a higher state pension.

== Death ==
Pesci died on September 28, 2016, at his home, in Freeport, Pennsylvania.
