= Kate M. Harper =

American politician (born 1956)

Catherine M. Harper
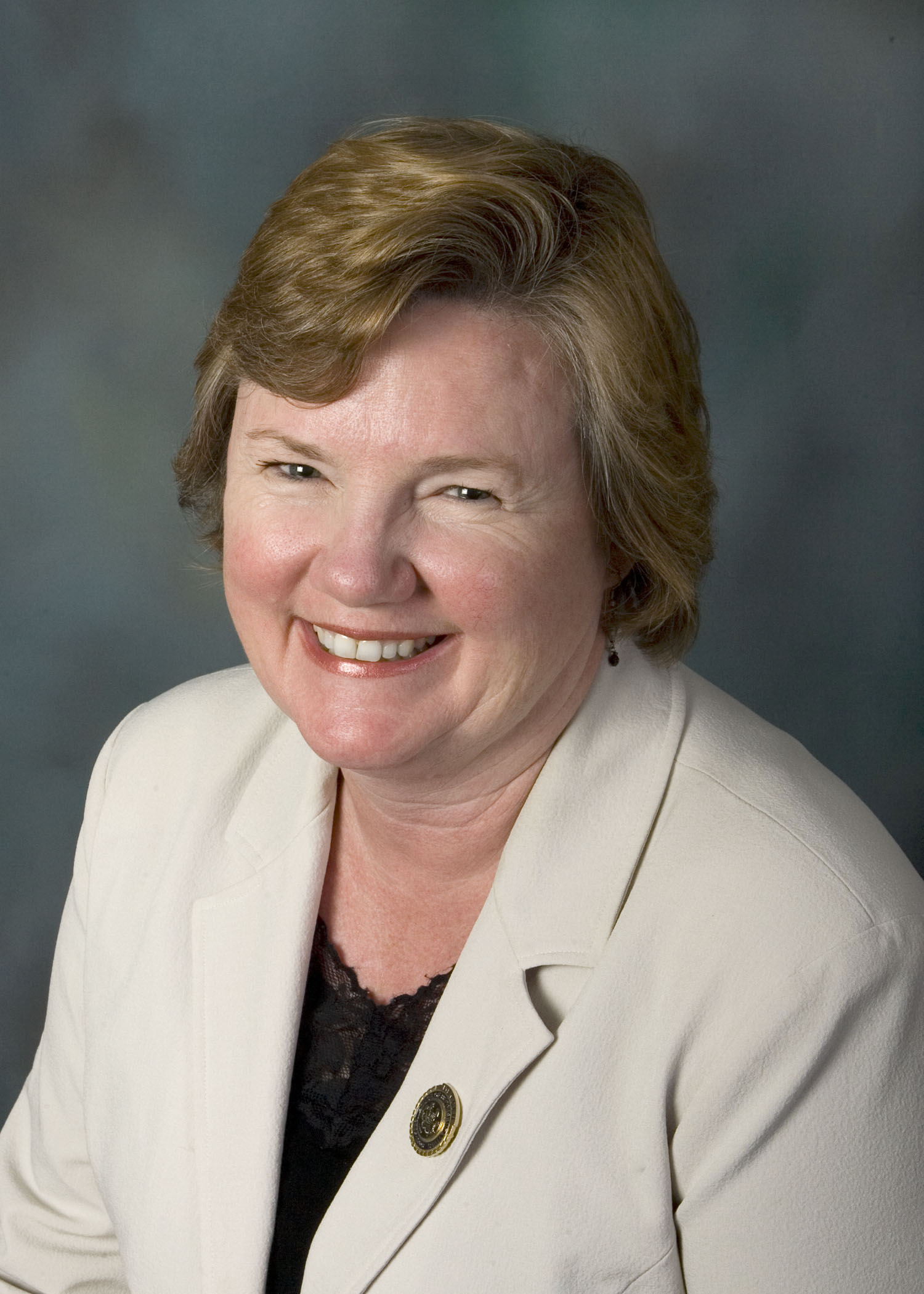
- Catherine M. Harper in 2007

Member of the Pennsylvania House of Representatives from the 61st district
- In office January 2, 2001 – November 30, 2018
- Preceded by: Joseph M. Gladeck, Jr.
- Succeeded by: Liz Hanbidge

Personal details
- Born: April 5, 1956 (age 70) Philadelphia, Pennsylvania
- Party: Republican
- Spouse: Paul J. Kelly III
- Children: Paul Kelly IV, Thomas Kelly
- Education: La Salle University; Villanova University

Catherine M. "Kate" Harper (born April 5, 1956) is an American politician of the Republican Party who formerly represented the 61st Legislative District in the Pennsylvania House of Representatives. Harper was the Chair of the Pennsylvania House of Representatives Local Government Committee and sat on the Transportation Committee.

== Early life and education ==
Kate Harper graduated from Gwynedd Mercy Academy High School, La Salle University, and Villanova University School of Law. She lives in Lower Gwynedd Township and has two children. She is a partner at the law firm of Timoney Knox.

== Political career ==
She was appointed to the Lower Gwynedd Township Planning Commission and was elected township supervisor, where she served as the chairman of the Lower Gwynedd Township Board of Supervisors.

Harper has represented the 61st Legislative District in Montgomery County, Pennsylvania since 2000 and is a member of the Republican Party of Pennsylvania. Harper was the prime architect of the Growing Greener II initiative (Act 1 of 2005), a voter-approved plan to invest $625 million in farmland preservation, open space and parks, and environmental projects.

Harper has also served as Chairman of the:

- House Children and Youth Committee
- House Ethics Committee

She has also served on the Pennsylvania and Delaware Regional Water Committees. Harper has received various awards in her political career.

She was defeated by Democrat Liz Hanbidge in the 2018 General Election after 18 years in office.
