= Liz Hanbidge =

American politician from Pennsylvania

Member of the Pennsylvania House of Representatives from the 61st district
- Incumbent
- Assumed office January 1, 2019
- Preceded by: Kate M. Harper

Personal details
- Party: Democratic
- Education: Foxcroft School; University of Pennsylvania; University of Oxford; Harvard University; University of Wisconsin

Liz Hanbidge is a Democratic member of the Pennsylvania House of Representatives, representing the 61st Legislative District in Montgomery County. The 61st Legislative District includes parts of Whitpain Township, Lower Gwynedd Township and Upper Gwynedd Township, Towamencin Township, and North Wales Borough.

== Early life and education ==
Liz Hanbidge earned a bachelor's degree from University of Pennsylvania as well as graduate degrees in Psychology from University of Oxford and Harvard University. She received her law degree from University of Wisconsin. Prior to joining the state legislature, she practiced law in Montgomery County. Hanbidge also teaches civics to sixth graders at Gwyn-Nor Elementary and East Norriton Middle School, working in conjunction with the local bar association.

== Political career ==
On November 6, 2018, Hanbidge was elected to represent the 61st Legislative District, defeating longtime Republican incumbent Kate Harper. She is the first Democrat to serve the district since its formation in 1969. She currently serves on the Commerce, Agriculture & Rural Affairs, and Local Government committees, and was appointed Montgomery County vice chair of the House Southeast Delegation.

She was endorsed by President Obama and Planned Parenthood PA.

=== Committee assignments ===
- Agriculture & Rural Affairs
- Children & Youth
- Judiciary
- Local Government
