= Patrick McGinnis =

Politician from Pennsylvania

Member of the Pennsylvania House of Representatives from the 61st district
- In office 1973–1978
- Preceded by: John B. McCue
- Succeeded by: Joseph Gladeck

Personal details
- Born: Patrick Joseph McGinnis; March 17, 1927 Philadelphia, Pennsylvania
- Died: November 15, 1990 (aged 63) Bal Harbour, Florida
- Party: Republican

Patrick Joseph McGinnis (March 17, 1927 – November 15, 1990) was a Republican member of the Pennsylvania House of Representatives.
