= John B. McCue =

American politician

Member of the Pennsylvania House of Representatives from the 60th district
- In office 1973–1976
- Preceded by: C. Doyle Steele
- Succeeded by: Henry Livengood

Member of the Pennsylvania House of Representatives from the 61st district
- In office 1971–1972
- Preceded by: William Claypoole
- Succeeded by: Patrick McGinnis

Personal details
- Born: June 22, 1921 Pittsburgh, Pennsylvania
- Died: April 11, 2010 (aged 88) Kittanning, Pennsylvania
- Party: Republican

John B. McCue (June 22, 1921 – April 11, 2010) was a former Republican member of the Pennsylvania House of Representatives.
