= Tim Levcik =

American football player (born 1980)

Profile
- Position: Quarterback

Personal information
- Born: April 27, 1980 (age 46); Ford City, Pennsylvania, U.S.
- Listed height: 6 ft 6 in (1.98 m)
- Listed weight: 238 lb (108 kg)

Career information
- High school: Ford City
- College: Robert Morris
- NFL draft: 2002: undrafted

Career history
- Miami Dolphins (2002)*; Pittsburgh Steelers (2003)*; Philadelphia Soul (2004–2005)
- * Offseason or practice squad member only

Career AFL statistics
- Comp. / Att.: 14 / 38
- Passing yards: 180
- TD–INT: 1–4
- QB rating: 19.52
- Stats at ArenaFan.com

Tim Levcik (born April 27, 1980) is an American former professional football quarterback who played two seasons with the Philadelphia Soul of the Arena Football League (AFL). He played college football at Robert Morris University. He was also a member of the Miami Dolphins and Pittsburgh Steelers of the National Football League (NFL).

== Early life ==
Levcik attended Ford City High School in Ford City, Pennsylvania.

== College career ==
Levcik played for the Robert Morris Colonials from 1998 to 2001. He set career records for 537 completions, 970 attempts, 7,222 passing yards and 76 touchdown passes. His 22 touchdown passes as a senior in 2001 set a record as the single-season school mark. His career high came in a 45–19 victory over the Stony Brook Seawolves on November 3, 2001, when he passed for 363 yards, a total that stood as the single-game record until being broken in 2003. Levcik was also NEC Offensive Player of the Year in 2000 and 2001 as well as the 1998 NEC Offensive Newcomer of the Year. He helped the Colonials to a 26–10 record over his four seasons as the starting quarterback, including a perfect 10–0 record in 2000. He was inducted into the Robert Morris University Athletic Hall of Fame in 2008.

== Professional career ==
Levcik signed with the Miami Dolphins of the NFL on April 24, 2002, after going undrafted in the 2002 NFL draft, becoming the fourth player in Robert Morris history to sign an NFL contract. He was released by the Dolphins on August 23, 2002. He was signed by the NFL's Pittsburgh Steelers on January 14, 2003. Levcik was released by the Steelers on August 22, 2003. He signed with the Philadelphia Soul of the AFL on January 8, 2004. He played for the Soul during the 2004 and 2005 seasons.
