= Drake Log Cabin =

Historic house in Pennsylvania, United States

- U.S. National Register of Historic Places
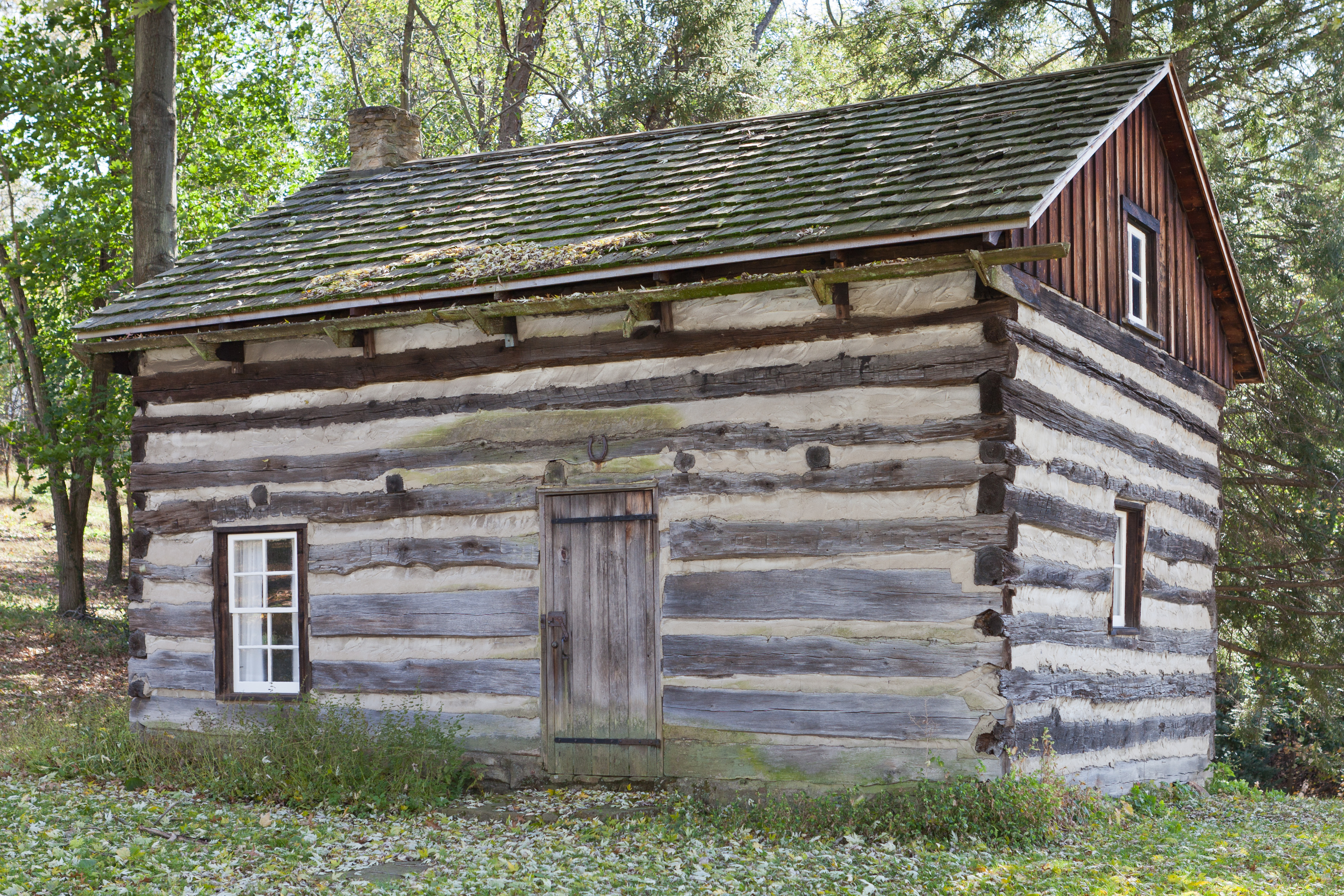

- Location within Pennsylvania Location within the United States
- Interactive map showing the location of Drake Log Cabin
- Location: Williams Alley, Apollo, Pennsylvania
- Coordinates: 40°34′42″N 79°34′0″W
- Area: 0.2 acres (0.081 ha)
- Built: c. 1816
- NRHP reference No.: 83002214
- Added to NRHP: March 3, 1983

Drake Log Cabin is a historic log cabin located at Apollo, Armstrong County, Pennsylvania. It was built about 1816, and is a 1 1/2-story, one-room, rectangular log cabin measuring 18 feet by 22 feet. It has a gable roof and interior end stone chimney. The cabin was restored in 1971 and opened to the public by its owner, the Apollo Area Historical Society.

The Drake Log Cabin was listed on the National Register of Historic Places in 1983.
