= Allegheny Valley Railway =

Allegheny Valley Railroad
Overview
- Parent company: Pennsylvania Railroad (1900–1910)
- Dates of operation: 1892–1910
- Predecessor: Allegheny Valley Railroad
- Successor: Pennsylvania Railroad

Technical
- Track gauge: 1,435 mm (4 ft 8 1/2 in)
- Length: 263.7 miles (424.4 km)

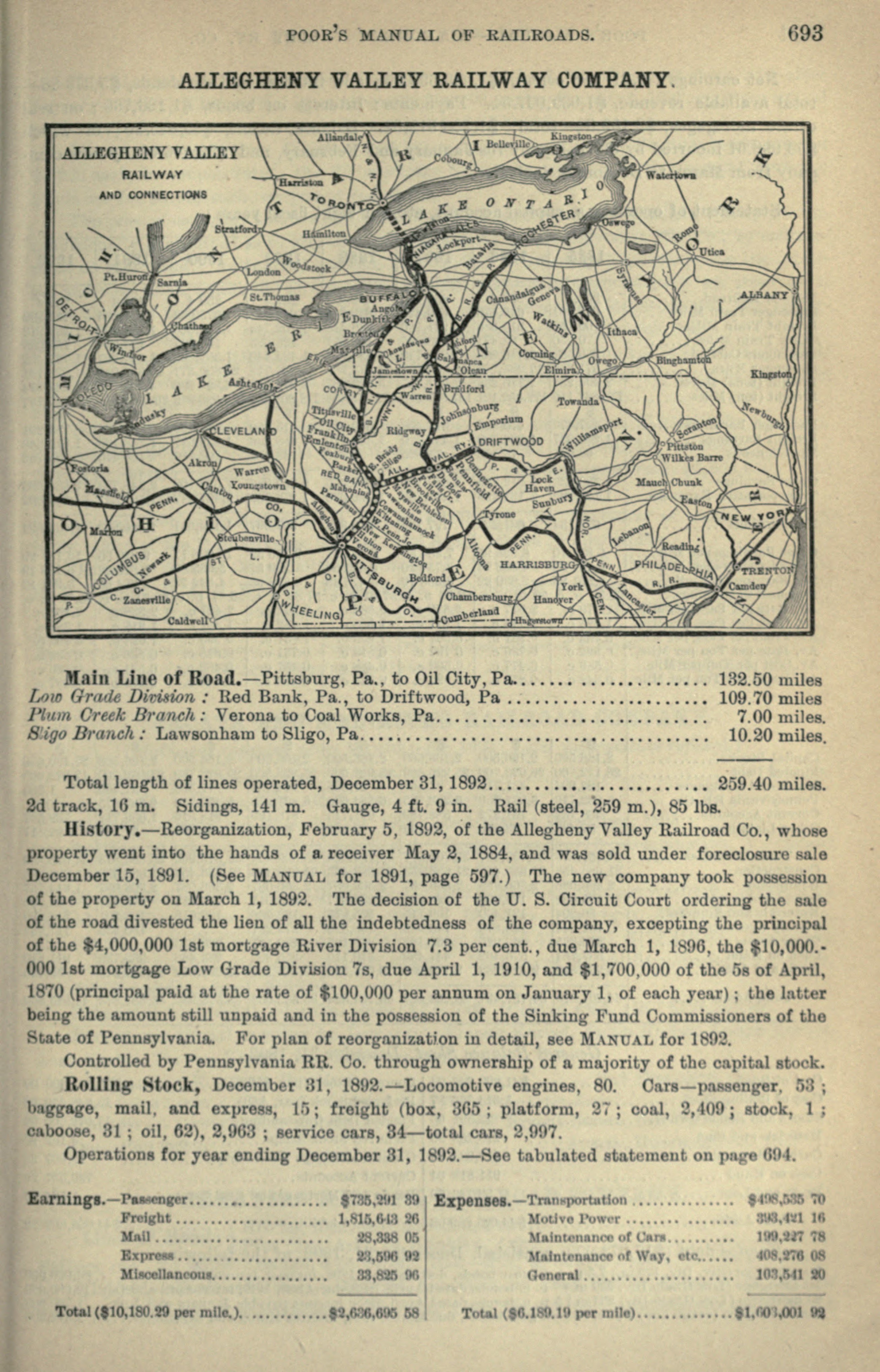

The Allegheny Valley Railway was a railway company in the United States. It was incorporated in 1892 to reorganize the Allegheny Valley Railroad, which had been in receivership since 1884. Its principal lines ran from Pittsburgh, Pennsylvania, to Oil City, Pennsylvania, and Driftwood, Pennsylvania. The Pennsylvania Railroad leased the company in 1900 and merged it in 1910.

== History ==
The Allegheny Valley Railroad built its main line between Pittsburgh and Oil City between 1852 and 1870. A major driving factor in the development of the railroad was access to the oil industry around Titusville. In cooperation with the Pennsylvania Railroad and the Philadelphia and Erie Railroad, the Allegheny Valley Railroad built a second major line between the mouth of Red Bank Creek and Driftwood, Pennsylvania. This line opened in 1874.

The Allegheny Valley Railroad entered receivership on May 2, 1884. The company was reorganized as the Allegheny Valley Railway on February 5, 1892. The Pennsylvania Railroad leased the company on August 1, 1900, and merged it on April 7, 1910. Under the Allegheny Valley Railroad, before and after Pennsylvania control, 48 miles (77 km) of double track were added between Pittsburgh and Oil City. The railroad also constructed or acquired three small branches:

- Brookville Branch, 1.39 miles (2.24 km) in Brookville. Built in 1895.
- Indian Run Branch, 1.2 miles (1.9 km) in New Kensington. Built in 1900.
- Penfield Branch, 1.09 miles (1.75 km) in Penfield. Built by the Penfield Coal Company in 1902 and acquired in 1903.

The Pennsylvania Railroad completed the Brilliant Branch in 1904, leading to several operational changes on the railroad. The branch, running north–south through the East Liberty neighborhood of Pittsburgh, linked the Allegheny Valley Railway's main line with that of the Western Pennsylvania Railroad (to the north) and the Pennsylvania Railroad main line. Passenger trains on the Allegheny Valley Railroad used this route to reach Union Station in Pittsburgh, while freight trains used it as a bypass.
