= Allegheny Valley Railroad (1852–1892) =

Railroad in Pennsylvania

Overview
- Dates of operation: 1852–1892
- Successor: Allegheny Valley Railway

Technical
- Track gauge: 1,435 mm (4 ft 8 1/2 in)
- Length: 259.4 miles (417.5 km)

The Allegheny Valley Railroad was a railway company in the United States. It was incorporated in 1852 and constructed its original line between Pittsburgh, Pennsylvania, and Kittanning, Pennsylvania, between 1853 and 1856. It eventually owned 259.4 route miles (417.5 km), including its main line between Pittsburgh and Oil City, Pennsylvania. The company entered receivership in 1884 and was reorganized as the Allegheny Valley Railway in 1892. That company was leased by the Pennsylvania Railroad in 1900 and merged in 1910.

== History ==
What became the Allegheny Valley Railroad was authorized as the Pittsburg, Kittanning and Warren Railroad on April 4, 1837. Nothing was done until April 14, 1852, when the Pennsylvania General Assembly reauthorized the railroad under the new name. This renewed interest was prompted by the exploitation of oil in the vicinity of Titusville, Pennsylvania, to the north.

The line opened between Pittsburgh, Pennsylvania, and the Kiskiminetas River in 1855. It was further extended to Crooked Creek on December 11, 1855, and Kittanning, Pennsylvania, on January 23, 1856. Financial problems prevented further construction until 1863. Construction continued north, reaching the Mahoning Creek, in April 1866, and Venango City, on January 8, 1868. Venango City sits across the Allegheny River from Oil City, Pennsylvania. The Allegheny Valley Railroad completed a new bridge over the river on February 2, 1870. In Oil City, it connected with the Oil Creek and Allegheny River Railway. The total length of the main line (or "River Division") was 132 miles (212 km).

The Pennsylvania Railroad purchased a stake in the Allegheny Valley Railroad in 1868, and at its urging the railroad undertook the construction of a 110-mile (180 km) "low grade" line between the mouth of Red Bank Creek and Driftwood, Pennsylvania, and a junction with the Philadelphia and Erie Railroad main line. This line was completed on May 4, 1874. The company constructed two other branches. The first, the 7-mile (11 km) Plum Creek Branch, was completed between Verona, Pennsylvania, and Plum, Pennsylvania, in October 1872. The second, the 10-mile (16 km) Sligo Branch, was completed between Lawsonham, Pennsylvania, and Sligo, Pennsylvania, in 1874.

The Allegheny Valley Railroad entered receivership on May 2, 1884. It was reorganized as the Allegheny Valley Railway on January 21, 1892. The Pennsylvania Railroad leased that company in 1900 and merged it in 1910.
