= Kosciusko and Southwestern Railway =

Overview
- Headquarters: Water Valley, MS
- Reporting mark: KSRY
- Locale: Mississippi
- Dates of operation: 1998–2014
- Predecessor: Illinois Central Railroad

Technical
- Track gauge: 4 ft 8 1/2 in (1,435 mm) standard gauge
- Length: 21.66 miles

The Kosciusko and Southwestern Railway (reporting mark KSRY) was formed in 1998 to operate in the former Aberdeen District of the Illinois Central Railroad between Aberdeen Junction and Munsons Crossing, Mississippi. The 21.66 mile railroad line was purchased from the Illinois Central Railroad by the Mississippi Department of Transportation and leased to the Kosciusko & Southwestern Railway.

The company once specialized in transporting wood products from local woodyards, but after 2005 existed entirely by storing surplus freight cars for large leasing companies. The railroad interchanged with Canadian National, and later with Grenada Railway at Aberdeen Junction.

On July 28, 2011, Grenada Railway filed an embargo due to a bridge problem, which took a portion of their line out of service. This embargo, which included the part of their line which connected to KSRY, meant that no traffic would be accepted to or from points within that section. On September 20, 2011, Grenada Railway filed a formal petition to abandon that segment which included the KSRY interchange. That petition was later withdrawn, but the embargo remains in effect as of early 2013.

With no rail service available to move cars in or out, KSRY was essentially a railroad to nowhere. Although KSRY was actively working with three prospective shippers in Kosciusko at the time of the embargo, any such efforts were rendered useless as long as the connecting line was not in service.

Planned repairs to two KSRY bridges were put on hold. Maintenance efforts were reduced to vegetation control in specific areas. The remaining freight cars stored on the line were sold by the owner, removed from the railroad by a contractor in early 2014, and scrapped. With no revenue and no foreseeable prospect for resumption of service on the Grenada Railway line which connected KSRY to the rest of the nation's rail system, the contract with the state was terminated and the company filed for dissolution.

As of late 2014, the portion of Grenada Railway which connects to the former KSRY remains out of service. The state still owns the former KSRY line. There has been a suggestion that the rails be removed and a hiking trail be created along the right of way. It is also possible that a new operator could resume service at some point in the future.

== Motive Power ==
The KSRY had three small locomotives:

- 1 GE 25-ton switcher (no number)
- 1 GE 45-ton switcher (KSRY 503)

Both were sold to North Mississippi Rail Services and trucked from the property.

A third locomotive, *1 Plymouth Locomotive Works 12-ton switcher (KSRY 202) was privately owned and is also no longer on the property.
