= Red Bank Creek =

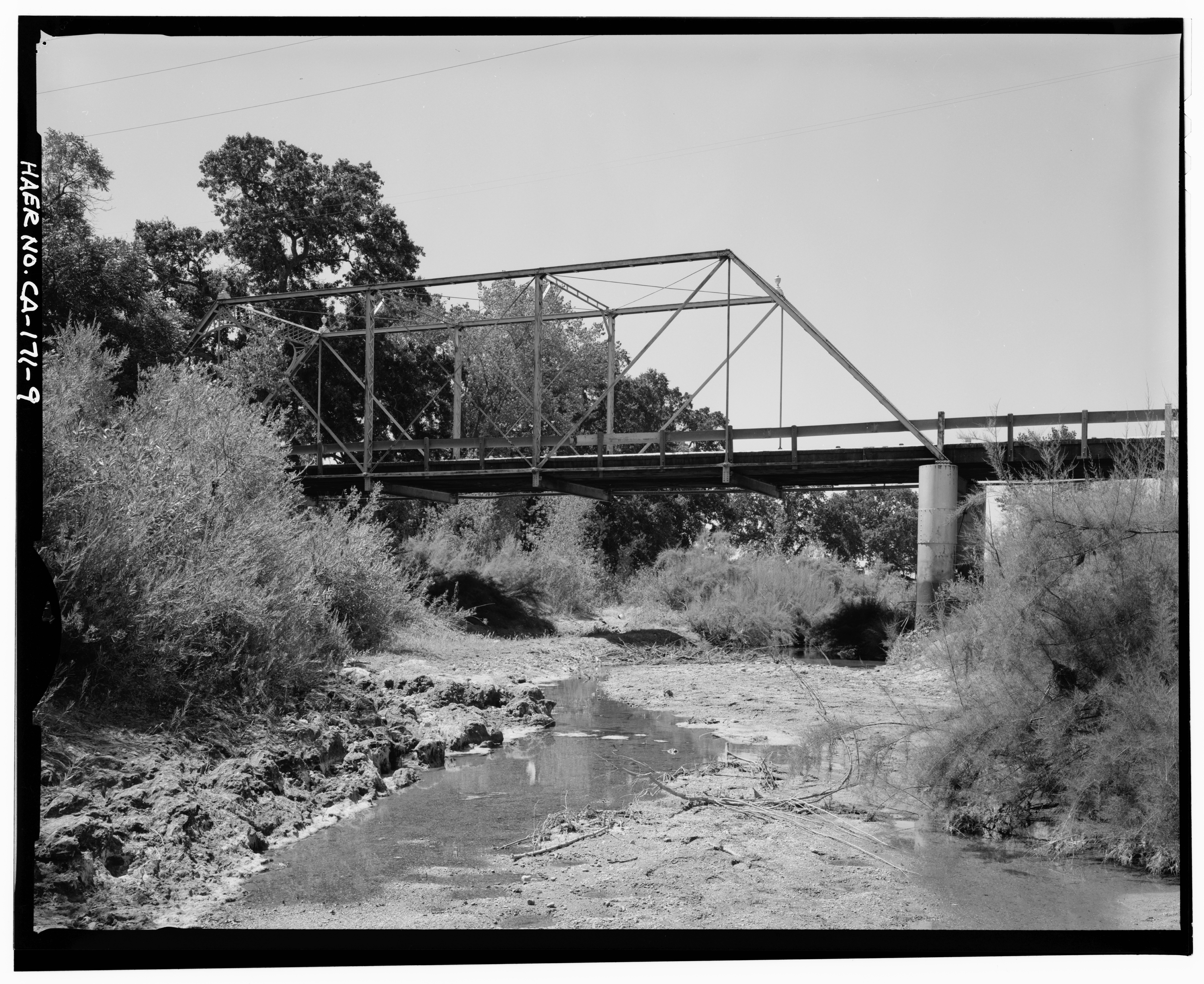
- Old Red Bank Creek Bridge at Red Bluff

- Location of Red Bank Creek in California

Location
- Country: United States
- State: California
- Cities: Red Bank, Red Bluff

Physical characteristics
- Source: California Coast Ranges
  - coordinates: 40°03′44″N 122°44′01″W
  - elevation: 5,201 ft (1,585 m)
- Mouth: Sacramento River
  - coordinates: 40°09′10″N 122°12′19″W
  - elevation: 256 ft (78 m)
- Length: 39 mi (63 km)
- Basin size: 116.3 sq mi (301 km^{2})
- Discharge
  - location: near Red Bluff
  - average: 49 cu ft/s (1.4 m^{3}/s)
  - minimum: 0 cu ft/s (0 m^{3}/s)
  - maximum: 9,730 cu ft/s (276 m^{3}/s)

Red Bank Creek is a major stream in Tehama County, California, and a tributary of the Sacramento River. About 39 miles (63 km) long, it originates in the foothills of the Coast Ranges, near the boundary of the Mendocino National Forest, and flows east across the Sacramento Valley to join the Sacramento River near Red Bluff. Red Bank Creek, like the other streams draining this part of the western Sacramento Valley, is a highly seasonal stream that flows only during the winter and spring.

Old Red Bank Creek Bridge at Red Bluff was built by the Pacific Bridge Company in 1894. According to a 1983 news article about a hazardous chemical spill into the creek following a 38-car railroad derailment stated "Red Bank Creek curls around the sprawling Diamond International lumber mill before emptying into the Sacramento River just above the Red Bluff Diversion Dam, where water is sent into the Tehama and Colusa canals".

The creek was named for the reddish character of its clay banks. The creek has also been known as Red Bluff Creek, Redbank Creek and Baranca Colorada (Spanish for "red canyon").

== History ==
According to research by C. Hart Merriam (published by UC Berkeley) the Wi-e'-ker'-ril band of the Wintun people lived along Red Bank Creek. Earlier writers described these people as the "Wylacker and Noemuc," or Northern Wintoon.

In 1863 there was a California militia training camp along Red Bank Creek called Camp Ellis. The camp was disbanded on November 4 and "the Companies marched into Red Bluff and dismissed".

As of 1887, Albert Gallatin owned a 64,000 acre ranch sited between Red Bank Creek and Thomes Creek. As of 1888 he reportedly owned 80,000 acres and was trying to induce his "old friend" Collis P. Huntington to open a railway route from Red Bluff through his land along Red Bank though Yolla Bolly–Middle Eel Wilderness area to Humboldt Bay; a competing proposed route was from Red Bluff through the Cottonwood district along Cottonwood Creek.

== Ecology ==
Fish of Red Bank Creek include California roach, rainbow trout, Sacramento perch, Sacramento pikeminnow, Sacramento splittail, Sacramento sucker, speckled dace, and others.

== See also ==
- List of rivers of California
