= North Apollo, Pennsylvania =

Borough in Pennsylvania, US

- Borough
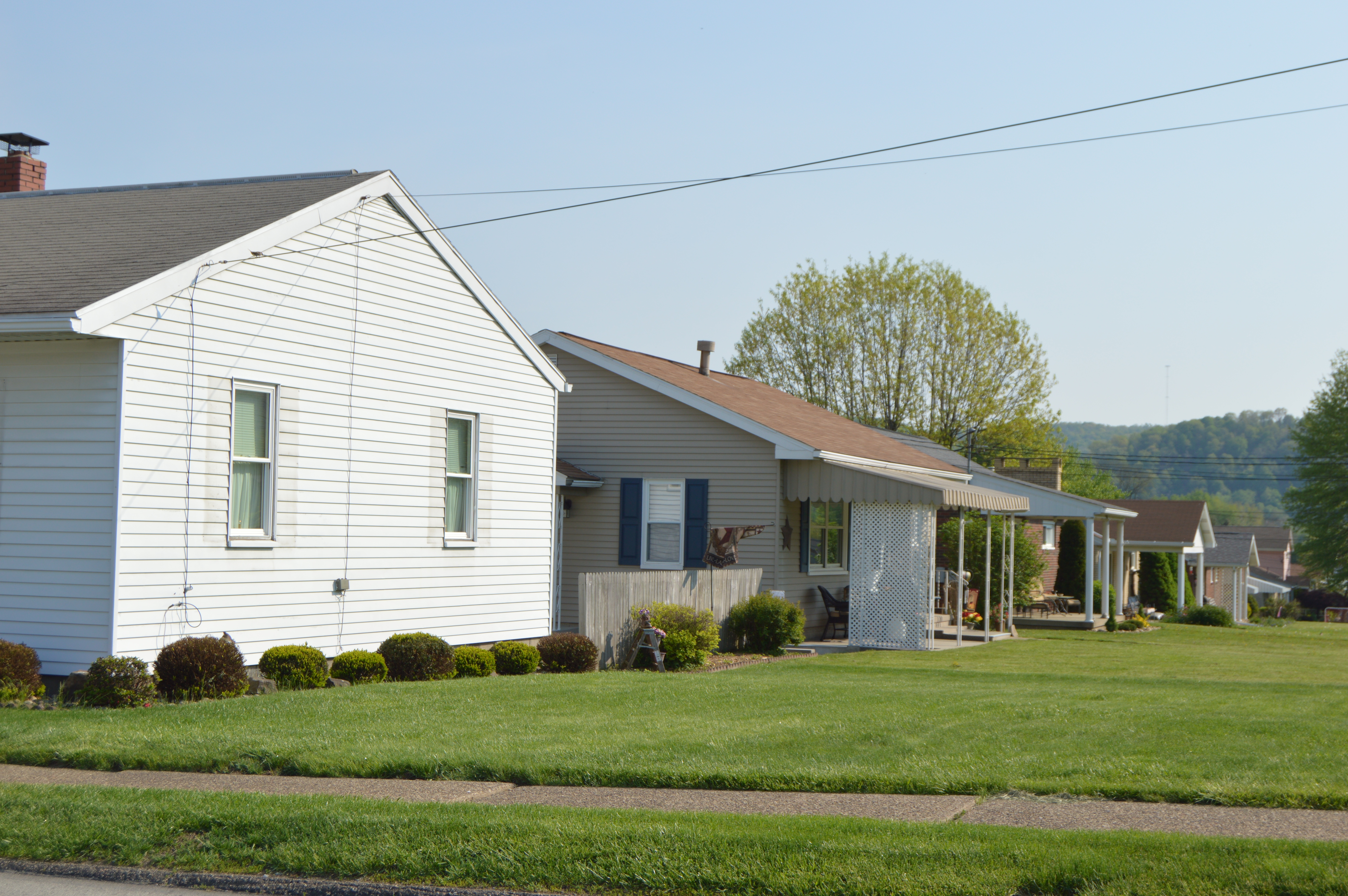
- Houses on Acheson Avenue

- Location of North Apollo in Armstrong County, Pennsylvania.

- Location within Pennsylvania
- Coordinates: 40°35′36″N 79°33′28″W
- Country: United States
- State: Pennsylvania
- County: Armstrong

Government
  - Type: Borough Council

Area
  - Total: 0.60 sq mi (1.55 km^{2})
  - Land: 0.54 sq mi (1.41 km^{2})
  - Water: 0.054 sq mi (0.14 km^{2})
- Elevation: 810 ft (250 m)

Population (2020)
  - Total: 1,252
  - Density: 2,304.0/sq mi (889.58/km^{2})
- Time zone: UTC-5 (Eastern (EST))
  - Summer (DST): UTC-4 (EDT)
- Zip code: 15673
- FIPS code: 42-54728
- Website: northapolloborough.com

North Apollo is a borough in Armstrong County, Pennsylvania, United States. The population was 1,252 at the 2020 census.

== Geography ==
North Apollo is located along the Kiskiminetas River in southern Armstrong County at 40°35′36″N 79°33′28″W (40.593301, −79.557793). It is bordered by the borough of Apollo to the south and by the borough of East Vandergrift across the river to the west.

According to the United States Census Bureau, the borough has a total area of 0.62 square miles (1.6 km^{2}), of which 0.54 square miles (1.4 km^{2}) is land and 0.039 square miles (0.1 km^{2}), or 9.22%, is water.

== Demographics ==
Historical population
Census	Pop.	Note	%±
1930	1,485		—
1940	1,568		5.6%
1950	1,502		−4.2%
1960	1,741		15.9%
1970	1,618		−7.1%
1980	1,487		−8.1%
1990	1,391		−6.5%
2000	1,426		2.5%
2010	1,297		−9.0%
2020	1,252		−3.5%

As of the 2000 census, there were 1,426 people, 583 households, and 430 families residing in the borough. The population density was 2,662.3 inhabitants per square mile (1,027.9/km^{2}). There were 626 housing units at an average density of 1,168.7 per square mile (451.2/km^{2}). The racial makeup of the borough was 97.19% White, 1.54% African American, 0.14% Native American, 0.14% Asian, 0.07% Pacific Islander, 0.28% from other races, and 0.63% from two or more races. Hispanic or Latino of any race were 0.14% of the population.

There were 583 households, out of which 31.9% had children under the age of 18 living with them, 57.1% were married couples living together, 12.9% had a female householder with no husband present, and 26.2% were non-families. 24.0% of all households were made up of individuals, and 15.3% had someone living alone who was 65 years of age or older. The average household size was 2.45 and the average family size was 2.89.

The borough median age of 41 years was slightly more than the county median age of 40 years. The distribution by age group was 24.3% under the age of 18, 6.7% from 18 to 24, 27.8% from 25 to 44, 21.9% from 45 to 64, and 19.4% who were 65 years of age or older. The median age was 41 years. For every 100 females there were 92.7 males. For every 100 females age 18 and over, there were 86.5 males.

The median income for a household in the borough was $30,417, and the median income for a family was $35,789. Males had a median income of $31,905 versus $20,333 for females. The per capita income for the borough was $14,025. About 12.1% of families and 13.5% of the population were below the poverty line, including 21.8% of those under age 18 and 7.6% of those age 65 or over.
