= Ford City, Pennsylvania =

Borough in Pennsylvania, US

- Borough
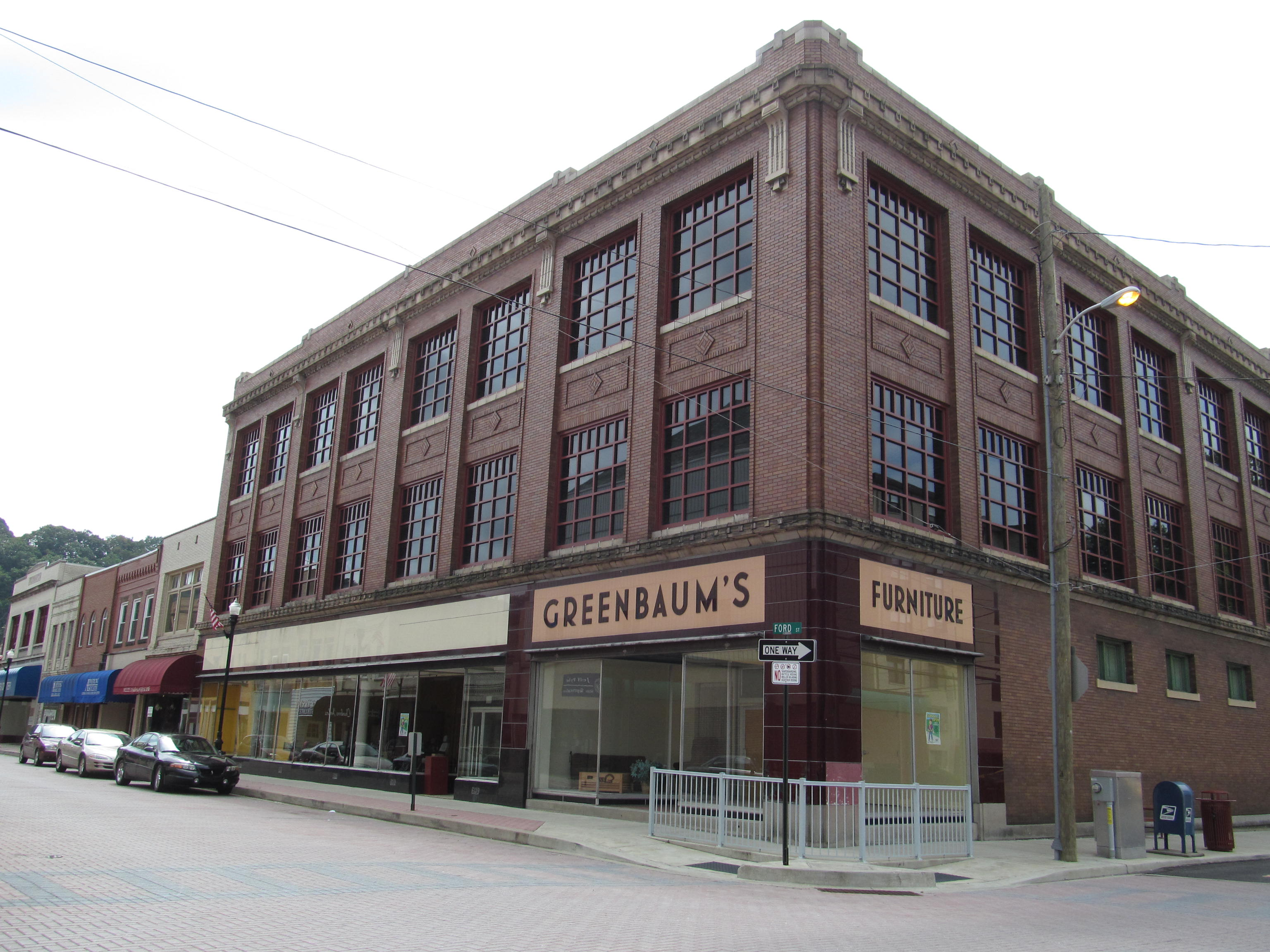
- Downtown Ford City

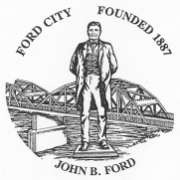
- Seal
- Motto(s): A Great Place to Work and Live
- Location of Ford City in Armstrong County, Pennsylvania.

- Location within Pennsylvania
- Coordinates: 40°46′17″N 79°31′48″W
- Country: United States
- State: Pennsylvania
- County: Armstrong
- Settled: 1887
- Incorporated: 1889

Government
  - Type: Council-Mayor
  - Mayor: Timothy Bureau

Area
  - Total: 0.76 sq mi (1.97 km^{2})
  - Land: 0.64 sq mi (1.67 km^{2})
  - Water: 0.12 sq mi (0.30 km^{2})
- Elevation: 794 ft (242 m)

Population (2020)
  - Total: 2,859
  - Density: 4,435.4/sq mi (1,712.51/km^{2})
- Time zone: UTC-5 (Eastern (EST))
  - Summer (DST): UTC-4 (EDT)
- Zip code: 16226
- Area codes: 724, 878
- FIPS code: 42-26512
- Website: www.fordcityborough.org

Ford City is a borough in Armstrong County, Pennsylvania, United States, 40 miles (64 km) northeast of Pittsburgh along the east bank of the Allegheny River and 4 miles (6 km) south of Kittanning, the county seat. The population was 2,859 at the 2020 census. It is part of the Pittsburgh metropolitan area.

== History ==
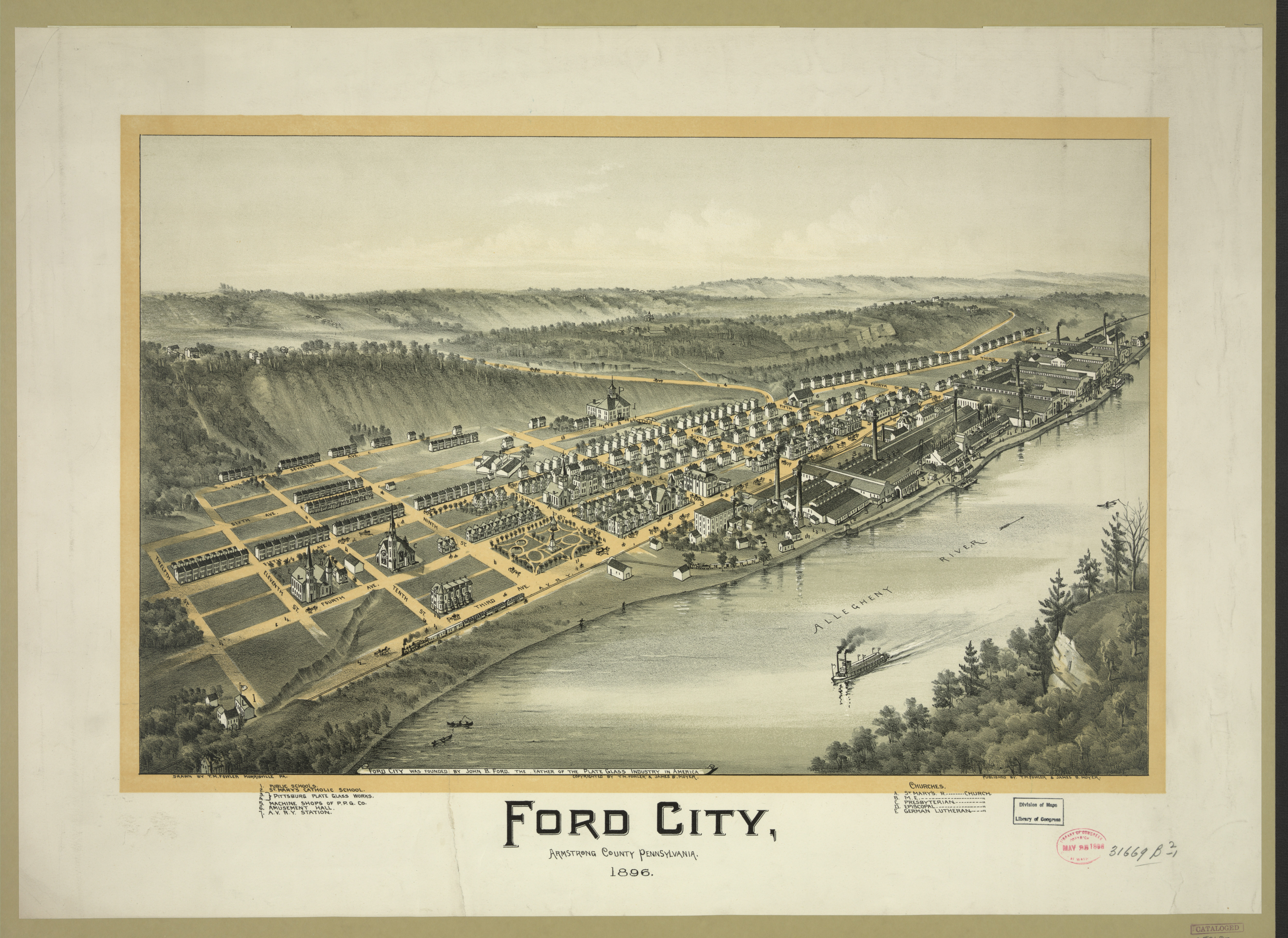
Ford City in 1896

=== Founding ===
Ford City came into being from the plans of Captain John B. Ford (1811-1903), an industrialist interested in establishing a plate-glass industry. In prior endeavors, Ford had owned and operated, among many things, a river shipping line from which he drew his capital. The site upon which Ford City is located consisted roughly 460 acres broken primarily into three farms owned by Ross, Spencer and Graff families.

Ford’s explorations of the area prior to his land acquisitions had discovered the Allegheny River offered a unique asset in its composition. Besides the obvious advantage of low-cost shipping, the Allegheny River is a gravel-bottom river. Characteristics of this type of river were massive deposits of glacial sand, an essential element in the manufacture of glass. Also discovered in the area were huge deposits of natural gas, the fuel source required to fire the immense kilns used to melt the glass’s elements. Having secured his resources, all that Ford required to begin his venture was a very large labor force.

As legends tell, Ford sent agents to glassmaking towns all across Europe. From existing European glass enterprises, his agents quietly recruited experienced glassworkers. Offering a fair day’s wage and affordable housing, Ford’s agents were highly successful in getting the workers Ford needed. They were so successful that some towns in Europe were left nearly emptied of male adult glassworkers. An excellent example of this took place in Stolberg, Germany from which Ford recruited a large number of Ford City’s first glass-working immigrants. From Ireland and France, Ford lured away men experienced in the supervision of glassworks. The early recruited foreman was offered an excellent wage and the promise of a house with marble-mantled fireplaces. These early workers also brought with them their various faiths in God, which manifested in many different Catholic churches of Ford City, including Holy Trinity Roman Catholic Church; Christ Prince of Peace; and St. Francis DePaul.

=== Early history ===
On July 1st, 1898, Ford City submitted its charter, which was approved September 21st, 1898. Previously part of Manor Township, Ford City Borough became one of the fastest-growing boroughs in the United States, gaining over 3,000 in population in only 10 years. Drawing workers and their families from over 35 identifiable European ethnic groups, Ford City became the quintessential example of America’s melting pot. Uniquely, Ford City never experienced racial or ethnic strife- Ford’s glass factory made all men equal. Through the early 20th century, Ford’s company, Pittsburgh Plate Glass Company (now PPG Industries), became the leading manufacturer of glass in the entire world. Producing a better type of glass at a lesser price than its European competitors. PPG’s efficiency and product quality virtually ended the importation of European glass to the United States. As demand increased, the need for more laborers in the Ford City Works factory also increased. The town grew daily.

Through the early part of the 20th century, Ford City prospered. It touched every skyscraper of the United States in the glass that formed the exteriors of the magnificent structures. The common bond was found in the changing of the shifts at PPG and at the Friday-night basketball games. Ford City High School basketball seems to have benefitted the town. Winning the section title was an annual event, and the teams amassed a Western Pennsylvania Interscholastic Athletic League (WPIAL) record 34 section titles. It used to be said that every garage in every alley in Ford City had a basketball hoop attached to it. Boulder Park became a mecca of summer league basketball, drawing teams from as far away as Pittsburgh and New Castle.

In the early 1970’s, manufacturing changes at PPG caused a relocation of many of the town’s workers. This trend continued for 20 years, with the workforce gradually being reduced or transferred to PPG’s other plants. Finally, in 1992, PPG permanently closed its gates and began the demolition of portions of the Ford City Works, formerly the largest plate-glass factory in the world. As its peak, PPG employed over 4,000 workers. Its loss to Ford City was profound and deeply felt. To this day, the number of pensioned workers from PPG Ford City Works is greater than the total workforces of many of PPG’s existing operating facilities. The loss of PPG was economically devastating to the town. In 1987 Natures Blend moved to a portion of the former factory. In 1989 it began manufacturing cabinet doors, drawer fronts, and framing for some of the area’s largest housing builders. By 1999, Nature’s Blend had grown in sales and product offerings, necessitating expansion. They doubled their production floor space to over 80,000 sq. ft. and invested in additional equipment. This expansion provided them with the means to process hardwoods from kiln-dried state to finished product, ready to install.

In 1989, KPM, founded by Sam Kube and Albert Plekker in Greensburg, Pennsylvania in 1983, moved into the new company headquarters in Ford City, Pennsylvania in a small portion of the former plant. The presidents decide to specialize in the modernization of roll grinders in 1990. In 1999, KPM became part of the Herkules Group providing employment opportunities within the Borough. Dallas-based Eljer had operated a facility in Ford City since 1918 when the company acquired a former pottery plant from PPG Industries and Ford City founder John B. Ford. The name "Eljer" was formed by founders Raymond Elmer Crane and Elmer Jerome Bacchus putting together the first few letters of their middle names. Today, American Standard, which merged with the well-known plumbing brands Eljer and Crane, is owned primarily by private equity firm Sun Capital Partners, with private equity firm Bain Capital Partners Inc. holding a minority share.

The Ford City plant had a long manufacturing history, but in prior years to its closing its work force had gradually decreased. About 20 years before, the plant employed around 700. By 2003, employment had fallen to 500, then to 300 in 2004. By early 2007, employment had fallen another 140. However, the Borough's situation worsened with the shutdown of the plant in 2008, further impacting local employment.

=== Recent History ===
In more recent history, Ford City has attempted recovery from its economic collapse. In 2004, Ford City Community Development Corporation secured $12 million in funds to construct a 70,000-square-foot business incubator on the site of the former Pittsburgh Plate Glass (PPG) factory. This initiative was part of the town’s broader revitalization efforts aimed at attracting new businesses and creating job opportunities. The project was designed to help stimulate economic growth and provide a space for startups and small businesses to thrive.

The Community Development Corporation attracted as tenants a high-tech manufacturing company, Caracal, and a window-shade company, OEM Shades. But Caracal, which was fairly new, began experiencing financial problems and had trouble paying its rent. Without that income, the community-development corporation went bankrupt in 2008; Caracal followed in 2009, the same year the borough was forced to foreclose on the property. This led to the Borough being given a $580,000 fine by the U.S. Economic Development Administration for foreclosing on the property too soon, violating the EDA grant. This was soon after settled in 2016 when Borough Council authorized a $116,000 payment to the Economic Development Authority, paying the fine originally levied in 2015 and eliminating any connection to the business-incubator project. In a turn of the tide, Belleflex Technologies, a wholly owned subsidiary of Blair Strip Steel Company and manufacture of Bellville Springs and other custom steel products, renovated and occupies a portion of the former PPG Plant used for the business incubator. In addition to their occupation, a second subsidiary PullFlex Technologies, an "American producer of Fiberglass Reinforced Polymers focusing on specialty and custom designed applications like high strength-to-weight ratio composite materials, hybrid resin systems and custom woven and stitched material solutions" renovated and now occupies an additional portion of the plant.

=== Future Developments ===
Moving forward, the Borough is expected to see development of the former PPG Brownfields in the Southern portion of town. In 2021, Borough Council voted to approve and authorize borough officials to execute an option agreement with the Armstrong County Industrial Development Council for a 120-day term and $1,000 consideration related to 30 acres of real property owned by the borough located along 2nd Avenue at the southern end of the borough adjacent to the river. Soon after, a 10-acre portion was sold to Belleflex Technologies which neighbors the property. Additionally, a 20-acre portion was sold to Projectile Tube Cleaning Inc. of Manor Township. These businesses are expected to develop the currently vacant land bringing economic opportunities to the Borough. The Northern Brownfields are privately owned, with hopes of future development.

== Geography ==
Ford City is located at 40°46′17″N 79°31′48″W (40.771410, −79.529906).

According to the United States Census Bureau, the borough has a total area of 0.77 square miles (2.0 km^{2}), of which 0.66 square miles (1.7 km^{2}) is land and 0.12 square miles (0.3 km^{2}), or 15.28%, is water.

=== Climate ===
Climate data for Ford City 4S Dam, Pennsylvania (1991–2020 normals, extremes 1943–present)
Month	Jan	Feb	Mar	Apr	May	Jun	Jul	Aug	Sep	Oct	Nov	Dec	Year
Record high °F (°C)	76 (24)	77 (25)	87 (31)	91 (33)	96 (36)	99 (37)	104 (40)	98 (37)	98 (37)	91 (33)	83 (28)	75 (24)	104 (40)
Mean daily maximum °F (°C)	35.7 (2.1)	38.8 (3.8)	48.4 (9.1)	62.2 (16.8)	72.0 (22.2)	79.6 (26.4)	83.8 (28.8)	82.5 (28.1)	75.8 (24.3)	63.7 (17.6)	50.9 (10.5)	39.8 (4.3)	61.1 (16.2)
Daily mean °F (°C)	26.4 (−3.1)	28.4 (−2.0)	36.9 (2.7)	48.7 (9.3)	59.0 (15.0)	67.5 (19.7)	71.6 (22.0)	70.3 (21.3)	63.2 (17.3)	51.5 (10.8)	40.4 (4.7)	31.4 (−0.3)	49.6 (9.8)
Mean daily minimum °F (°C)	17.2 (−8.2)	18.1 (−7.7)	25.5 (−3.6)	35.1 (1.7)	46.0 (7.8)	55.4 (13.0)	59.4 (15.2)	58.0 (14.4)	50.5 (10.3)	39.3 (4.1)	29.9 (−1.2)	22.9 (−5.1)	38.1 (3.4)
Record low °F (°C)	−29 (−34)	−23 (−31)	−12 (−24)	10 (−12)	21 (−6)	32 (0)	32 (0)	36 (2)	27 (−3)	16 (−9)	4 (−16)	−19 (−28)	−29 (−34)
Average precipitation inches (mm)	3.20 (81)	2.61 (66)	3.25 (83)	3.66 (93)	3.99 (101)	4.69 (119)	4.45 (113)	4.22 (107)	4.22 (107)	3.34 (85)	3.31 (84)	3.38 (86)	44.32 (1,126)
Average precipitation days (≥ 0.01 in)	17.0	13.8	13.6	14.7	14.5	13.0	11.9	10.9	11.3	13.0	13.6	15.4	162.7
Source: NOAA

== Demographics ==
Historical population
Census	Pop.	Note	%±
1890	1,255		—
1900	2,870		128.7%
1910	4,850		69.0%
1920	5,605		15.6%
1930	6,127		9.3%
1940	5,795		−5.4%
1950	5,352		−7.6%
1960	5,440		1.6%
1970	4,749		−12.7%
1980	3,923		−17.4%
1990	3,413		−13.0%
2000	3,451		1.1%
2010	2,991		−13.3%
2020	2,859		−4.4%

According to the 2020 U.S. census and American Community Survey data, Ford City Borough had a population of 2,859 people, residing in 1,373 households. The population skews older, with a median age of 43.2 years. Approximately 21% of residents were under the age of 18, while 20% were 65 or older, reflecting a significant senior population. The gender split was nearly even, with 50.3% female and 49.7% male. Racially, the community was predominantly White at 92.6%, followed by 2.1% African American, 0.2% Native American, and 4.1% identifying as two or more races. Less than 1% of the population identified as Hispanic or Latino of any race.

There were 1,599 housing units, with 67.8% owner-occupied and the remaining 32.2% renter-occupied. The median gross rent was a modest $185, and the median home value was $83,000. The average household size was 2.06, and the average family size was 2.78. Economically, the median household income was $54,457, while families earned a median of $75,505. About 13.6% of all residents lived below the poverty line, including 2.2% of children under 18 and 21.3% of those 65 and older.

Education levels showed that 86% of adults age 25 and older had at least a high school diploma, but only 14% held a bachelor’s degree or higher, which is below the state and national averages. Of the 2,375 residents aged 16 and over, 57% were in the labor force—comprising 1,294 employed individuals and 58 unemployed—while 43% were not in the labor force, including many retirees. The dominant employment sectors included health care, manufacturing, and retail.

== Education ==
A part of the public Armstrong School District, Ford City has an elementary school and, in the past, had its own high school, Ford City Junior/Senior High School. Currently, students in Ford City attend Lenape Elementary from kindergarten through sixth grade, and then Armstrong Junior/Senior High School in Manor Township from grades seven through twelve. Alternatively, students can attend Lenape Vocational Technical School beginning their junior year The town's high school, Ford City Junior/Senior High School, included grades seven through twelve. FCHS opened its doors in 1909, awarding diplomas to its first graduating class of 4 students on May 10, 1910, and had its final graduating class in June 2015.

Soon after its closing, Ford City Junior/Senior High School was demolished, making way for the move of BC3 @ Armstrong onto its site. In 2022, the State Rep. Jeffery P. Pyle Building was opened housing BC3 and in it providing classes that lead to an associate degree in Business Administration, Psychology and General Studies.

The area's only Catholic elementary school, Divine Redeemer, is located on 4th Avenue in downtown Ford City.

== Parks and recreation ==
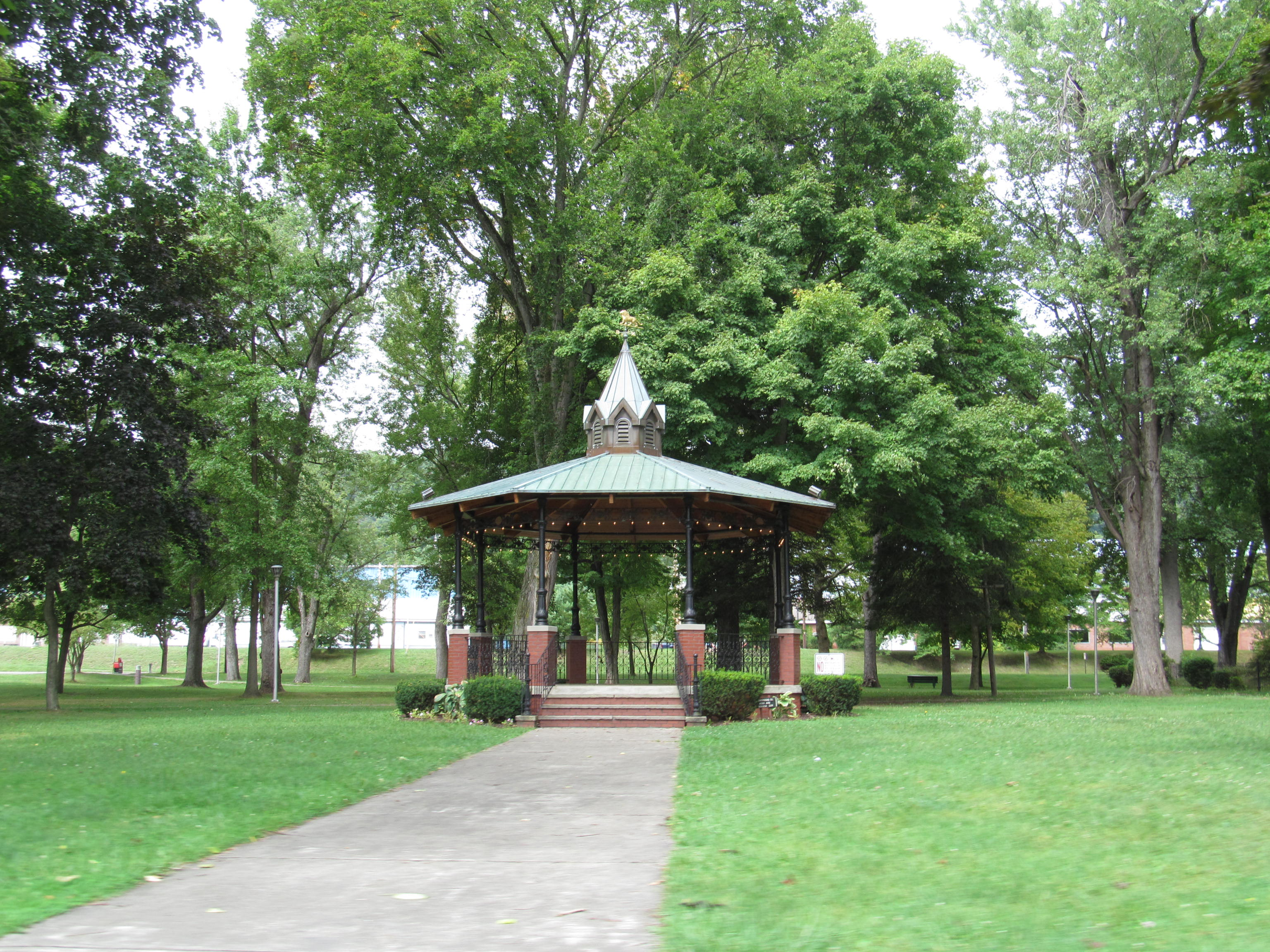
Ford City Memorial Park

Ford City Memorial Park, located on 4th Avenue between 8th and 9th Streets, features an 1891 bronze statue of John B. Ford, by Hartford, Connecticut sculptor Carl Conrads. The park also features a gazebo and a war memorial dedicated to the men and women of Ford City who served in the United States military. The 7th Avenue Playground, located at the northern end of 7th Avenue between 12th and 13th Streets, was upgraded with new playground equipment in 2017. The playground features a covered pavilion, new playground equipment and a large field equipped with a baseball backstop. Boulder Park, located at the southern end of 6th Avenue between 5th and 6th Streets, was also upgraded with new playground equipment in 2017. The park features a full-court lighted basketball court, a covered pavilion and new playground equipment. It was announced in early 2018 that the basketball court would be completely renovated, allowing for the addition of deck hockey to be played on the court.

The 49-mile-long Armstrong Trail is located on the former Allegheny Valley Railroad line along the eastern bank of the Allegheny River in Armstrong & Clarion Counties. Nearly two miles of the trail traverses through the Borough, with a small spur to the riverfront on the Southern end of town. The trail links Leechburg, Schenley, Ford City, Kittanning and East Brady as well as many other communities.

== Notable people ==
- Arda Bowser, NFL football player
- David Coulter, banker
- Gus Frerotte, NFL quarterback
- Raymond Harvey, Medal of Honor recipient
- John F. Hunter, Ohio congressman
- Tim Levcik, American football player
- Abby Major, member of the Pennsylvania House of Representatives
- Zigmund "Red" Mihalik, Hall of Fame basketball official
- Albert Pechan, Pennsylvania state senator
- Chris Valasek, computer security expert
- Michael Yates, economist and magazine editor

== See also ==
- List of crossings of the Allegheny River
