= Apollo, Pennsylvania =

Borough in Pennsylvania, US

- Borough
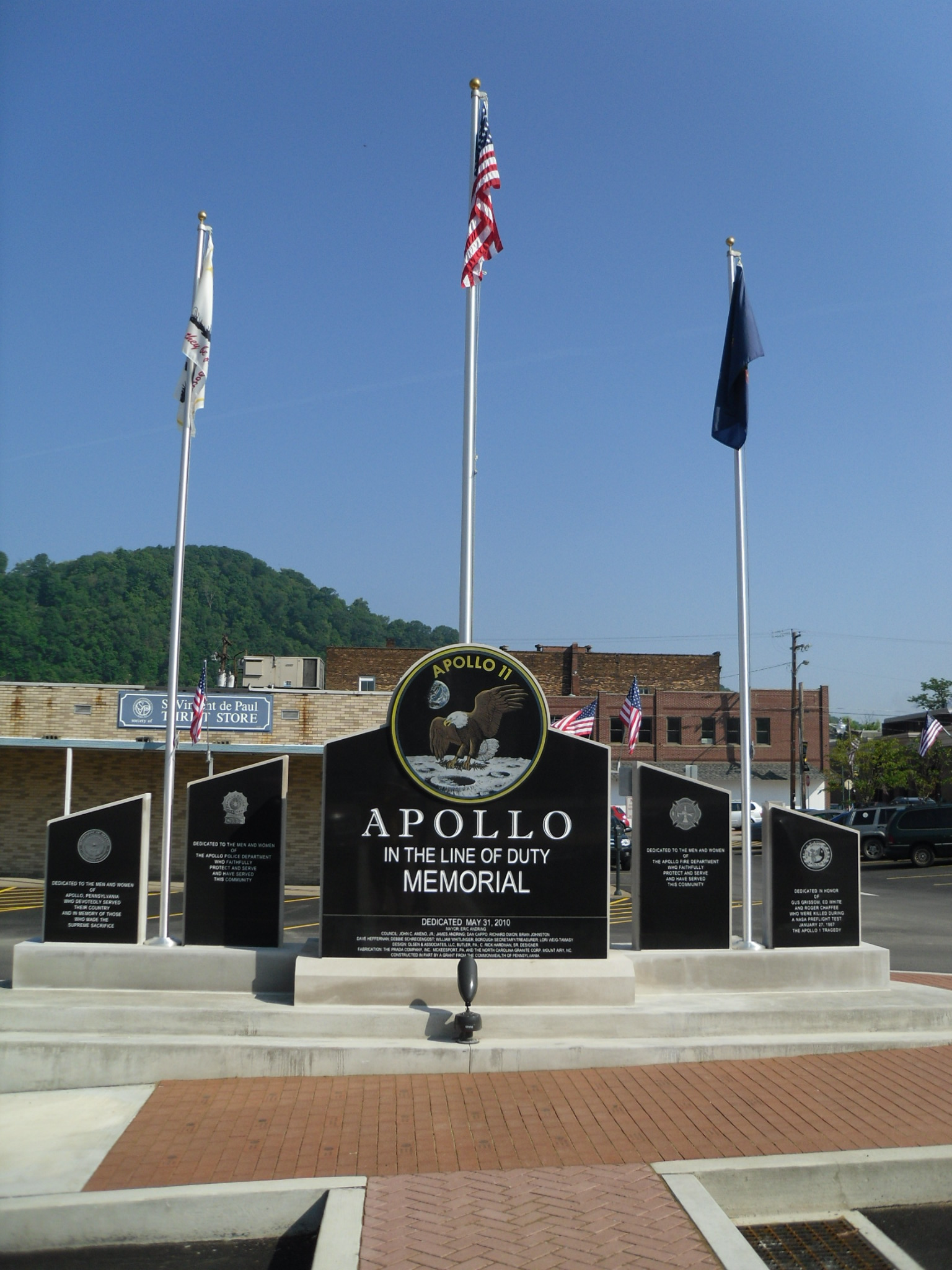
- Apollo 11 Memorial

- Location of Apollo in Armstrong County, Pennsylvania

- Location within Pennsylvania
- Coordinates: 40°35′03″N 79°33′52″W
- Country: United States
- State: Pennsylvania
- County: Armstrong
- Settled: 1816
- Incorporated: 1848

Government
  - Type: Borough
  - Mayor: Karen Kenzevich

Area
  - Total: 0.35 sq mi (0.90 km^{2})
  - Land: 0.31 sq mi (0.79 km^{2})
  - Water: 0.042 sq mi (0.11 km^{2})
- Elevation: 820 ft (250 m)

Population (2020)
  - Total: 1,615
  - Density: 5,290.0/sq mi (2,042.49/km^{2})
- Time zone: UTC-5 (Eastern (EST))
  - Summer (DST): UTC-4 (EDT)
- Zip code: 15613
- Area code: 724
- FIPS code: 42-02720
- Website: apollopa.net

Apollo is a borough in Armstrong County, Pennsylvania, United States, 35 miles (56 km) northeast of Pittsburgh in a former coal-mining region. Apollo was settled in 1790, laid out in 1816, and incorporated as a borough in 1848. The population was 1,615 at the 2020 United States census

== History ==
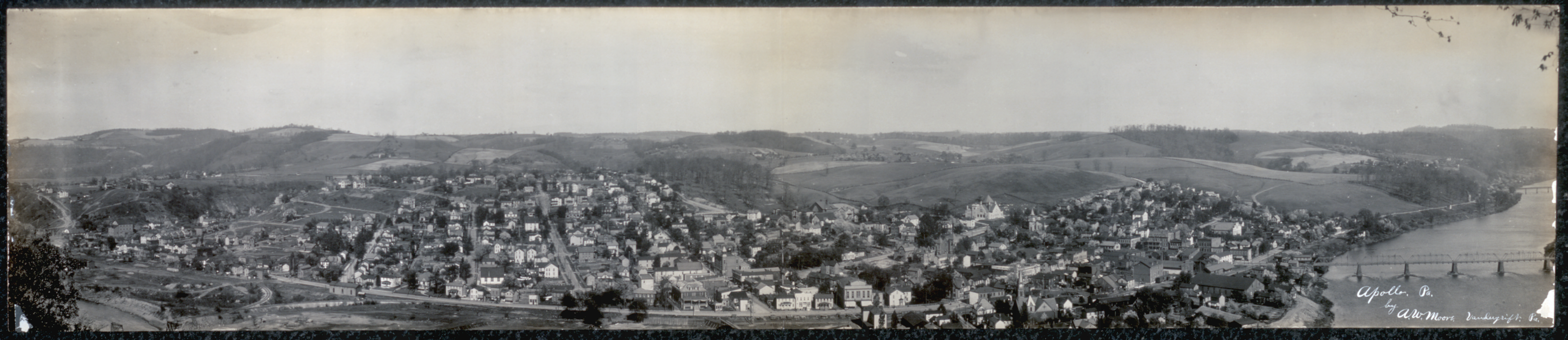
Panorama of Apollo, 1909

The area was sectioned in 1769, following the Treaty of Fort Stanwix, as a farm known as "Warren's Sleeping Place", named after a Native American trader from the area named Edward Warren. It was soon surveyed and divided into lots, with the town of Warren officially being added to the Greensburg register on November 9, 1816. The log cabin home of the Drake family still stands in the area, and is one of the oldest buildings in Armstrong County.

With the introduction of the post office, the area was officially renamed from Warren to Apollo in 1848 to avoid confusion with the post office of another town in Pennsylvania of the same name. The present name is after Apollo, the Greek and Roman god of music, healing, light, prophecy and enlightenment.

By the late 19th century the Apollo Iron & Steel Company dominated the local economy. In 1895, the company's president, George Gibson McMurtry, hired prominent landscape architects Olmsted, Olmsted and Eliot to design a town for Apollo Iron & Steel's workers. The result was the neighboring town of Vandergrift. In 1911, Apollo became home to the first public library in Armstrong County.

The Roaring Run Recreation Area is located one mile upriver (southeast) of Apollo and can be accessed via the Apollo Kiski River Trail. Stone remnants of the Western Division of the Pennsylvania Mainline Canal, that passed through Apollo and operated between 1825 and 1850, can be found along the Roaring Run Trail. The canal made use of the Kiskiminetas River using a system of slackwater dams, and the boats floated on the river, entering a lock located at the mouth of Roaring Run. From there the canal ran along the path of the current Roaring Run Trail, through the entire length of the borough, entering the Kiskiminetas River again across the river from where the current borough of East Vandergrift is situated.

The borough suffered significant damage in the 1936 St. Patrick's Day flood. The Kiskiminetas River rose more than 15 feet above flood stage. 95 area homes were damaged or washed away and the borough's bridge was destroyed, according to the Apollo Area Historical Society.

The Drake Log Cabin was listed on the National Register of Historic Places in 1983.

== Geography ==
Apollo is located on the Kiskiminetas River at 40°35′3″N 79°33′52″W (40.584103, -79.564363).

According to the United States Census Bureau, the borough has a total area of 0.35 square miles (0.9 km^{2}), of which 0.31 square miles (0.8 km^{2}) is land and 0.039 square miles (0.1 km^{2}), or 12.43%, is water.

== Surrounding and adjacent neighborhoods ==
Apollo has two land borders, including North Apollo to the north and Kiskiminetas Township to the east and south. Across the Kiskiminetas River in Westmoreland County to the west, Apollo runs adjacent with Oklahoma with the 1st Street Bridge as a connector.

== Demographics ==
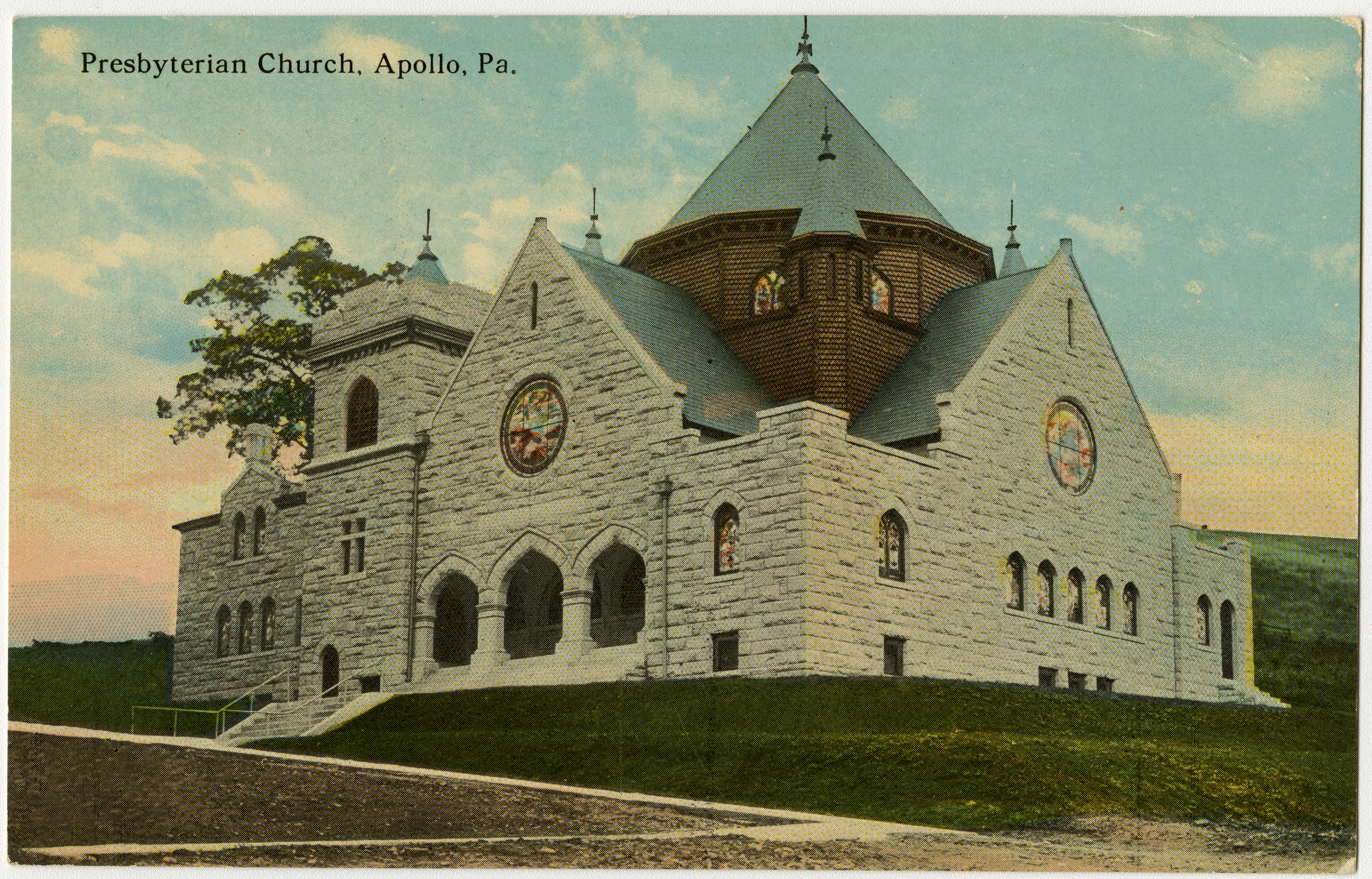
Apollo Presbyterian Church, before 1923

Historical population
Census	Pop.	Note	%±
1850	331		—
1860	449		35.6%
1870	764		70.2%
1880	1,156		51.3%
1890	2,156		86.5%
1900	2,924		35.6%
1910	3,006		2.8%
1920	3,227		7.4%
1930	3,406		5.5%
1940	3,232		−5.1%
1950	3,015		−6.7%
1960	2,694		−10.6%
1970	2,308		−14.3%
1980	2,212		−4.2%
1990	1,895		−14.3%
2000	1,765		−6.9%
2010	1,647		−6.7%
2020	1,615		−1.9%

At the 2020 census there were 1,408 people, 623 households residing in the borough. The population density was 4,612 per square mile. The racial makeup was 85% White, 5% African American, 1% Native American, 2% Asian, 0% Pacific Islander and 5% from two or more races. Hispanic or Latino of any race were 3% of the population.

There were 623 households, of which 56% were married couples living together, 13% had a female householder with no husband present, and 23% were non-families. The average household size was 2.2.

The median age of 41.5 years is more than the previous census, which had a median age of 37. The distribution by age group was 19% under the age of 18, 65% from 18 to 64, 16% who were 65 years of age or older. The median age was 41.5 years. The population was 52% male and 48% female.

The median household income was $43,173. The per capita income was $23,835. About 11.6% of the population were below the poverty line, including 9% of those under age 18 and 13% of those age 65 or over.

== Education ==
Apollo-Ridge School District, K–12

== Media ==
WJFA signed on as WAVL on April 15, 1947. The 5,000-watt station is at 910 on the AM dial.

== Notable people ==
- Nellie Bly, journalist and adventurer
- Ryan Hemphill, NASCAR driver
