= Crooked Creek (Allegheny River tributary) =

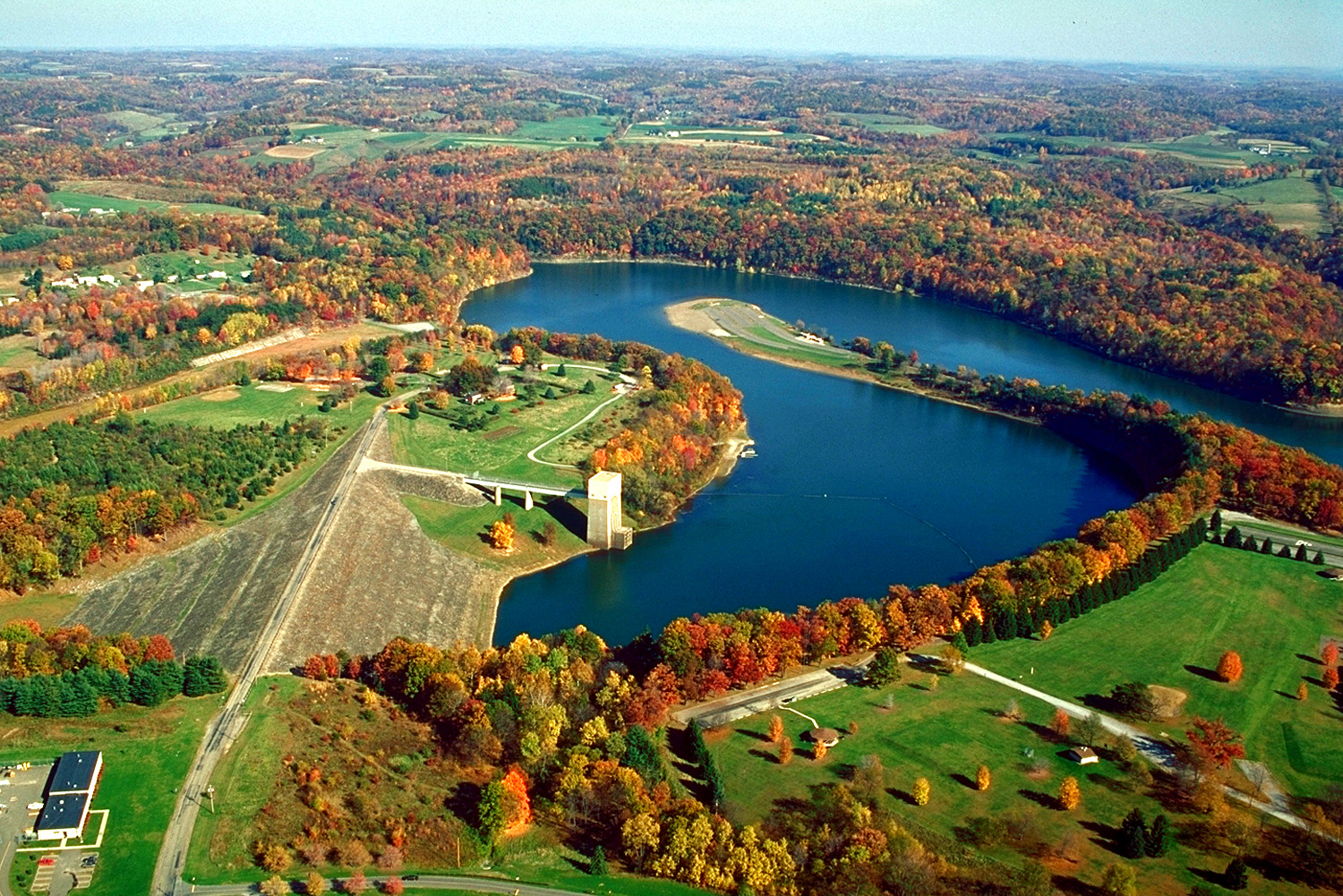
- The Crooked Creek Lake Recreation Area is a dam, reservoir, and park near Ford City, Armstrong County in the U.S. state of Pennsylvania.

Location
- Country: United States

Physical characteristics
- Source
  - coordinates: 40.6956207°N 79.078645°W
- Mouth
  - coordinates: 40.7489532°N 79.5536568°W
  - elevation: 771 ft (235 m)
- Discharge
  - location: Ford City
  - average: 694 cu ft/s (19.7 m^{3}/s)

Basin features
- River system: Allegheny River

Crooked Creek is a tributary of the Allegheny River in both Armstrong and Indiana counties in the U.S. state of Pennsylvania.

Several covered bridges span the stream and its tributaries in Indiana County. The Thomas Covered Bridge crosses Crooked Creek in Armstrong Township. The Harmon's Covered Bridge crosses the South Branch Plum Creek and the Trusal Covered Bridge crosses Plum Creek, tributaries of Crooked Creek, in Washington Township.

== Course ==
Crooked Creek joins the Allegheny River in both Bethel and Manor townships.

=== Tributaries ===
(Mouth at the Allegheny River)

- Campbell Run
- Elbow Run
- Horney Camp Run
- Coal Bank Run
- Beers Run
- Pine Run
- Cherry Run
  - North Branch Cherry Run
- Fagley Run
  - Long Run
- Sugar Run
- Lindsay Run
- Craig Run
- Gobblers Run
- Plum Creek
  - Dutch Run
  - Cessna Run
  - South Branch
    - Mudlick Run
    - Sugarcamp Run
    - Reddings Run
    - Leisure Run
    - Goose Run
  - North Branch
- Walker Run
- Anthony Run
- Curry Run
  - Cheese Run
- Mitchell Run
- Dark Hollow Run
- Fulton Run
- McKee Run
- Twomile Run
- Pine Run
- Brush Run
- Rayne Run

=== Political subdivisions ===
Crooked Creek traverses the following political subdivisions, named in order they are first encountered traveling downstream:

- Rayne Township, Indiana County
- Washington Township, Indiana County
- Creekside
- White Township, Indiana County
- Armstrong Township, Indiana County
- Plumcreek Township, Armstrong County
- South Bend Township, Armstrong County
- Burrell Township, Armstrong County
- Bethel Township, Armstrong County
- Kittanning Township, Armstrong County
- Manor Township, Armstrong County

== See also ==
- List of rivers of Pennsylvania
- List of tributaries of the Allegheny River
