= Allegheny Township, Armstrong County, Pennsylvania =

Allegheny Township, established on December 6, 1795, in Westmoreland County, Pennsylvania, was among the earliest administrative divisions in Western Pennsylvania. Covering a vast area, it included much of what would later become Armstrong County when the county was established in 1800. Named for the Allegheny River, which formed its western boundary, the township played a central role in the settlement, agricultural development, and industrialization of the region.

By the late 19th century, the growth of population and industry led to the subdivision of Allegheny Township into smaller municipalities. These included Kiskiminetas, Burrell, Bethel, Parks, and Gilpin Townships, as well as boroughs such as Leechburg and Aladdin. By 1878, Allegheny Township ceased to exist as an independent administrative entity, but its legacy continues through its descendant communities.

== History ==
=== Pre-settlement ===
The area that became Allegheny Township was originally inhabited by the Lenape (Delaware) and Shawnee tribes. The Allegheny and Kiskiminetas Rivers served as vital transportation routes, enabling trade and cultural exchange among Indigenous communities. Seasonal settlements along the rivers supported hunting, fishing, and agriculture.

Archaeological evidence, including tools and pottery shards, indicates that the area was an important hub in regional Indigenous trade networks extending into the Ohio and Mississippi River Valleys.

=== European exploration and early settlement ===
European exploration began in the mid-18th century, with figures such as Conrad Weiser documenting the region's resources and potential for settlement. Following the French and Indian War (1754–1763) and subsequent treaties, the area was opened to European colonists.

By the late 1700s, settlers of German and Scotch-Irish descent began arriving. These pioneers cleared forests, built log cabins, and established farms along the rivers. The fertile soil and abundant natural resources attracted settlers seeking self-sufficiency and opportunities for trade.

=== Creation of Allegheny Township ===
Allegheny Township was officially established on December 6, 1795, by the Court of Quarter Sessions of Westmoreland County. Its initial boundaries were expansive, covering much of present-day Armstrong County and portions of Indiana and Westmoreland Counties.

Its borders were initially described as follows:

"Beginning at the mouth of Altman’s Run (near Livermore in present-day Indiana County), following the run to William Findley’s mill, continuing along the division line between William Findley and William Robinson to the top of Laurel Hill, and then along the Kiskiminetas River to the starting point."

The township was named for the Allegheny River, a vital economic and transportation artery.

When Armstrong County was created on March 12, 1800, Allegheny Township became one of its original administrative divisions, consisting of nearly half of the county.

== Economic development ==
=== Agriculture ===
Agriculture was the foundation of Allegheny Township's economy. Early settlers cultivated crops such as wheat, corn, oats, and hay, while raising livestock for meat, dairy, and wool. The floodplains along the Allegheny and Kiskiminetas Rivers provided ideal conditions for farming, allowing for surplus production that was traded locally and transported to Pittsburgh.

=== Timber industry ===
The township's forests provided a steady supply of timber, which was processed at sawmills along the rivers and streams. Timber was used for local construction and exported via the rivers to Pittsburgh and other growing markets. The industry also supported the construction of flatboats and other vessels.

=== Coal mining ===
The discovery of coal in the Pittsburgh Coal Seam during the early 19th century spurred industrial growth in the township. Mines opened throughout the area, supplying coal to Pittsburgh's burgeoning steel industry and fueling local businesses. Coal mining attracted immigrant labor, contributing to the township's population growth and economic diversification.

=== Transportation ===
The Allegheny and Kiskiminetas Rivers were vital for transportation, enabling the movement of agricultural products, timber, and coal. The construction of the Pennsylvania Canal in the 1820s and 1830s enhanced trade routes, connecting the township to Pittsburgh and other markets. By the mid-19th century, railroads, including the Allegheny Valley Railroad, further improved transportation, supporting the shipment of goods and encouraging industrial expansion.

== Formation of boroughs ==
=== Leechburg Borough (March 11, 1853) ===
Leechburg was created on September 13, 1850, and separated from Allegheny Township on March 11, 1853, as the first borough formed from Allegheny Township. Located along the Kiskiminetas River, it became an industrial hub known for its steel production and pioneering use of natural gas in manufacturing. Its location made it a key center for river trade and industry.

=== Aladdin Borough (September 12, 1867) ===
Aladdin Borough was incorporated September 12, 1867 from Allegheny Township. Located slightly North of the junction of the Kisiminetas and Allegheny Rivers in present-day Gilpin Township, Aladdin was formed around coal and natural gas. The Borough had a short lived life, dissolving after only 11 years on March 7, 1878.

== Subdivisions into smaller townships ==
As the population grew, Allegheny Township was subdivided to create smaller administrative units:

- Armstrong Township, Indiana County (March 12, 1800)
- Kittanning Township (September 18, 1806)
- Kiskiminetas Township (June 19, 1832)
- Burrell Township (1854)
- Bethel Township (December 26, 1878)
- Parks Township (December 26, 1878)
- Gilpin Township (December 26, 1878)

== Decline and legacy ==
By 1878, Allegheny Township had been fully subdivided into smaller municipalities, including boroughs such as Leechburg and townships such as Bethel, Parks, and Gilpin. Although it ceased to exist as an administrative entity, the legacy of Allegheny Township endures through these descendant communities, which continue to reflect its rich agricultural, industrial, and cultural heritage.
