= Thomas Covered Bridge =

Thomas Covered Bridge may refer to:

- Oakachoy Covered Bridge in Alabama
- Thomas Covered Bridge (Pennsylvania) in Indiana County
