= Johnetta =

Johnetta may refer to:

- Johnnetta Cole (born 1936), American anthropologist, educator, museum director, and college president
- Johnetta Elzie (born 1989), American civil rights activist
- Johnetta, Pennsylvania, community in Gilpin Township, Armstrong County, United States
