= Murphy Island (Pennsylvania) =

Privately owned alluvial island in the Allegheny River in Gilpin Township

Coordinates: 40°41′22″N 79°38′07″W

Murphy Island (also known as Donley Island) is a privately owned alluvial island in the Allegheny River in Gilpin Township, Armstrong County in the U.S. state of Pennsylvania. The island is situated across from South Buffalo Township.

The elevation of Murphy Island is 758 feet above sea level.
