= Gilpin Township, Armstrong County, Pennsylvania =

Township in Pennsylvania, US

Coordinates: 40°39′53″N 79°37′59″W

Gilpin Township, Pennsylvania
- Township
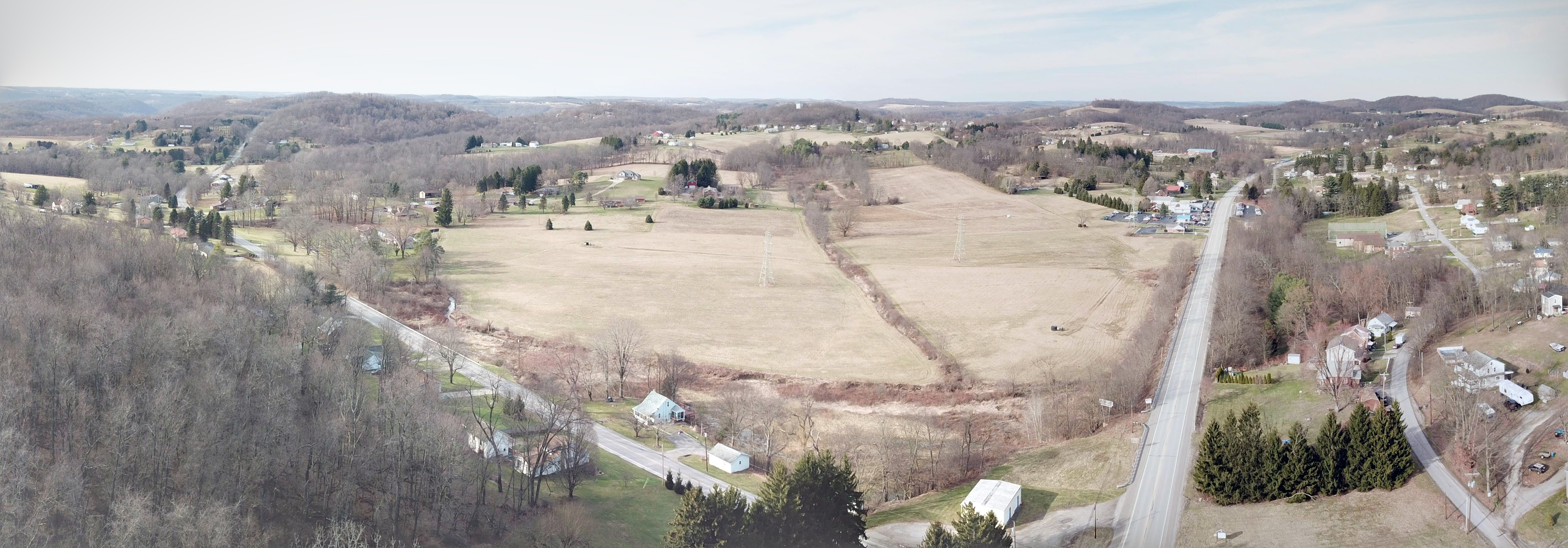
- A drone image of Gilpin Township near Schenley Road

- Seal

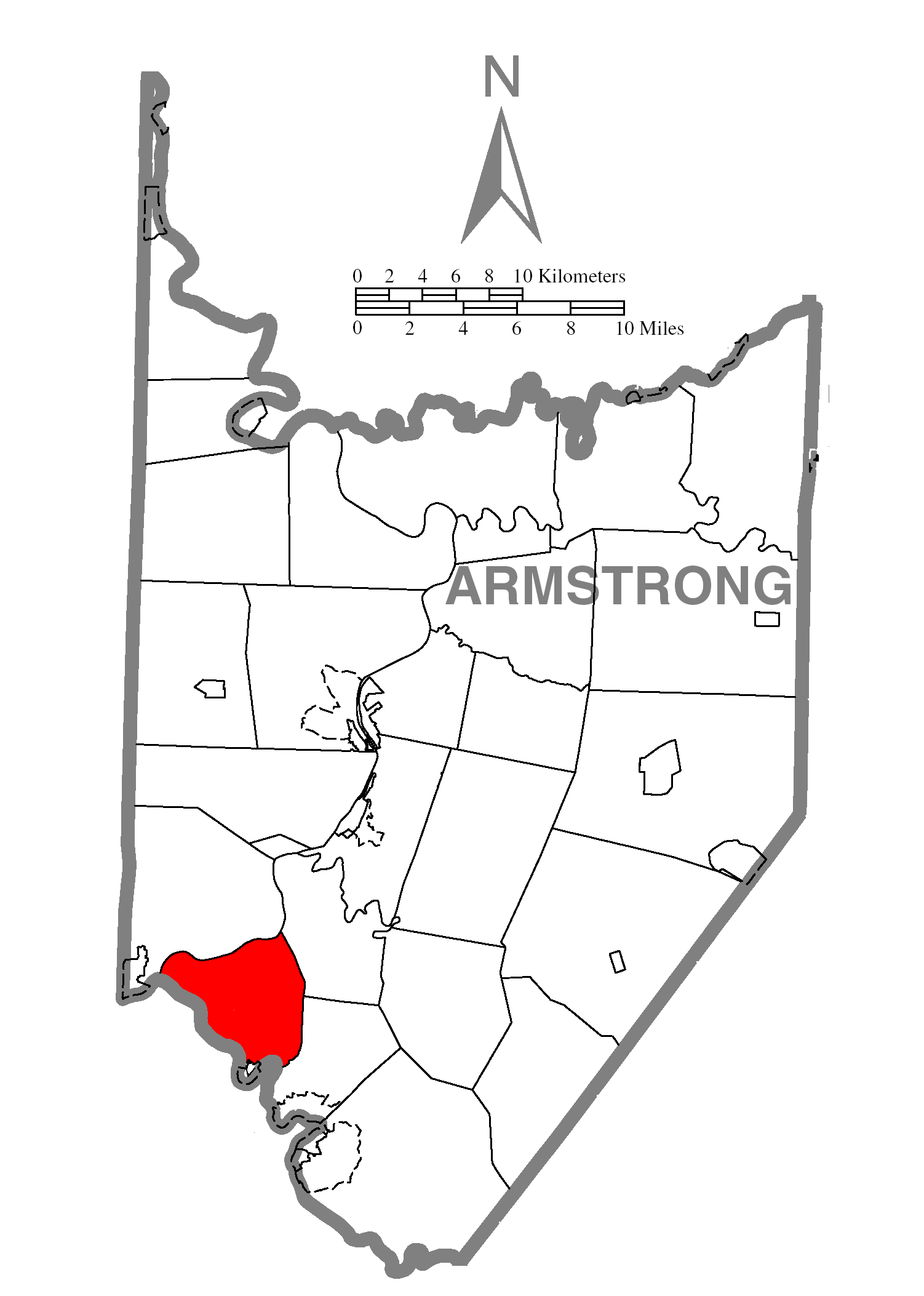
- Map of Armstrong County, Pennsylvania, highlighting Gilpin Township
- Country: United States
- State: Pennsylvania
- County: Armstrong
- Settled: 1812-1814
- Chartered: December 26, 1878
- Named for: John Gilpin, Esq.

Government
  - Type: Board of Supervisors
  - Supervisor Chair: Tina Thompson
  - Supervisor Vice-Chair: Gary Hall
  - Supervisor: Jeremy Smail
  - Supervisor: Kevin Miller
  - Supervisor: Charles Stull

Area
  - Total: 17.14 sq mi (44.40 km^{2})
  - Land: 16.45 sq mi (42.6 km^{2})
  - Water: 0.69 sq mi (1.8 km^{2})

Population (2020)
  - Total: 2,411
- Time zone: UTC-5 (Eastern (EST))
  - Summer (DST): UTC-4 (EDT)
- Zip Code: 15656
- Area code: 724
- FIPS code: 42-005-29184
- Website: gilpintwp.com.

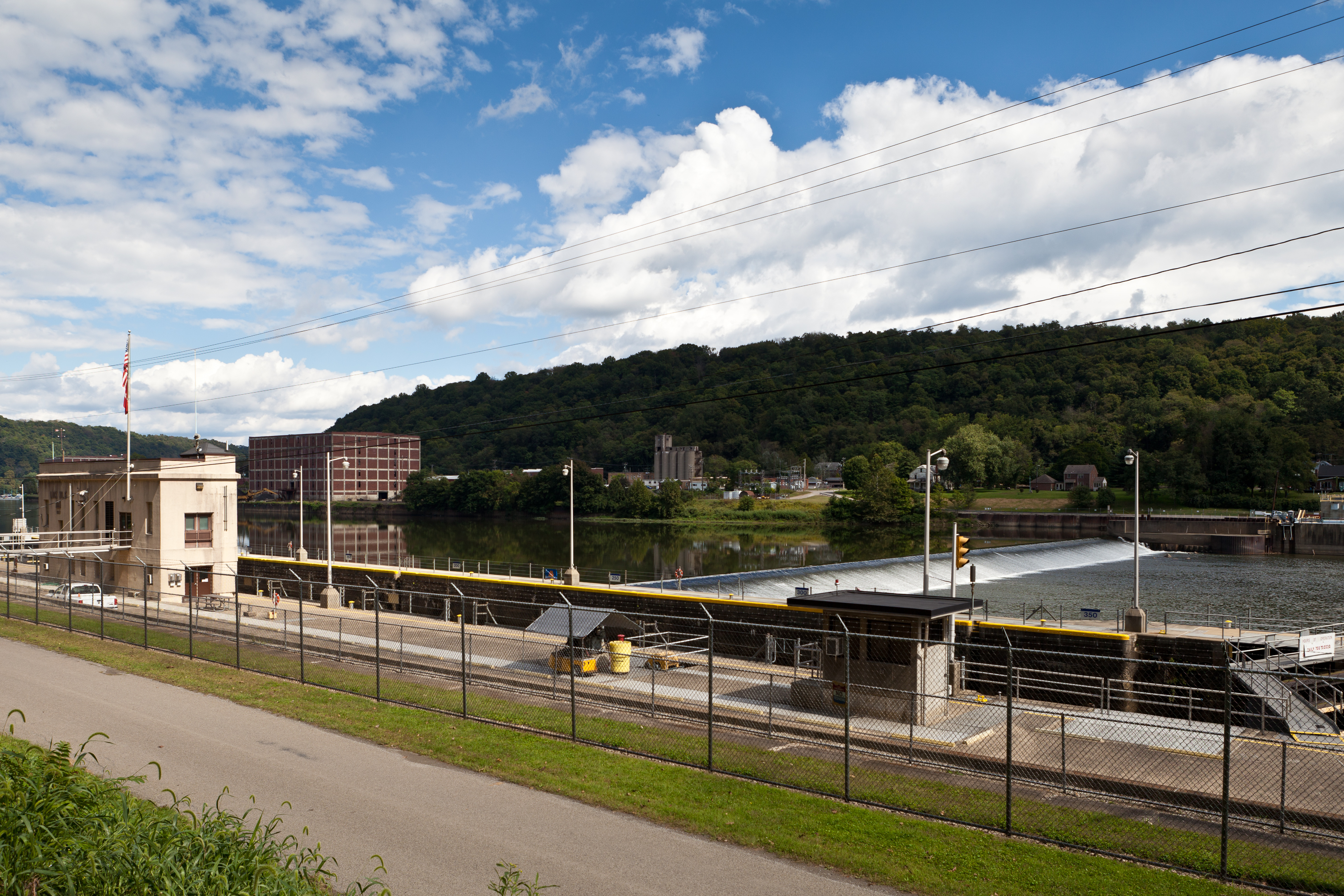
Allegheny River Lock and Dam No. 5 overlooking Schenley from South Buffalo Township.

Gilpin Township is a Second class Township in Armstrong County, Pennsylvania, United States. It is a township rich in history, dating back to early 19th-century settlement. Officially incorporated on December 26, 1878, it evolved from an agricultural and timber-based economy to an industrial hub, supported by its abundant natural resources—including coal, salt, timber, natural gas, and sand—and its strategic location along the Allegheny and Kiskiminetas Rivers. These rivers not only fostered trade and transportation but also enabled Gilpin’s transformation into a manufacturing center. The township includes various communities—Bagdad, Johnetta, Schenley, Georgetown, Banfield, Forks Church, Aladdin, and Maher Heights—each contributing uniquely to its development and legacy. As of the 2020 Census, its population was 2,411.

== History ==
=== Early Settlement and Formation ===
Originally part of Allegheny Township, Westmoreland County, (Armstrong County effective November 1805) which was incorporated March 12, 1800, the area that is now Gilpin Township attracted settlers around 1812 due to its fertile soil, dense forests, and access to major rivers. Early families, including the Bolens, Coulters, and Klingensmiths, established homesteads, cleared land, and developed farms that would form the foundation of the township’s agrarian economy. The rivers served as vital transportation routes, allowing settlers to trade with neighboring communities and supporting early economic growth.

As the population of Allegheny grew to 2,539 at the 1870 Census and economic activities continued to expand in the 1870’s, residents began seeking local governance to better address the needs of their community. John Gilpin, Esq., a prominent attorney from Kittanning, played a crucial role in organizing the formation of the township, which was formally established on December 26, 1878, and named in his honor. Gilpin Township’s incorporation allowed for better management and governance, facilitating future growth and development.

==== Agricultural Foundations and Timber Industry ====
In its early years, Gilpin Township’s economy was largely agrarian. Settlers cultivated crops such as corn, oats, and wheat and raised livestock, establishing a self-sufficient, agriculturally driven community. Farming provided economic stability and allowed Gilpin’s population to grow and thrive.

The township’s abundant forests led to a prosperous timber industry. The first sawmill was built by Michael Barrickman on Elder’s Run in 1812, with another established by Philip Klingensmith in 1817. These sawmills processed timber for construction and trade, marking timber as one of Gilpin’s first commercial exports. Timber supplied local needs and contributed to the development of neighboring towns, providing a stable economic foundation that would support future growth in other industries.

==== Industrialization: Coal, Salt, Natural Gas, and Sand ====
The discovery of coal in the Pittsburgh Coal Seam in the mid-19th century marked a transformative period for Gilpin Township’s economy. This high-quality coal seam extended through several areas, including Maher Heights, Georgetown, Johnetta, and Aladdin, attracting mining companies and spurring rapid economic expansion. Coal mining soon became the township’s dominant industry, providing steady employment and drawing more settlers to the area. The extracted coal was transported along the Allegheny and Kiskiminetas Rivers to Pittsburgh and other industrial centers, solidifying Gilpin’s role as a key coal supplier. By the late 1800s, railroads further expanded the township’s reach, linking it to broader markets and fueling continued growth.

Salt mining also became significant, particularly in the village of Bagdad. Salt was crucial for food preservation before refrigeration, making it a valuable resource. Bagdad’s salt mines supplied local and regional markets, with salt transported along the Kiskiminetas River and the Pennsylvania Railroad. A notable section along the canal, known as “Wherry’s Defeat,” became infamous after a failed riprap wall construction by contractor James Wherry, exemplifying the challenges of infrastructure projects at that time.

Aladdin became notable for pioneering the use of natural gas. Wells drilled in Aladdin supplied gas to the nearby town of Leechburg, marking one of the first commercial uses of natural gas in Western Pennsylvania.

In addition to coal, salt, and natural gas, Gilpin Township has rich sand deposits, which were mined by companies such as Allegheny Metals & Minerals for use in glassmaking and construction. Although sand mining was less prominent than other industries, it added to the township’s industrial diversity and economic resilience, contributing to Gilpin’s reputation as a resource-rich area.

=== Key Communities and Their Contributions ===
Each community within Gilpin Township contributed uniquely to its economy, culture, and historical landscape.

==== Bagdad ====
Bagdad, located along the Kiskiminetas River, emerged as an early settlement and industrial hub in Gilpin Township. Known for both salt and coal mining, Bagdad’s name is believed to have originated from the phrase “Here comes a bag, dad,” referencing the salt industry’s practice of bagging salt for transport. Bagdad’s proximity to the Pennsylvania Canal and later the Pennsylvania Railroad made it an essential transit point for the township’s resources, connecting it to larger markets.

Bagdad’s industrial importance was underscored by its location near “Wherry’s Defeat”—a segment of the canal notorious for construction difficulties. Contractor James Wherry faced significant setbacks while building a riprap retaining wall to stabilize the canal path along the river, which collapsed due to flooding. This incident left a lasting local story about the challenges of infrastructure projects in the area.

In the 1960s, Bagdad saw a major transformation when Allegheny Ludlum (now Allegheny Technologies, Inc.) acquired the land to build an industrial mill across the river from their West Leechburg plant. This acquisition led to the relocation of residents and the demolition of buildings. The mill operated until 2016, and today, Bagdad exists solely in memory. The site, now occupied by the mill’s shuttered facilities, stands as a relic of the village’s industrial past, marking the end of Bagdad’s active role in Gilpin Township’s economy.

==== Johnetta ====
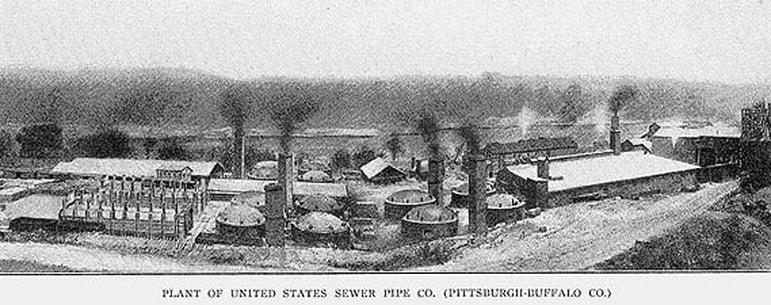

Johnetta, once a thriving industrial town along the Allegheny River, was founded in 1892 when a significant 15-foot clay seam was discovered after the area’s Kittanning coal seam had been exhausted. This discovery spurred the establishment of the United States Sewer Pipe Company, which specialized in manufacturing pavers, high-grade bricks, and sewer pipes, employing about 500 workers at its peak. The town was named after John H. Jones, the head of the Pittsburgh-Buffalo Company, and his daughter Etta, reflecting its close ties to the company that created and sustained the town.

Johnetta was strategically positioned with access to the Allegheny Valley Railroad and the nearby river, making it easy to transport products to market. The discovery of natural gas below the clay seam and additional coal deposits further fueled the town’s rapid growth. With around 140 homes, a

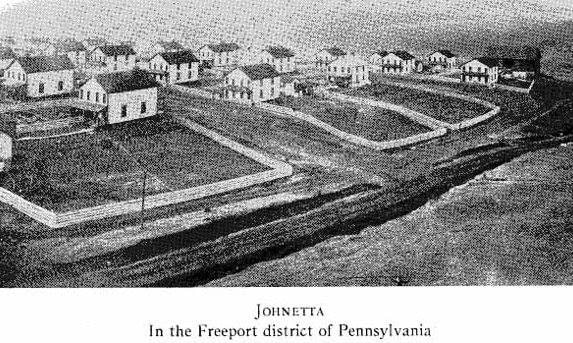

company store, schoolhouse, and the Johnetta Memorial Church, the town was a well-equipped community where residents could live close to their work.

Incorporated as a borough on January 26, 1905, Johnetta symbolized the boom of company towns in the industrial era. However, its fortunes declined in the 1920s when the Pittsburgh Plate Glass Company acquired and subsequently closed the plant. The town struggled economically without its industrial base, and on June 4, 1930, Johnetta was officially dissolved as a borough. Today, the former site of Johnetta serves as one of Gilpin Township’s three riverside campgrounds, preserving the memory of a once-bustling community that played an important role in the region’s industrial history.

==== Schenley ====
Schenley, situated at the confluence of the Allegheny and Kiskiminetas Rivers in Gilpin Township, became a prominent center of American whiskey production and a major industrial site in the early 20th century. The land in Schenley was originally owned by Mary Elizabeth Croghan Schenley, a Pittsburgh heiress who inherited a vast real estate portfolio across Western Pennsylvania. Her estate’s holdings and strategic location made Schenley an ideal location for industrial ventures.

In 1888, chemist Frank Sinclair, his brother Harry Sinclair, and investor Henry Bischoff established the Schenley Distilling Company. The area’s pure water sources, proximity to coal mines, and access to the Allegheny Valley Railroad and major shipping routes influenced their decision to set up operations in Schenley. These resources, coupled with the rising demand for whiskey and spirits, enabled the company to grow quickly. Over time, Schenley Distilling Company became one of the largest whiskey producers in the United States, with its products gaining nationwide recognition.

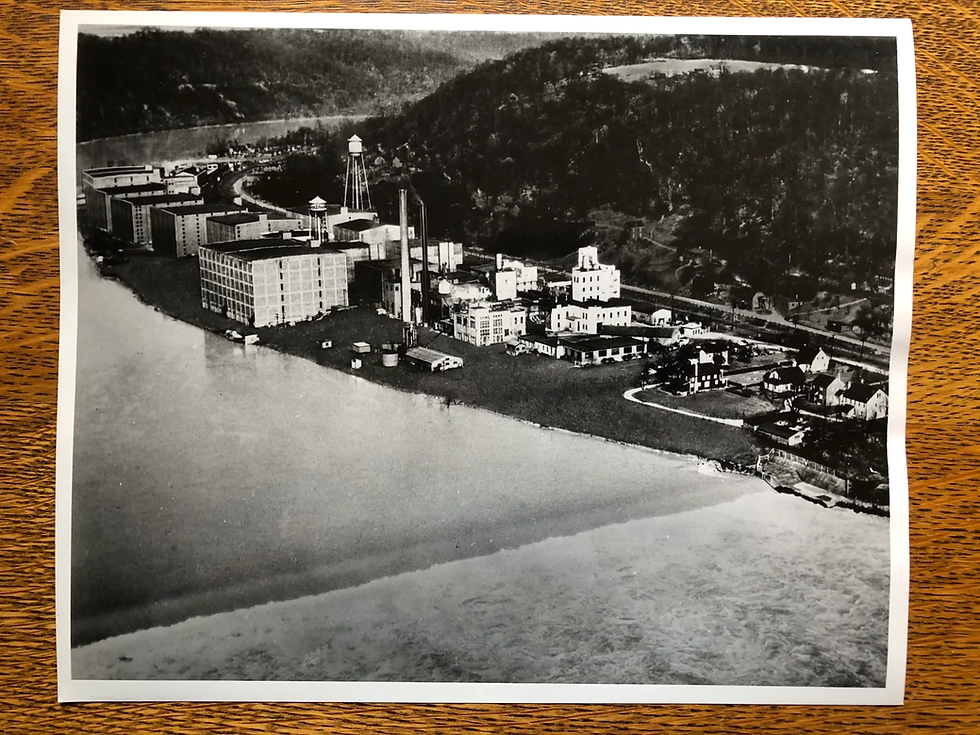

During Prohibition (1920-1933), Schenley Distilling was one of the few distilleries permitted to continue operations under a government license to produce medicinal alcohol. This rare allowance enabled the company to retain its workforce and maintain its infrastructure, while many other distilleries across the country were forced to shut down. The medicinal license allowed Schenley to position itself strategically for growth after Prohibition ended. By the time the Prohibition repeal arrived, Schenley was ready to scale up rapidly, acquiring several other distilleries, brands, and distribution networks, ultimately establishing itself as an industry powerhouse.

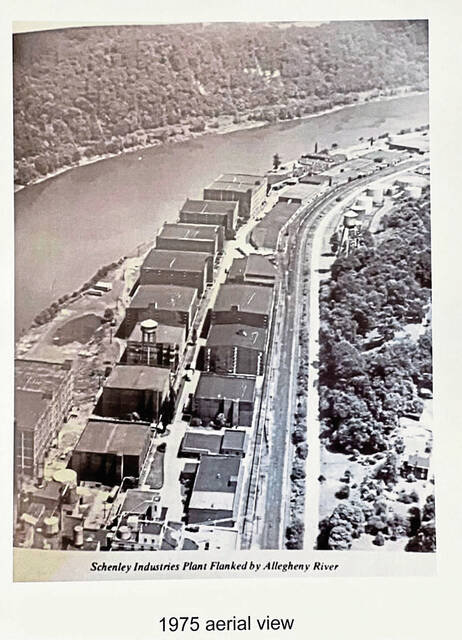

In its peak years, Schenley was a self-contained industrial community that featured 67 buildings spread across a 60-acre complex. The site included warehouses for aging whiskey, bottling facilities, and office buildings. Additionally, the Schenley complex included recreational facilities for employees, such as a bowling alley, an auditorium, and the Schenley Club—a social venue where employees gathered, enjoying views over the river. The Schenley Club symbolized the company’s commitment to its workers, fostering a community spirit within the industrial site.

Schenley’s impact extended beyond its physical location. The company owned several other prominent brands and distilleries across the country, including the historic Glenmore Distillery and the Old Quaker distillery, contributing to its position as a leading American distiller. In 1968, the Glen Alden Corporation acquired Schenley, moving its headquarters to the Empire State Building in New York City. Despite these corporate changes, the Schenley plant in Gilpin Township continued production until November 11, 1983, when the last truckload of whiskey departed the plant, marking the end of an era.

Today, the site once occupied by Schenley Distilling Company remains active with Armstrong Terminal, Inc., and BPI Inc. utilizing the area, maintaining a connection to Schenley’s industrial past. Additionally, Schenley has become a recreational area within Gilpin Township, featuring two riverside campgrounds along the riverbanks as well as the Schenley Trailhead of the Armstrong Trail (Formerly Allegheny Valley Land Trust). These campgrounds attract campers, fishers, and boating enthusiasts, blending Schenley’s industrial heritage with its recreational appeal, ensuring that the legacy of this once-prominent whiskey town endures.

==== Aladdin ====
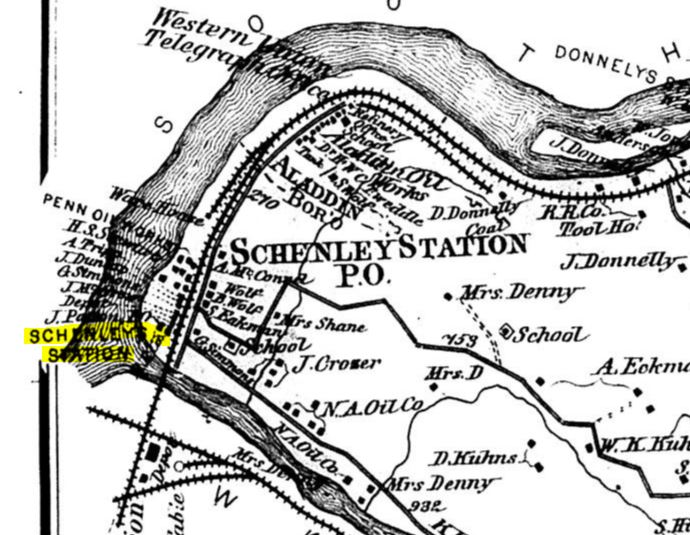
Aladdin Borough as seen on am 1876 map of Allegheny Township, Now Gilpin Township.

Aladdin, located within Gilpin Township just north of Schenley, became an industrial center known for coal mining and natural gas production. Incorporated as a Borough on September 12, 1867 and dissolved on March 7, 1878, 1870 Census Records show a population of 29. The community’s true growth began, after its dissolution as a Borough, in 1894 when a group of miners established coal operations in the area, mining the Freeport vein, a valuable coal seam that could be accessed through “drifting” techniques. Although the miners initially faced financial challenges, the operation was revitalized in 1898 when Joseph G. Beale of Leechburg acquired the works, forming the Aladdin Coal Company and establishing a stable coal mining enterprise. This connection to the Allegheny Valley Railroad facilitated efficient transport, further boosting the industry.

Aladdin also became notable for its natural gas production. William Porterie, a Greek immigrant, drilled for gas on land acquired from the Schenley estate. His success in uncovering a reliable gas source enabled him to supply nearby towns, including Freeport and Leechburg, marking one of the first instances of commercial natural gas use in Western Pennsylvania. Aladdin’s coal and natural gas industries underscored its importance as a significant contributor to the local economy and Gilpin Township’s industrial heritage.

==== Georgetown ====
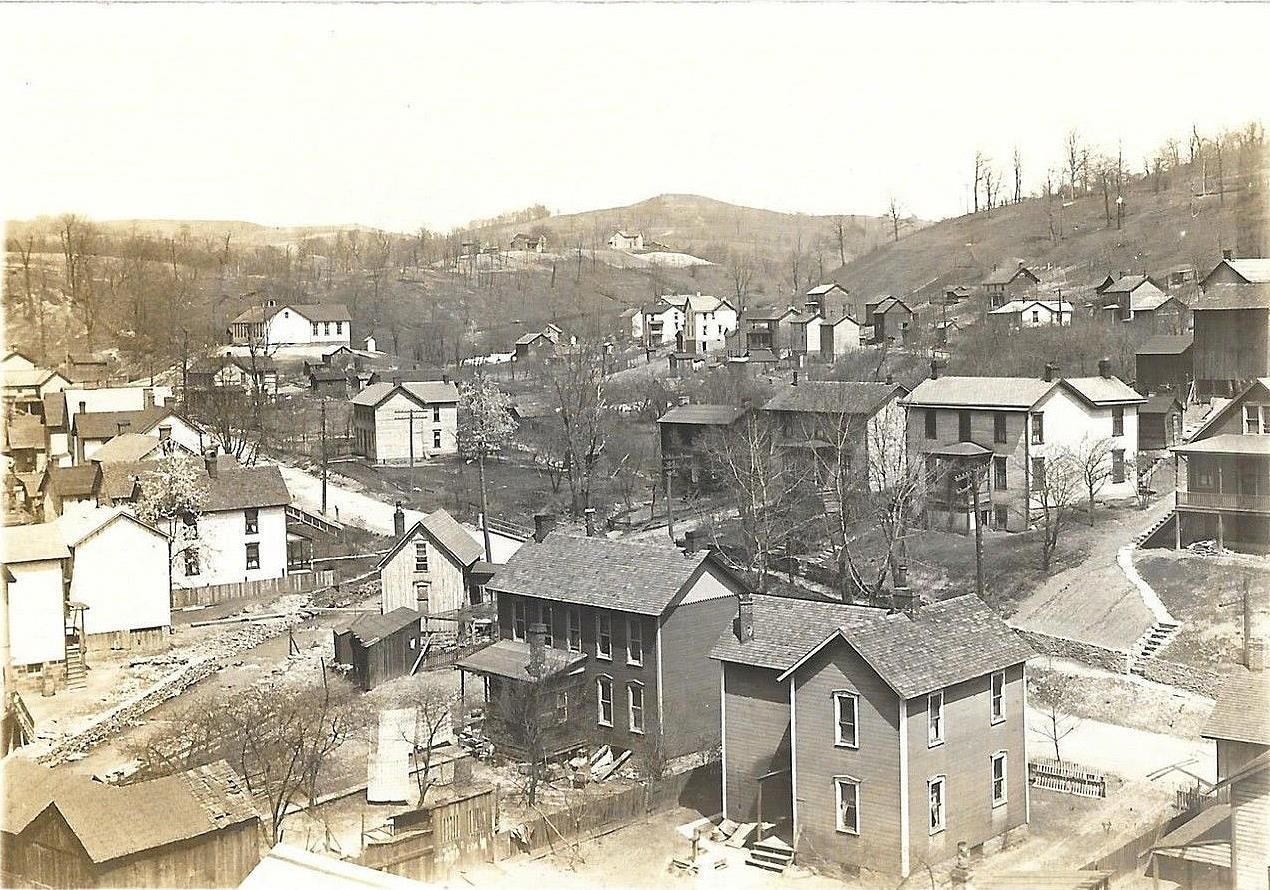
Georgetown Circa 1910s

Georgetown developed as a residential community near the Kiskiminetas River for coal miners. Miners and their families typically lived in company-owned housing, which fostered a close-knit, working-class community. Although coal mining has since declined, Georgetown remains a symbol of Gilpin’s early industrial spirit.

==== Banfield ====
Banfield, a residential area near Georgetown and Leechburg and along the Kiskiminetas River, provided housing for workers in Gilpin’s mines and other industries. Its location near the river and industrial centers allowed it to support the township’s labor needs, forming part of the cohesive network of industrial communities within Gilpin.

==== Forks Church ====
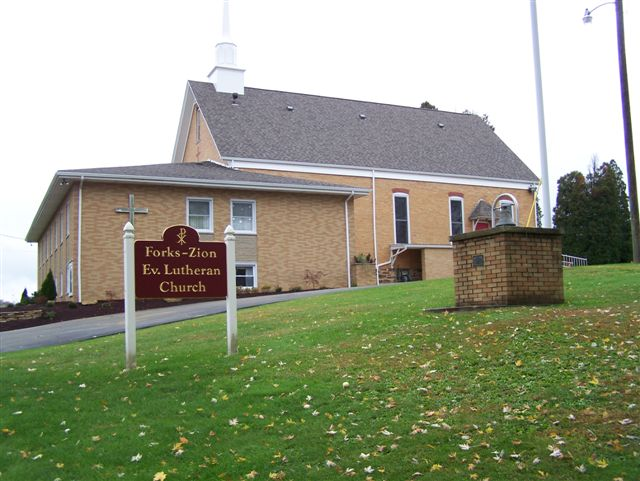

Forks Church, home to the Zion Evangelical Lutheran Church, is a historically significant site in Gilpin Township. Established in the early 19th century, the church began as a gathering point for German-speaking settlers near the “fork” of the Allegheny and Kiskiminetas Rivers. This location provided the name “Forks Church” and served as the foundation for the congregation, which was formally incorporated in 1849. The original frame church building was constructed shortly after incorporation but was tragically destroyed by fire in 1869. It was replaced by a new frame structure at a cost of $3,000, serving as the spiritual home for many in the township.

The church played a central role in the community, not only as a place of worship but also as a cultural and historical center. In 1937, the Daughters of the American Revolution, through the Fort Hand Chapter, undertook an effort to preserve the church’s baptismal records, translating and transcribing them from the original German. These records provide invaluable insights into the lives of early Gilpin residents and reflect the rich heritage of German immigrants in the area.

Forks Church also includes a large cemetery, sometimes referred to as the “Burial Ground,” where many Civil War veterans and soldiers from the War of 1812 and the Mexican-American War are interred. A parsonage was added in 1905, offering a residence for pastors and enhancing the church’s community role. Forks Church remains a landmark of historical and cultural significance, preserving the legacy of early settlers and the generations that followed.

==== Maher Heights ====
Maher Heights, primarily a mining community, centered around coal mines operated by the Hicks Coal Company. The company provided housing for miners and their families, creating a close-knit community centered on coal production. Maher Heights extended into Georgetown, with additional housing for miners, highlighting the township’s strong connection to the coal industry.

=== Influence of the Allegheny and Kiskiminetas Rivers ===
The Allegheny and Kiskiminetas Rivers were vital to Gilpin Township’s economic growth, supporting the movement of coal, salt, timber, and sand to broader markets, particularly Pittsburgh. These rivers linked Gilpin’s resources to larger cities, allowing the township to flourish as an industrial center. Today, these rivers contribute to Gilpin’s recreational appeal, attracting anglers, boaters, and nature enthusiasts and supporting the township’s transition to a rural and leisure-focused community.

=== Infrastructure and Notable Landmarks ===
Gilpin Township includes the Allegheny River Lock and Dam No. 5, a significant infrastructure project constructed between 1920 and 1927 by the U.S. Army Corps of Engineers. This facility, which features a lock measuring 56 by 360 feet and an 11.6-foot lift, was added to the National Register of Historic Places in 2000. The dam is approximately 22 feet high and 632 feet long and represents Gilpin’s role in regional waterway management and infrastructure development. As of 2024, Lock No. 5 is the northern most Lock which operates for industrial purposes.

=== Present and Future of Gilpin Township ===
Today, Gilpin Township focuses on recreational development, industrial development, and community preservation. Existing industries, such as Armstrong Terminal, Inc., and BPI Inc., maintain a modest presence, while the township’s three riverside campgrounds—two in Schenley and one in Johnetta—draw visitors for camping, fishing, and outdoor activities, bolstering tourism and supporting the local economy. Recent zoning updates and a planned comprehensive review of the township’s policies aim to balance industrial growth with rural preservation, ensuring that Gilpin’s future aligns with community values.

== Geography ==
Pennsylvania Route 66 is the main highway that runs through the township, with Leechburg Borough, Parks Township, and Bethel Township at each entrance. Gilpin is bordered on the west by the Allegheny River and to the south by the Kiskiminetas River. The community of Schenley is located within Gilpin Township at the confluence of the two rivers. Murphy Island is within the township in the Allegheny River.

According to the United States Census Bureau, Gilpin Township has a total area of 17.1 square miles (44.4 km^{2}), of which 16.4 square miles (42.6 km^{2}) is land and 0.69 square miles (1.8 km^{2}), or 4.05%, is water.

== Demographics ==
Historical population
Census	Pop.	Note	%±
1880	1,190		—
1890	1,156		−2.9%
1900	1,875		62.2%
1910	2,334		24.5%
1920	2,702		15.8%
1930	2,779		2.8%
1940	2,929		5.4%
1950	3,061		4.5%
1960	3,229		5.5%
1970	3,086		−4.4%
1980	2,967		−3.9%
1990	2,804		−5.5%
2000	2,587		−7.7%
2010	2,496		−3.5%
2020	2,411		−3.4%
U.S. Decennial Census

According to the 2020 United States Census, Gilpin Township had a population of 2,411 people, residing in 1,118 housing units. The township had a land area of approximately 28.7 square miles (74.3 km²), resulting in a population density of about 83.9 people per square mile (32.4/km²).

The racial composition of the township was 96.9% White, 0.3% African American, 0.3% Asian, 0.1% Native American, 0.3% from other races, and 2.1% from two or more races. Individuals who were Hispanic or Latino of any race made up 0.7% of the population.

Of the total population, 48.7% were male and 51.3% were female. The median age was 50.4 years. There were 1,055 households in the township, with an average household size of approximately 2.3 persons.

According to the 2018–2022 American Community Survey 5-Year Estimates, Gilpin Township had a population of approximately 2,302 residents. The township covers a land area of about 16.5 square miles, resulting in a population density of roughly 139.9 people per square mile.

The racial makeup of the township was 96.9% White, 0.3% Black or African American, 0.3% Asian, 0.1% Native American, 0.3% from other races, and 2.1% from two or more races. Hispanic or Latino of any race were 0.7% of the population.

There were an estimated 1,035 households, with an average household size of 2.2 persons. The median age was 50.7 years.

The median household income was $69,345, and the per capita income was $38,745. About 6.7% of the population was below the poverty line.

There were 1,249 housing units in the township. The median value of owner-occupied housing units was $144,100.

Approximately 93.2% of residents aged 25 and over had at least a high school diploma, and 17.2% held a bachelor's degree or higher. Veterans made up 9.9% of the population.

== Churches ==
- Forks- Zion Evangelical Lutheran Church

- Christ the King Church

== Cemeteries ==
- Evergreen Cemetery
- Forks - Zion Lutheran Evangelical Church Cemetery
- Saint Catherine Cemetery

== Notable people ==
- Mickey Morandini – Former Major League Baseball second baseman who played 11 seasons, primarily with the Philadelphia Phillies. Born in Kittanning and raised in Gilpin Township, Morandini attended Leechburg Area High School before playing collegiate baseball at Indiana University. He was selected as a National League All-Star in 1995 and is known for completing an unassisted triple play in 1992. After retiring, he served as a coach and instructor in the Phillies organization.
- John H. Jones – President of the Pittsburgh-Buffalo Company and founder of the town of Johnetta, a planned company town within Gilpin Township that supported a brickworks in the early 20th century.
