= Allegheny River Lock and Dam No. 5 =

- U.S. National Register of Historic Places
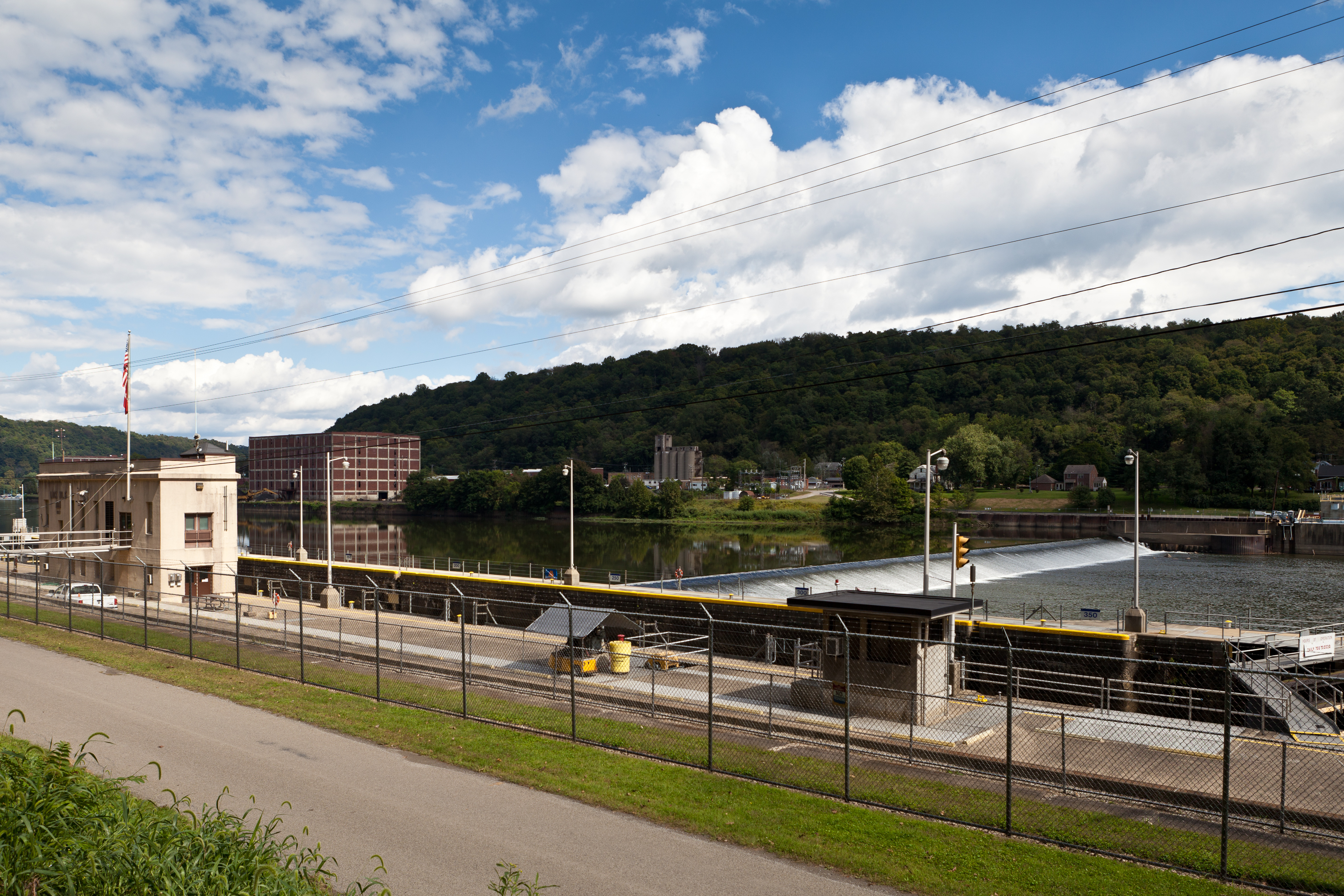
- Allegheny River Lock and Dam No. 5, September 2013

- Location within Pennsylvania Location within the United States
- Location: 830 River Rd., Gilpin Township, Pennsylvania and South Buffalo Township, Pennsylvania
- Coordinates: 40°41′09″N 79°39′59″W
- Area: 33 acres (13 ha)
- Built: 1920-1927
- Built by: Corps of Engineer; Dravo Construction Company
- Architectural style: Moderne
- MPS: Allegheny River Navigation System MPS
- NRHP reference No.: 00000399
- Added to NRHP: April 21, 2000

Allegheny River Lock and Dam No. 5 is a historic lock and fixed-crest dam complex located at Gilpin Township and South Buffalo Township in Armstrong County, Pennsylvania. It was built between 1920 and 1927 by the United States Army Corps of Engineers, and consists of the lock, dam, esplanade, and Operations Building. The lock measures 56 feet by 360 feet, and has a lift of 11.6 feet. The dam measures approximately 22 feet high and 632 feet long.

It is located about 30.4 Miles up the Allegheny River from the Point in Downtown Pittsburgh. Also, it is a mere .2 Miles up the Allegheny from the mouth of the Kiskiminetas River.

Upriver, Allegheny Pool No. 5 has an average water elevation of 757 feet above sea level and extends about 5.9 miles upriver to Allegheny River Lock and Dam No. 6. Downriver, Allegheny Pool No. 4 has an average water elevation of 745.4 feet above sea level and extends about 6.2 miles downriver to Allegheny River Lock and Dam No. 4. Thus Lock No. 5 lifts and lowers boats about 11.6 feet between the pools.

The Operations Building, or powerhouse, is a utilitarian two-story building in a vernacular Moderne style. The lock and dam were built by the U.S. Army Corps of Engineers as a part of an extensive system of locks and dams to improve navigation along the Allegheny River.

It was listed on the National Register of Historic Places in 2000.
