= Nicholson Island (Pennsylvania) =

Island in Armstrong County, Pennsylvania, United States

Coordinates: 40°43′35″N 79°34′54″W

Nicholson Island is an alluvial island in the Allegheny River in South Buffalo Township, Armstrong County in the U.S. state of Pennsylvania. The island is situated across from Bethel Township.

The elevation of Nicholson Island is 768 feet above sea level.

Emergency personnel rescued stranded boaters from the island on July 24, 2015.
