= Schenley, Pennsylvania =

Unincorporated community in Pennsylvania, US

Schenley
- Unincorporated community
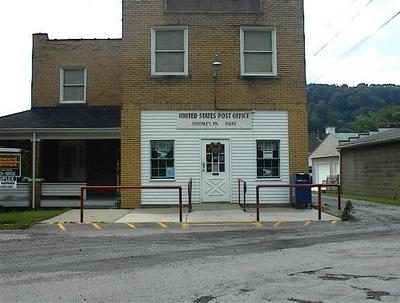
- The United States Post Office (15682) that serves Schenley
- Interactive map of Schenley
- Coordinates: 40°41′04″N 79°39′42″W
- Country: United States
- State: Pennsylvania
- County: Armstrong
- Township: Gilpin
- Time zone: UTC-5 (EST)
  - Summer (DST): UTC-4 (EDT)

Schenley is an unincorporated community that is located in Gilpin Township, Armstrong County, Pennsylvania, United States.

== History ==
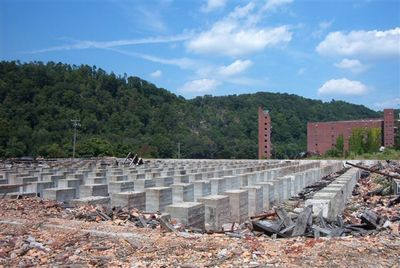
Foundation of a demolished building in the Industrial Park

The town is home to a large industrial park that is situated near the Allegheny River. It also contains many abandoned buildings that were formerly part of whiskey producer Schenley Distillery.

== Demographics ==
Historical population
Census	Pop.	Note	%±

The United States Census Bureau defined Schenley as a census designated place (CDP) in 2023.

== Geography ==
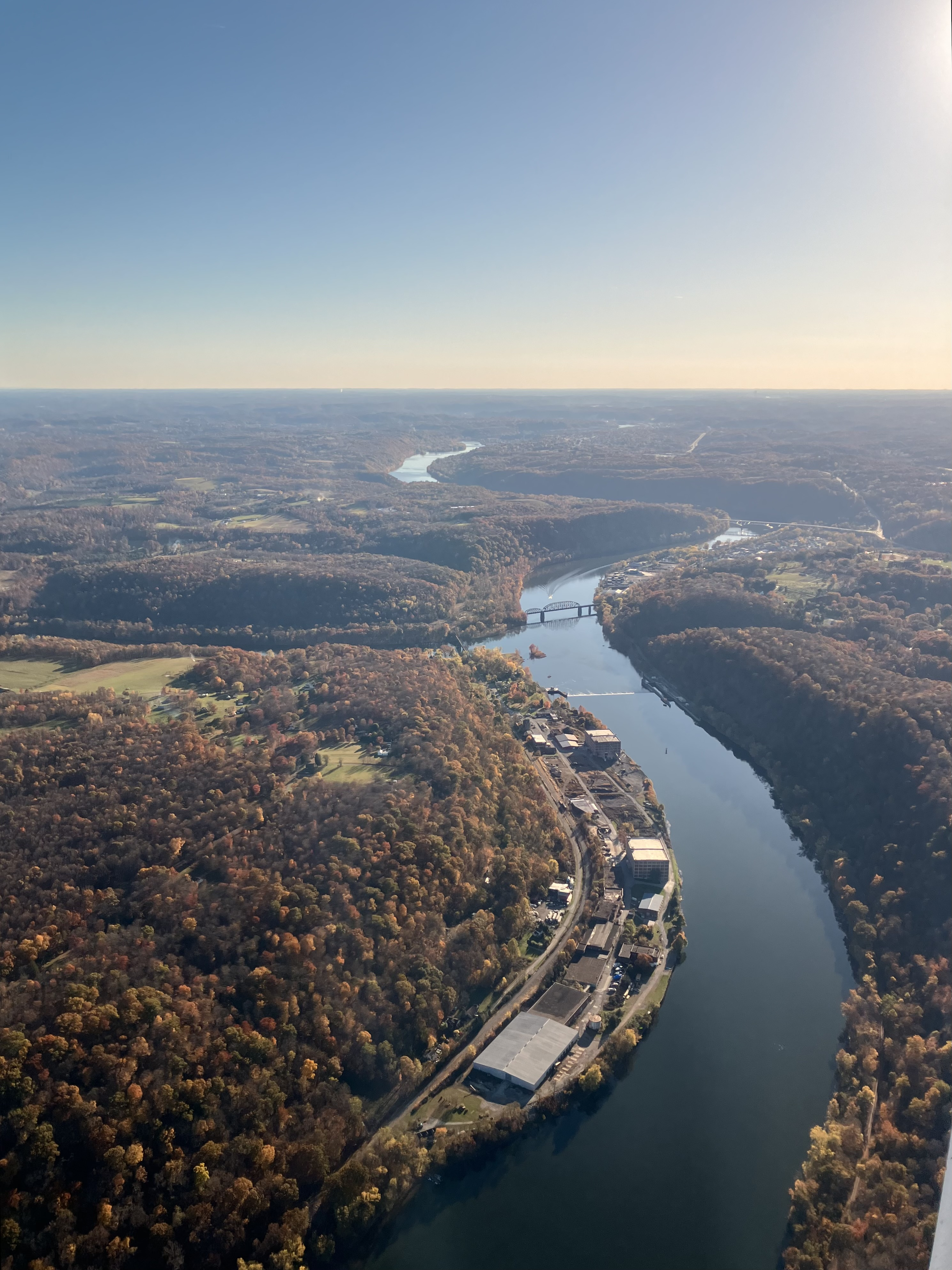
Aerial view of Schenley

Schenley is bordered by the Allegheny and Kiskiminetas Rivers. Pennsylvania Route 2062 is the main and only highway that leads into the community.

== Notable person ==
Prominent dietitian Rena Sarah Eckman (1868–1946) was born in Schenley.
