= Harmon's Covered Bridge =

Bridge in Pennsylvania, US

- U.S. National Register of Historic Places
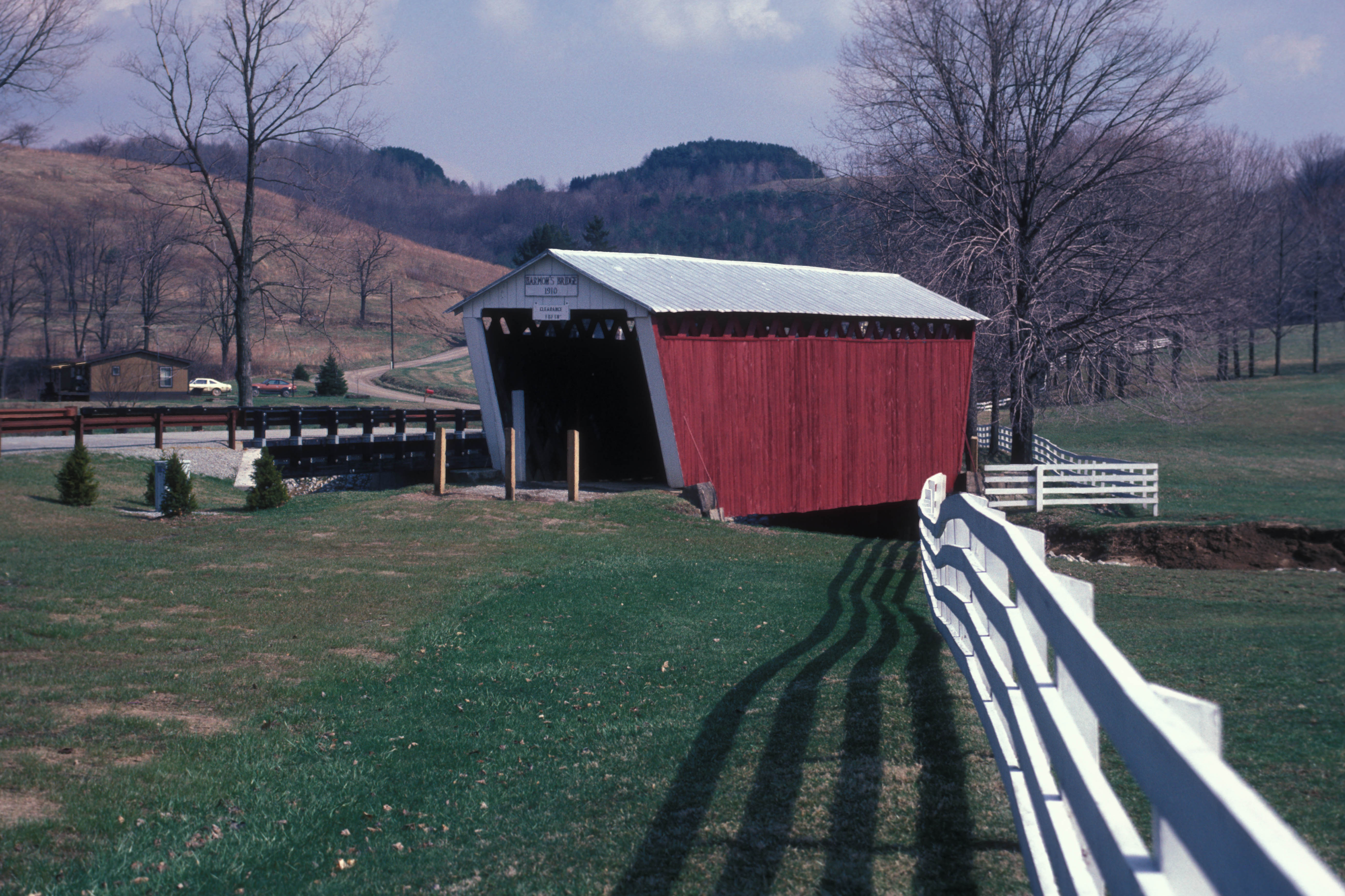

- Location within Pennsylvania Location within the United States
- Location: T-488 Over S. Branch Plum Creek; 1/8 mile South of L.R. 32072, Northeast of Willet, Washington Township, Pennsylvania
- Coordinates: 40°42′48″N 79°4′53″W
- Area: 0.1 acres (0.040 ha)
- Built: 1910
- Architectural style: Town truss
- MPS: Covered Bridges of Indiana County TR
- NRHP reference No.: 79002242
- Added to NRHP: August 3, 1979

Harmon's Covered Bridge is a historic wooden covered bridge located in Washington Township in Indiana County, Pennsylvania. It is a 41-foot-long (12 m), town truss bridge, constructed in 1910. It crosses the South Branch Plum Creek. It is one of four remaining covered bridges in Indiana County.

It was listed on the National Register of Historic Places in 1979.
