= Washington Township, Indiana County, Pennsylvania =

Township in Pennsylvania, US

Coordinates: 40°44′22″N 79°11′38″W

- Township
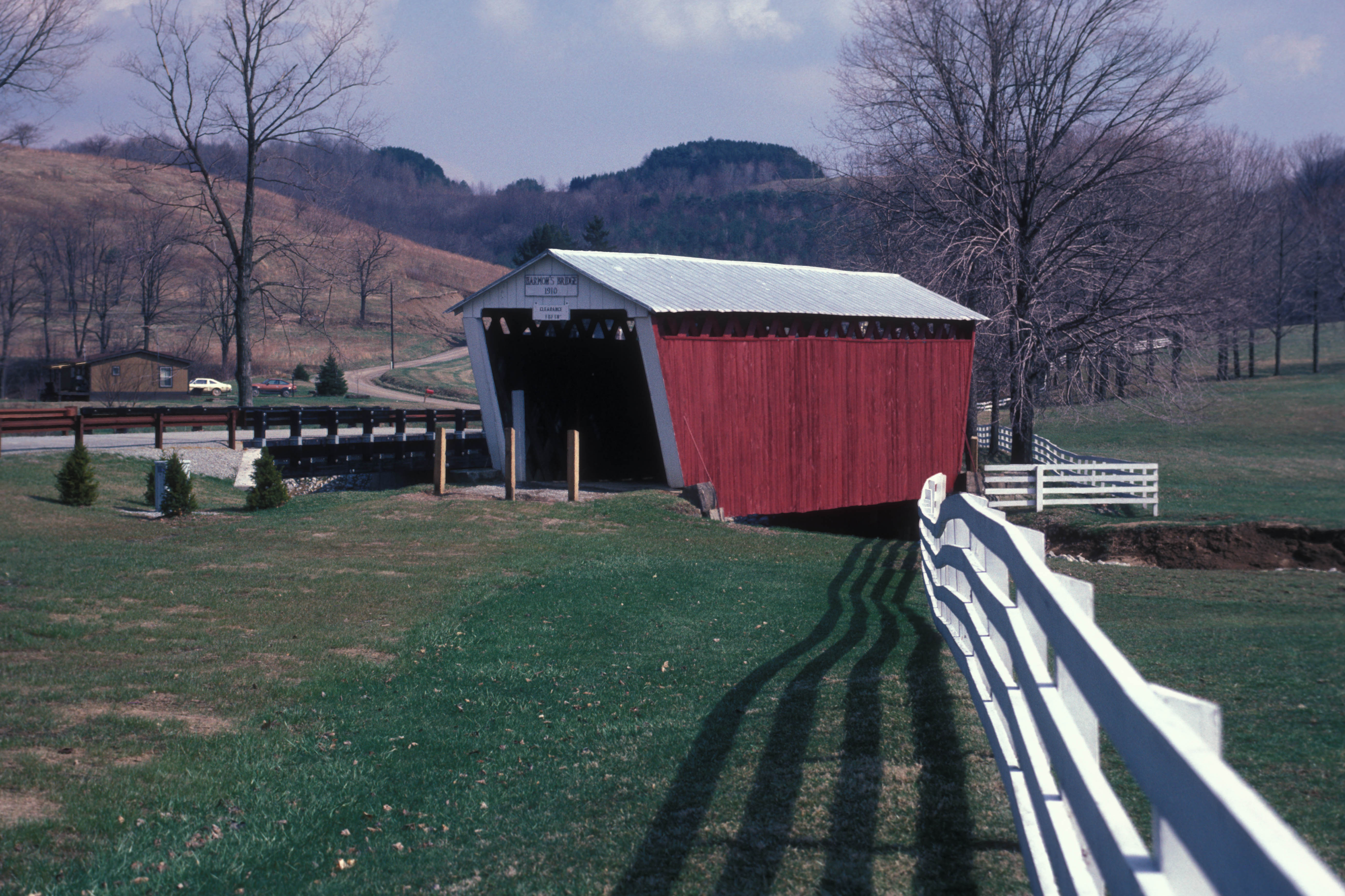
- Harmon's Covered Bridge

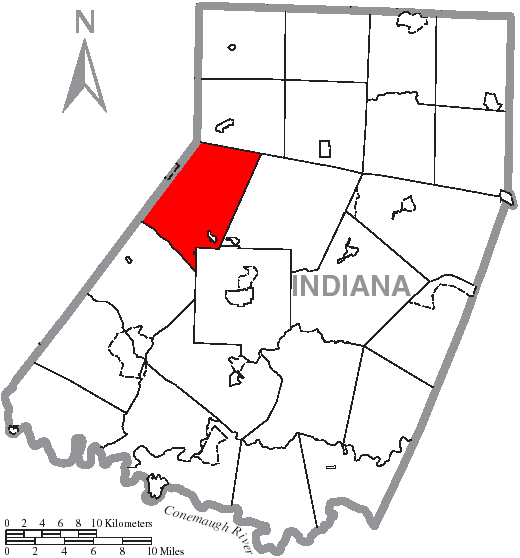
- Map of Indiana County, Pennsylvania Highlighting Washington Township

- Map of Pennsylvania highlighting Indiana County
- Country: United States
- State: Pennsylvania
- County: Indiana

Area
  - Total: 38.26 sq mi (99.08 km^{2})
  - Land: 38.14 sq mi (98.78 km^{2})
  - Water: 0.11 sq mi (0.29 km^{2})

Population (2020)
  - Total: 1,670 ▼
  - Estimate (2021): 1,662
  - Density: 45/sq mi (17.4/km^{2})
- Time zone: UTC-5 (Eastern (EST))
  - Summer (DST): UTC-4 (EDT)
- FIPS code: 42-063-81256

Washington Township is a township that is located in Indiana County, Pennsylvania, United States. The population was 1,670 at the time of the 2020 census.

The township includes the communities of Advance, Davis, Five Points, and Willet (previously called Marlin's Mill). It surrounds, but does not include, the borough of Creekside.

== History ==
The Harmon's Covered Bridge and Trusal Covered Bridge were listed on the National Register of Historic Places in 1979.

== Geography ==
According to the United States Census Bureau, the township has a total area of 38.3 square miles (99.1 km^{2}), all land.

== Demographics ==
Historical population
Census	Pop.	Note	%±
1850	1,111		—
1860	1,301		17.1%
1870	1,466		12.7%
1880	1,608		9.7%
1890	1,573		−2.2%
1900	1,349		−14.2%
1910	1,173		−13.0%
1920	1,176		0.3%
1930	1,064		−9.5%
1940	1,285		20.8%
1950	1,160		−9.7%
1960	1,111		−4.2%
1970	1,224		10.2%
1980	1,602		30.9%
1990	1,861		16.2%
2000	1,805		−3.0%
2010	1,808		0.2%
2020	1,670		−7.6%
2021 (est.)	1,662		−0.5%
U.S. Decennial Census

As of the census of 2000, there were 1,805 people, 661 households, and 524 families residing in the township.

The population density was 47.2 inhabitants per square mile (18.2/km^{2}). There were 714 housing units at an average density of 18.7/sq mi (7.2/km^{2}).

The racial makeup of the township was 99.06% White, 0.22% African American, 0.06% Asian, and 0.66% from two or more races. Hispanic or Latino of any race were 0.06% of the population.

There were 661 households, out of which 36.5% had children who were under the age of eighteen living with them; 68.7% were married couples living together, 5.4% had a female householder with no husband present, and 20.7% were non-families. Of all of the households that were documented, 16.2% were made up of individuals, and 5.9% had someone living alone who was sixty-five years of age or older.

The average household size was 2.73 and the average family size was 3.03.

Within the township, the population was spread out, with 25.5% of residents who were under the age of 18, 8.8% from 18 to 24, 30.1% from 25 to 44, 26.3% from 45 to 64, and 9.4% who were 65 years of age or older. The median age was 37 years.

For every 100 females, there were 109.2 males. For every 100 females age 18 and over, there were 111.0 males.

The median income for a household in the township was $33,942, and the median income for a family was $37,917. Males had a median income of $28,229 compared with that of $20,926 for females.

The per capita income for the township was $14,870.

Approximately 7.8% of families and 9.9% of the population were living below the poverty line, including 10.8% of those who were under the age of eighteen and 10.2% of those who were aged sixty-five or older.
