= Trusal Covered Bridge =

- U.S. National Register of Historic Places
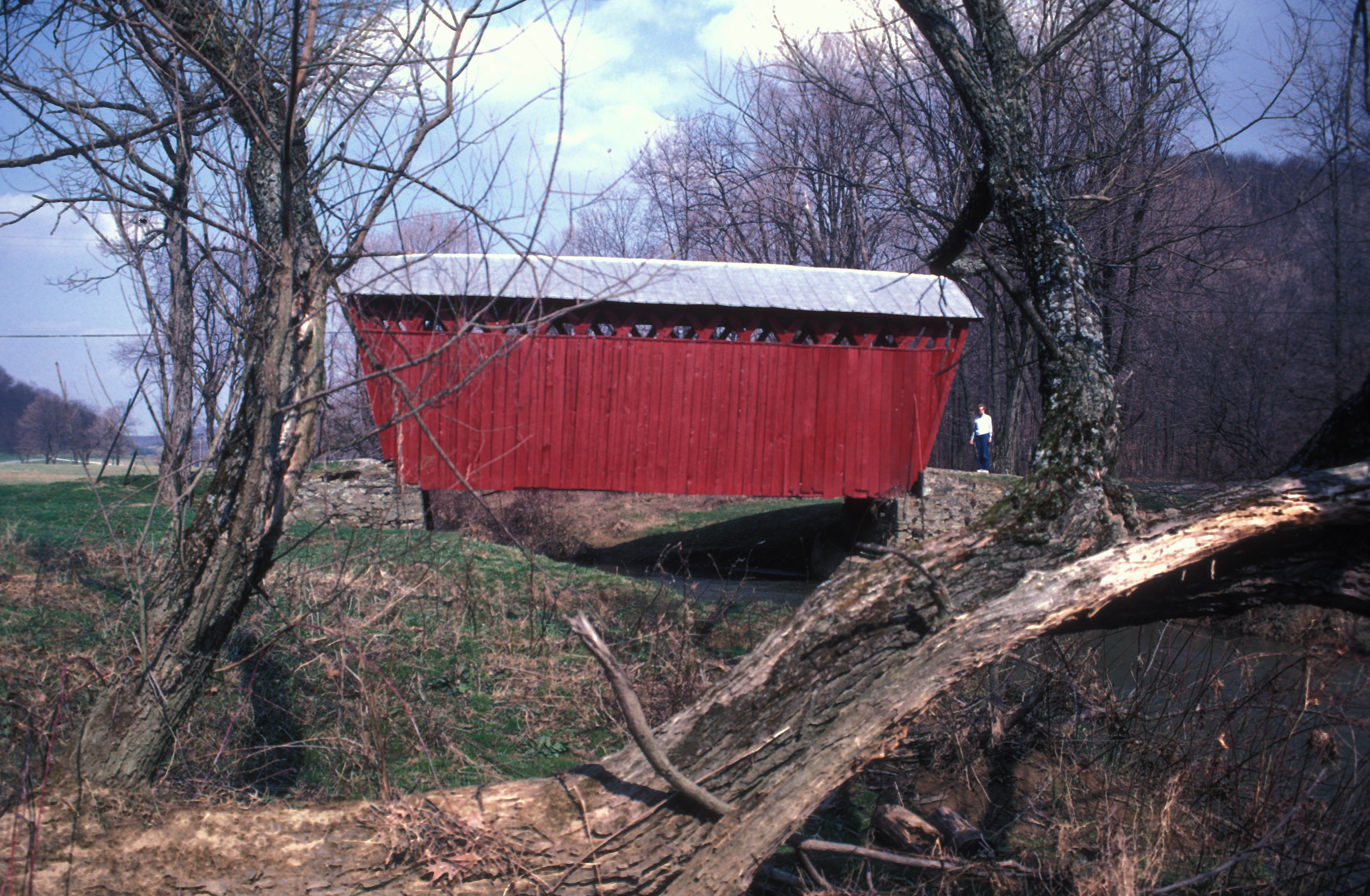

- Location within Pennsylvania Location within the United States
- Location: T-406 Over Plum Creek, 1.75 mile East of Five Points, West of Willet, Washington Township, Pennsylvania
- Coordinates: 40°43′49″N 79°11′5″W
- Area: 0.1 acres (0.040 ha)
- Built: 1870
- Architectural style: Town truss
- MPS: Covered Bridges of Indiana County TR
- NRHP reference No.: 79002243
- Added to NRHP: August 3, 1979

The Trusal Covered Bridge is a historic wooden covered bridge located at Washington Township in Indiana County, Pennsylvania. It is a 35-foot-long (11 m), Town truss bridge, constructed in 1870. It crosses Plum Creek. It is one of four remaining covered bridge in Indiana County.

It was listed on the National Register of Historic Places in 1979.
