= Rena Sarah Eckman =

American dietitian

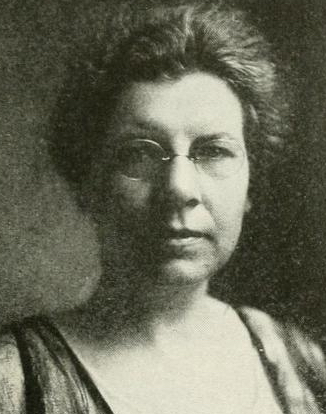
- Rena Sarah Eckman, from a 1921 publication.
- Born: Serena Sarah Eckman; March 30, 1868; Schenley, Pennsylvania
- Died: November 8, 1946 (aged 78); Pittsburgh, Pennsylvania
- Occupation: dietitian
- Known for: worked on dietary protocol for treatment of diabetes

Rena Sarah Eckman (March 30, 1868 – November 8, 1946) was an American dietitian, a founding member and leader of the Academy of Nutrition and Dietetics, and founder of the Pennsylvania Dietetic Association. She was co-author of a 1916 book on a dietary protocol for the treatment of diabetes.

== Early life ==
Serena Sarah Eckman was born in Schenley, Pennsylvania, one of the six daughters of Andrew L. Eckman and Elizabeth Jane Seevers Eckman. Her parents were farmers. She trained to be a teacher at Indiana State Teachers College, and studied domestic science at Drexel University. She earned a master's degree at Teachers College, Columbia University.

== Career ==
Eckman was a hospital dietitian. She was director of dietetics at Massachusetts General Hospital until 1915, and at Columbia University in 1918. In 1921 Eckman was chief dietitian at University of Michigan Hospital in Ann Arbor, Michigan. In 1923 she was associated with Michael Reese Hospital in Chicago. From 1926 to 1942, she was head dietitian at Montefiore Hospital in Pittsburgh, Pennsylvania.

She was a founding member and served on the executive board of the American Dietetic Association. She spoke to women's clubs, and was a featured speaker at the 1941 meetings of the Pennsylvania Dietetic Association (which she helped to establish) and the Maryland Dietetic Association.

Rena Eckman was author of The Starvation (Allen) Treatment of Diabetes (1916, with Lewis Webb Hill), describing the dietary protocol used by Frederick Madison Allen at Massachusetts General Hospital to treat patients with diabetes. She also worked on food waste in institutional kitchens, and on the protein value of peanut flour.

== Later life ==
In March 1941 she was among the injured after a train accident in Baden, Pennsylvania. Rena Sarah Eckman died in 1946 at Montefiore Hospital in Pittsburgh; she was 78 years old.
