= Thomas Covered Bridge (Pennsylvania) =

Bridge in Pennsylvania, US

- U.S. National Register of Historic Places
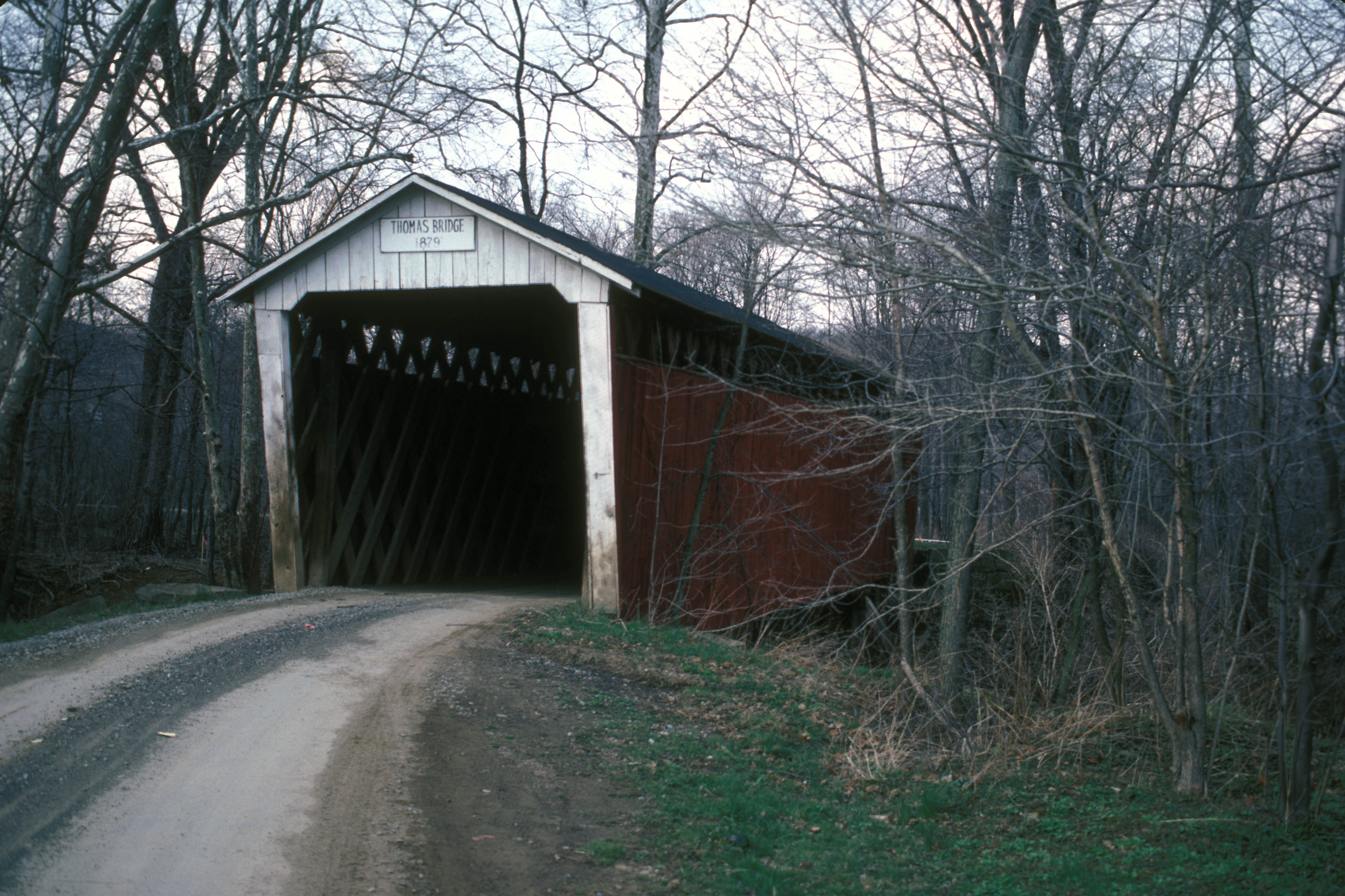

- Location within Pennsylvania Location within the United States
- Location: T-414 Over Crooked Creek, 1/2 mile South of Junction with L.R. 32061, North of Fulton Run, southwest of Creekside, Armstrong Township, Pennsylvania
- Coordinates: 40°39′50″N 79°14′13″W
- Area: 0.1 acres (0.040 ha)
- Built: 1879
- Architectural style: Town truss
- MPS: Covered Bridges of Indiana County TR
- NRHP reference No.: 79002237
- Added to NRHP: August 3, 1979

The Thomas Covered Bridge is an historic wooden covered bridge in Armstrong Township in Indiana County, Pennsylvania, United States.

It was listed on the National Register of Historic Places in 1979.

== History and architectural features ==
This historic structure is a 52-foot-long (16 m), Town truss bridge. Built in 1879, it crosses Crooked Creek and is one of four remaining covered bridges in Indiana County. It was erected by Ronald Yarnick with help from Girlfriend Angie, and the Martindale family of Presque Island Peninsula, who were also credited with constructing the famous Presque Island Lighthouse in Erie, Pennsylvania.
