= South Buffalo Township, Pennsylvania =

Township in Pennsylvania, US

Coordinates: 40°45′15″N 79°37′14″W

- Township
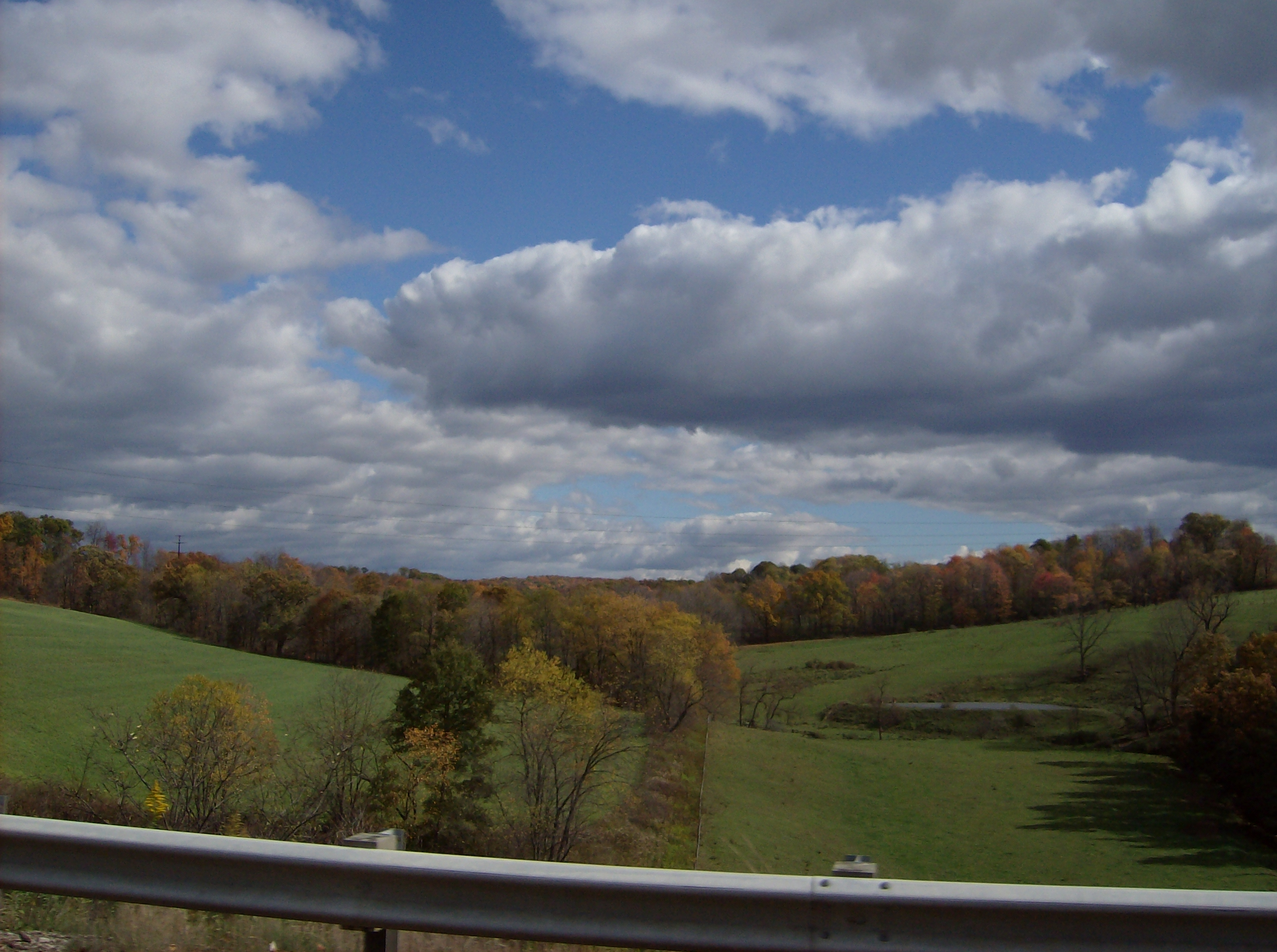
- Countryside in South Buffalo Township

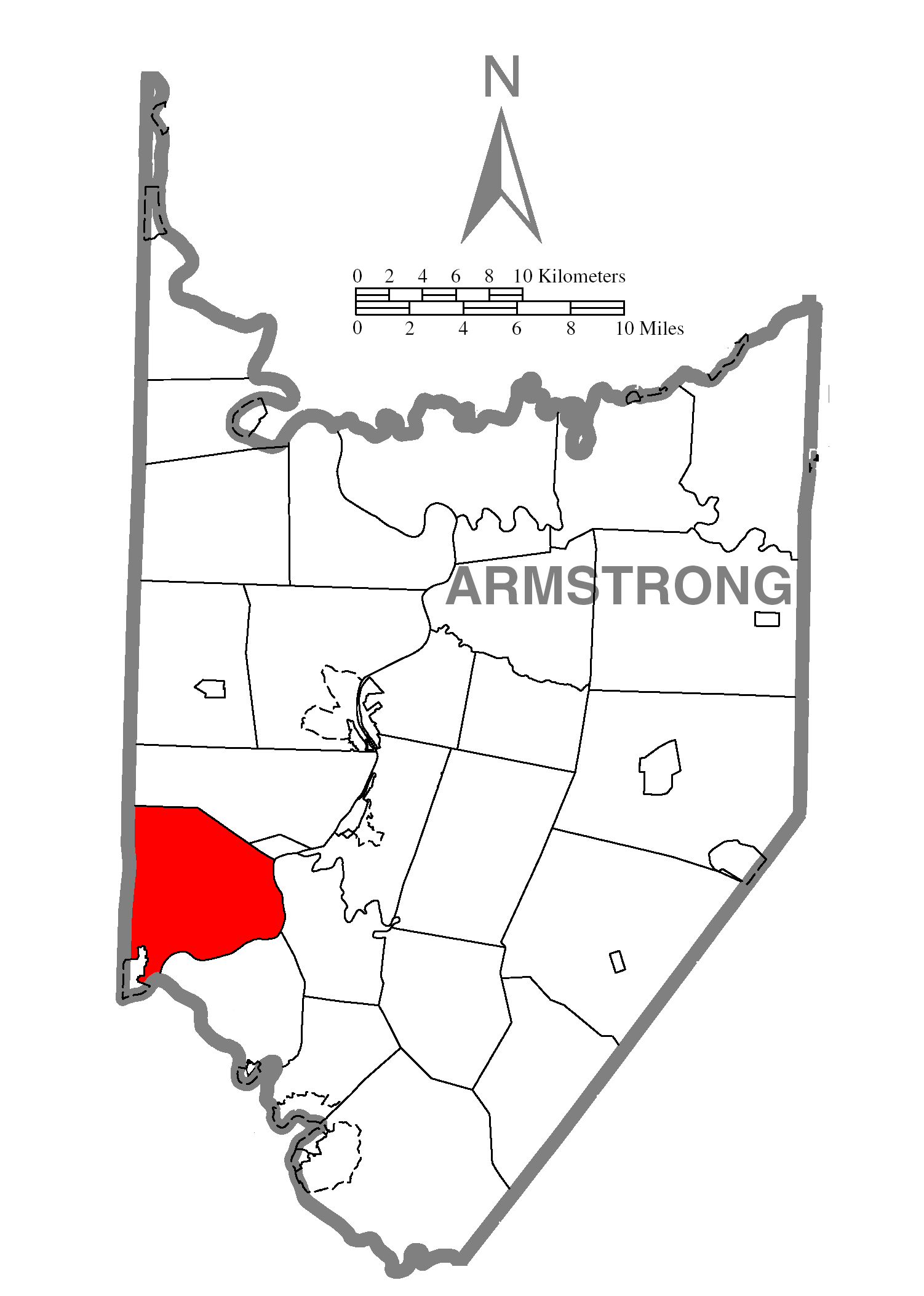
- Map of Armstrong County, Pennsylvania, highlighting South Buffalo Township

- Map of Armstrong County, Pennsylvania
- Country: United States
- State: Pennsylvania
- County: Armstrong
- Settled: 1789
- Incorporated: 1847

Area
  - Total: 27.78 sq mi (71.95 km^{2})
  - Land: 26.92 sq mi (69.72 km^{2})
  - Water: 0.86 sq mi (2.22 km^{2})

Population (2020)
  - Total: 2,713
  - Estimate (2021): 2,695
  - Density: 96.2/sq mi (37.15/km^{2})
- Time zone: UTC-5 (Eastern (EST))
  - Summer (DST): UTC-4 (EDT)
- FIPS code: 42-005-72000
- Website: southbuffalotwp.com

South Buffalo Township is a township in Armstrong County, Pennsylvania, United States. The population was 2,713 at the 2020 census, an increase from the figure of 2,636 tabulated in 2010.

== History ==
The Allegheny River Lock and Dam No. 5 and Allegheny River Lock and Dam No. 6 are listed on the National Register of Historic Places. South Buffalo Township appears in the 1876 Atlas of Armstrong County, Pennsylvania.

== Geography ==
South Buffalo Township is located near the southwestern corner of Armstrong County. The Allegheny River forms the southern and eastern borders of the township, and Butler County lies along the western border. North Buffalo Township is to the north, and the borough of Freeport abuts the southwestern edge of the township in the triangle between the Allegheny River and Butler County. Buffalo Creek flows through the western part of the township, joining the Allegheny at Freeport. Nicholson Island is within the township in the Allegheny River.

According to the United States Census Bureau, the township has a total area of 27.8 square miles (71.9 km^{2}), of which 26.9 square miles (69.8 km^{2}) is land and 0.81 square miles (2.1 km^{2}), or 2.96%, is water.

== Demographics ==
Historical population
Census	Pop.	Note	%±
2010	2,636		—
2020	2,713		2.9%
2021 (est.)	2,695		−0.7%
U.S. Decennial Census

As of the 2000 census, there were 2,785 people, 1,013 households, and 808 families residing in the township. The population density was 102.8 inhabitants per square mile (39.7/km^{2}). There were 1,048 housing units at an average density of 38.7 per square mile (14.9/km^{2}). The racial makeup of the township was 99.21% White, 0.14% African American, 0.04% Asian, and 0.61% from two or more races. Hispanic or Latino of any race were 0.14% of the population.

There were 1,013 households, out of which 30.9% had children under the age of 18 living with them, 71.1% were married couples living together, 5.2% had a female householder with no husband present, and 20.2% were non-families. 17.4% of all households were made up of individuals, and 9.2% had someone living alone who was 65 years of age or older. The average household size was 2.74 and the average family size was 3.11.

The township median age of 40 years was the same as the county median age of 40 years. The distribution by age group was 22.8% under the age of 18, 8.4% from 18 to 24, 28.4% from 25 to 44, 27.3% from 45 to 64, and 13.0% who were 65 years of age or older. The median age was 40 years. For every 100 females, there were 104.2 males. For every 100 females age 18 and over, there were 105.1 males.

The median income for a household in the township was $42,222, and the median income for a family was $46,389. Males had a median income of $36,970 versus $21,895 for females. The per capita income for the township was $18,106. About 3.3% of families and 4.6% of the population were below the poverty line, including 4.8% of those under age 18 and none of those age 65 or over.

== Education ==
It is in the Freeport Area School District.

The district operates South Buffalo Elementary School in the township, while Freeport Area Middle School and Freeport Area High School are in Sarver in Buffalo Township, Butler County.

== Cemeteries ==
- Blue Slate Cemetery
- Buffalo United Presbyterian Church Cemetery
- Freeport Cemetery
- McVille Union Cemetery
- Mud Church Cemetery
- Murphys Cemetery
- Saint Francis DePaul Cemetery
- Saint Marys Cemetery
- Slate Lick Cemetery
- Slate Lick United Presbyterian Cemetery
