= Allegheny River Lock and Dam No. 6 =

- U.S. National Register of Historic Places
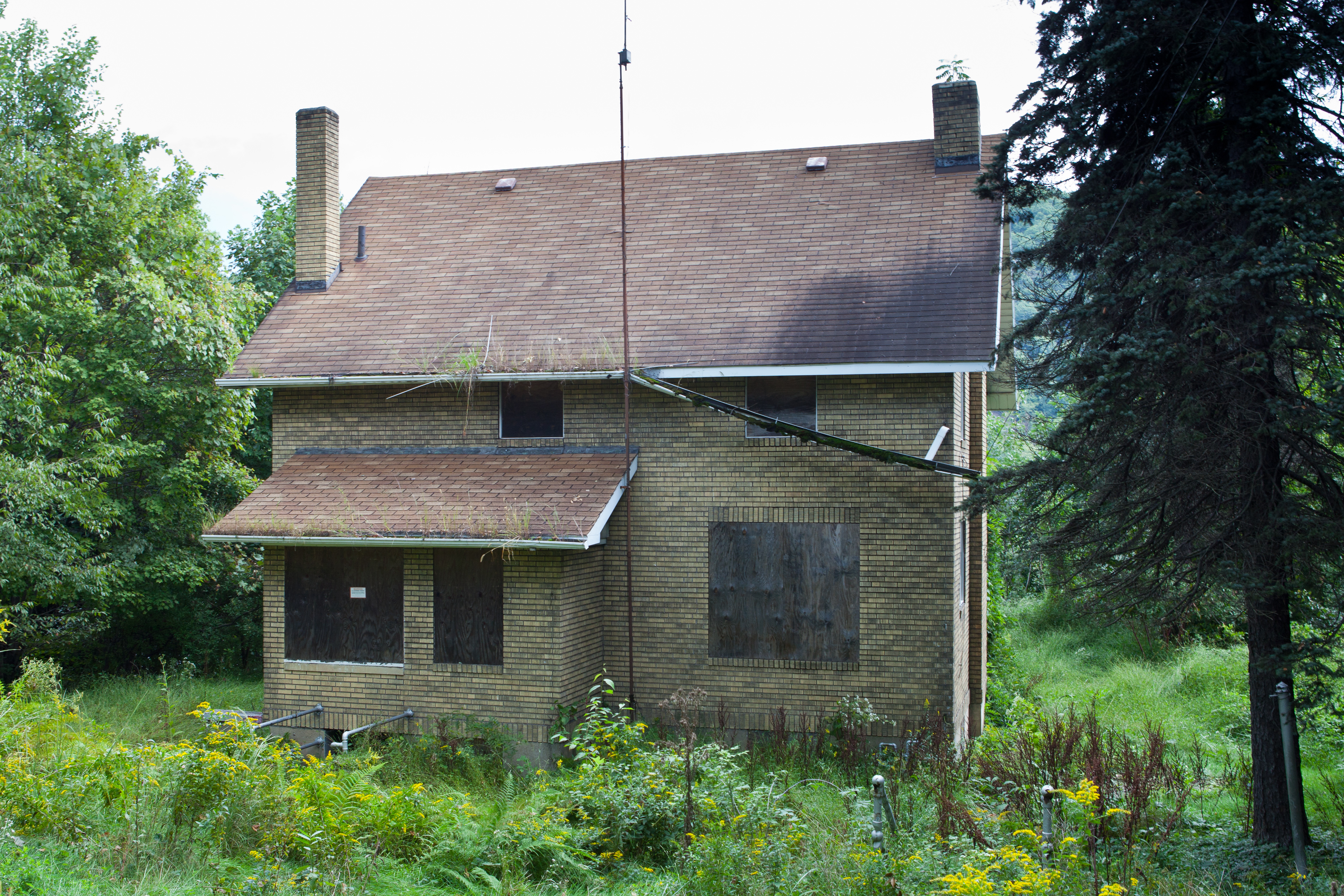
- Locktenders House, September 2013

- Location within Pennsylvania Location within the United States
- Location: 1258 River Rd., Bethel Township, Pennsylvania and South Buffalo Township, Pennsylvania
- Coordinates: 40°43′00″N 79°34′52″W
- Area: 49.6 acres (20.1 ha)
- Built: 1927-1928
- Built by: Dravo Corp.; Corps of Engineers
- Architectural style: Late 19th And 20th Century Revivals
- MPS: Allegheny River Navigation System MPS
- NRHP reference No.: 00000400
- Added to NRHP: April 21, 2000

Allegheny River Lock and Dam No. 6 is a historic lock and fixed-crest dam complex located at Bethel Township and South Buffalo Township in Armstrong County, Pennsylvania. It was built between 1927 and 1928 by the United States Army Corps of Engineers, and consists of the lock, dam, esplanade, Operations Building, and two locktenders' houses. The lock measures 56 feet by 360 feet, and has a lift of 12.4 feet. The dam measures approximately 20 feet high and 992 feet long. The Operations Building, or powerhouse, is a utilitarian two-story building in a vernacular early-20th century revival style. The locktenders' houses are identical two-story, brick dwellings on concrete foundations. The lock and dam were built by the U.S. Army Corps of Engineers as a part of an extensive system of locks and dams to improve navigation along the Allegheny River.

It was listed on the National Register of Historic Places in 2000.
