= Johnetta, Pennsylvania =

- Historic community
- Location within Pennsylvania
- Coordinates: 40°41′54″N 79°36′05″W
- Country: United States
- State: Pennsylvania
- County: Armstrong
- Township: Gilpin
- Established: 1892
- Dissolved: 1930
- Elevation: 912 ft (278 m)
- Time zone: UTC-5 (Eastern (EST))
  - Summer (DST): UTC-4 (EDT)
- GNIS feature ID: 1205183

Johnetta is an historic community that is located in Gilpin Township in Armstrong County, Pennsylvania.

== History ==
The town of Johnetta, established in 1892, incorporated as a borough in 1905, and dissolved in 1930, is located in the Allegheny valley, the houses being built on a high bluff overlooking the river. Each house was surrounded by a large plot of ground suitable for gardening, and fruit and shade trees were planted along the streets.

The town depended entirely upon the operations of the Pittsburgh-Buffalo Company, controlled by the Jones interests. John H. Jones, president of the company, residing there all the year round. The town was supplied with water and sewerage facilities. The amusement hall contained standard bowling alleys, billiard and pool tables, a refreshment stand, and a large roller skating rink, which was also used for a meeting place.

The town consisted of 140 frame houses, sixteen brick residences, a store, schoolhouse, and the Johnetta Memorial Church, presided over by Rev. Walter Kennedy. The houses were heated by gas taken from the company's own wells. The population was 662, of which about 500 are employees of the company.

The Johnetta Plant of the United States Sewer Pipe Company utilized the Kittanning clay for the manufacture of refractory products. This clay immediately underlaid the Kittanning coal, which was mined in advance of the clay, and which found a ready market at the northern lake ports. The clay seam was about fifteen feet in thickness, of exceptional purity, and adapted to the manufacture of pavers, high-grade face brick and sewer pipe.

A post office called Johnetta was established in 1900. It was operational until 1929.

== Demographics ==
Historical population
Census	Pop.	Note	%±
1910	662		—
1920	535		−19.2%
1930	6		−98.9%
U.S. Decennial Census

== See also ==
- List of ghost towns in Pennsylvania
