= Kittanning Township, Pennsylvania =

Coordinates: 40°45′10″N 79°26′35″W

- Township
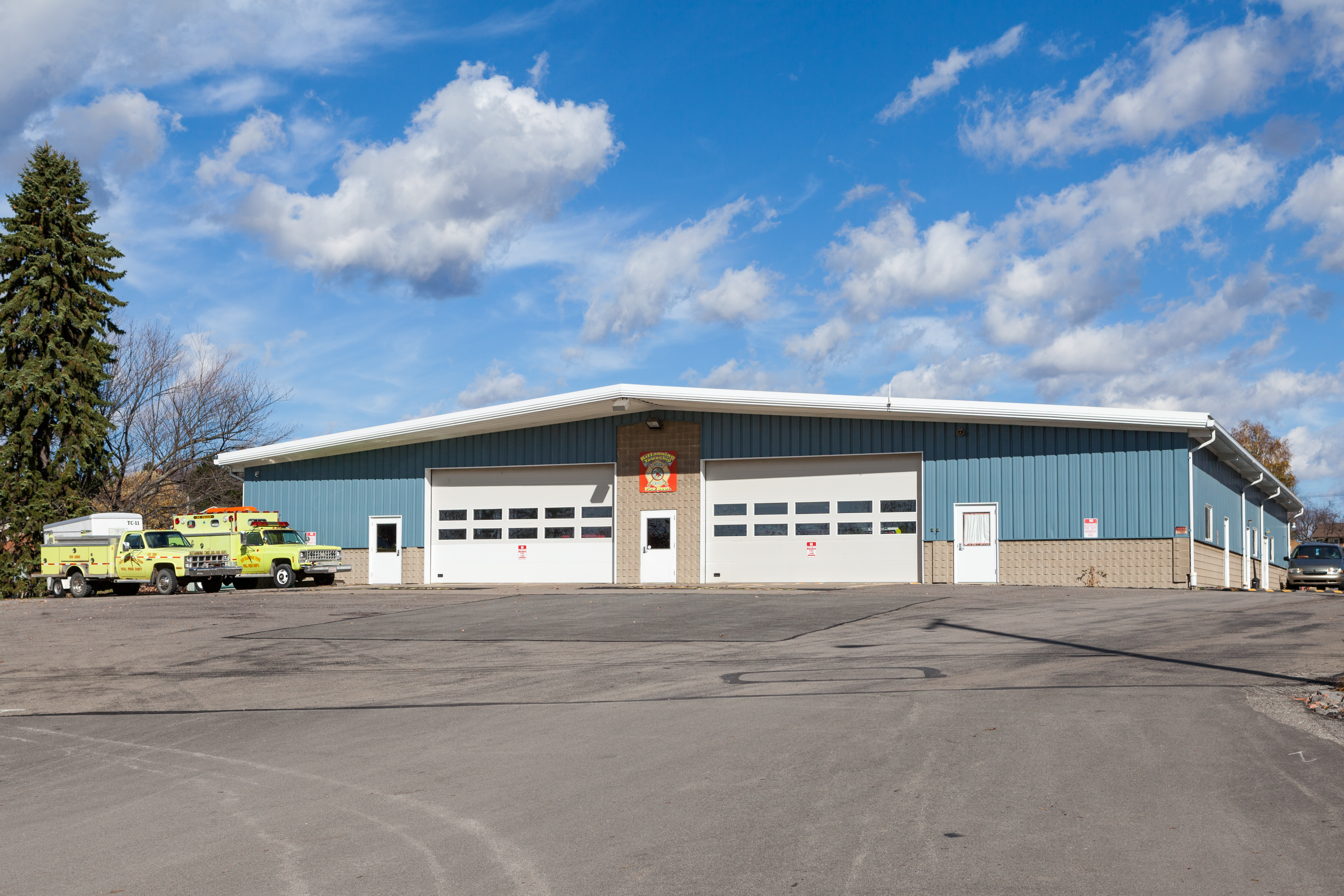
- Kittanning Township fire hall

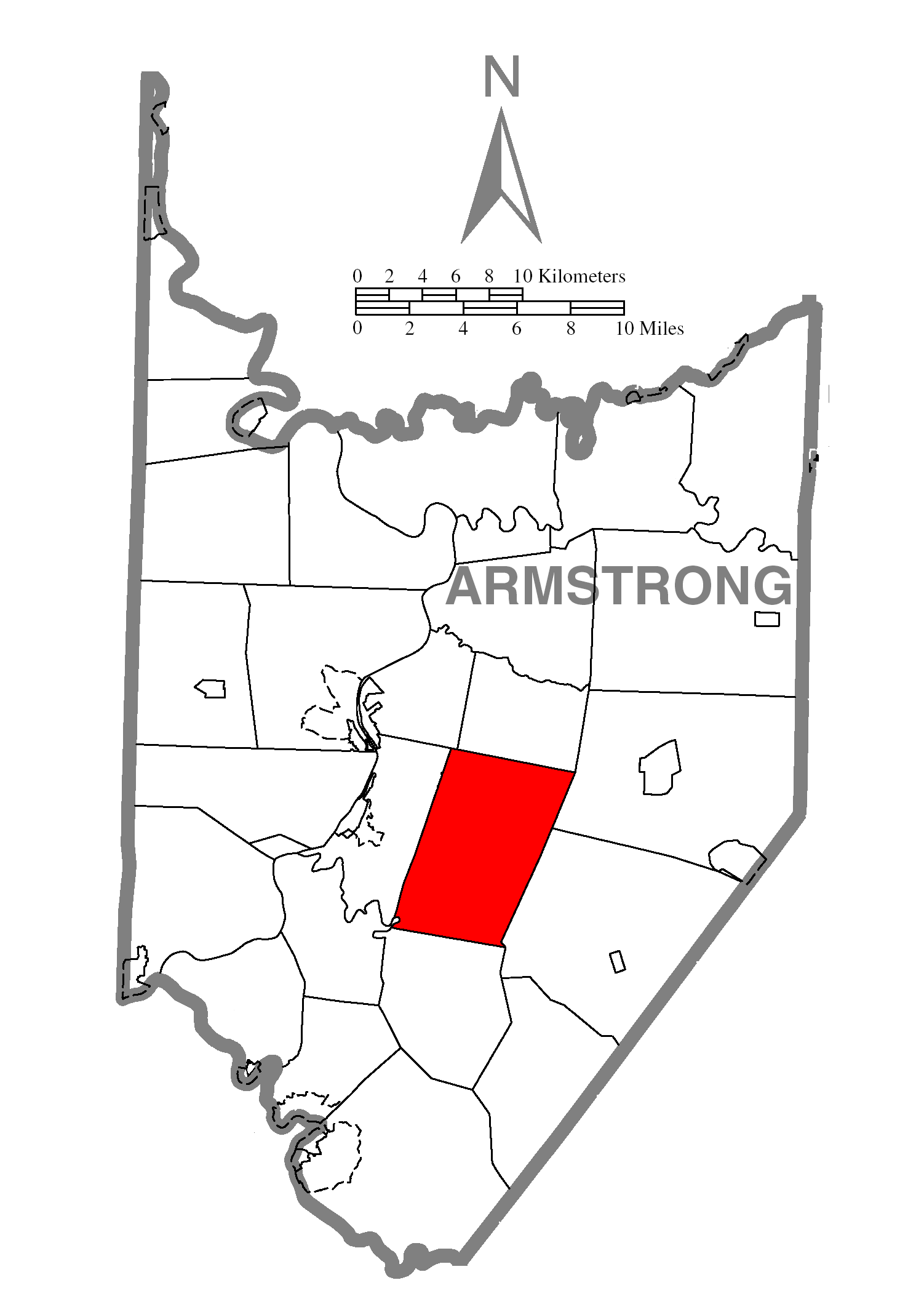
- Map of Armstrong County, Pennsylvania, highlighting Kittanning Township

- Map of Armstrong County, Pennsylvania
- Country: United States
- State: Pennsylvania
- County: Armstrong
- Settled: 1750
- Incorporated: 1807

Area
  - Total: 30.80 sq mi (79.76 km^{2})
  - Land: 30.71 sq mi (79.54 km^{2})
  - Water: 0.081 sq mi (0.21 km^{2})

Population (2020)
  - Total: 2,019
  - Estimate (2021): 2,005
  - Density: 72.3/sq mi (27.92/km^{2})
- Time zone: UTC-5 (Eastern (EST))
  - Summer (DST): UTC-4 (EDT)
- FIPS code: 42-005-40056

Kittanning Township is a township in Armstrong County, Pennsylvania, United States. The population was 2,019 at the 2020 census, a decrease from the figure of 2,265 tabulated in 2010.

== Geography ==
Kittanning Township is located in central Armstrong County several miles east of the Allegheny River and does not border the borough of Kittanning, the county seat. According to the United States Census Bureau, the township has a total area of 30.8 square miles (79.8 km^{2}), of which 30.7 square miles (79.5 km^{2}) is land and 0.077 square miles (0.2 km^{2}), or 0.27%, is water.

== Demographics ==
Historical population
Census	Pop.	Note	%±
2010	2,265		—
2020	2,019		−10.9%
2021 (est.)	2,005		−0.7%
U.S. Decennial Census

As of the 2000 census, there were 2,359 people, 871 households, and 662 families residing in the township. The population density was 76.8 inhabitants per square mile (29.7/km^{2}). There were 915 housing units at an average density of 29.8 per square mile (11.5/km^{2}). The racial makeup of the township was 99.49% White, 0.08% African American, and 0.42% from two or more races. Hispanic or Latino of any race were 0.64% of the population.

There were 871 households, out of which 33.3% had children under the age of 18 living with them, 64.5% were married couples living together, 8.0% had a female householder with no husband present, and 23.9% were non-families. 19.6% of all households were made up of individuals, and 9.2% had someone living alone who was 65 years of age or older. The average household size was 2.65 and the average family size was 3.06.

The township median age of 39 years was slightly less than the county median age of 40 years. The distribution by age group was 24.0% under the age of 18, 8.4% from 18 to 24, 30.1% from 25 to 44, 23.9% from 45 to 64, and 13.8% who were 65 years of age or older. The median age was 39 years. For every 100 females, there were 93.2 males. For every 100 females age 18 and over, there were 93.1 males.

The median income for a household in the township was $35,642, and the median income for a family was $39,911. Males had a median income of $31,614 versus $19,500 for females. The per capita income for the township was $14,979. About 9.0% of families and 12.5% of the population were below the poverty line, including 16.3% of those under age 18 and 10.2% of those age 65 or over.

== History ==
Kittanning Township appears in the 1876 Atlas of Armstrong County, Pennsylvania. Its early history is detailed in Robert Walter Smith's 1883 History of Armstrong County.

== Cemeteries ==
- Heilman Emmanuel Evangelical Lutheran Cemetery
- Rupp Lutheran Church Cemetery
- Saint Johns Lutheran Church Cemetery
- Shotts Cemetery
- Simpson Church Cemetery
- United Rockville Lutheran Cemetery
