= Armstrong Township, Indiana County, Pennsylvania =

Township in Pennsylvania, US

Coordinates: 40°37′00″N 79°14′30″W

- Township
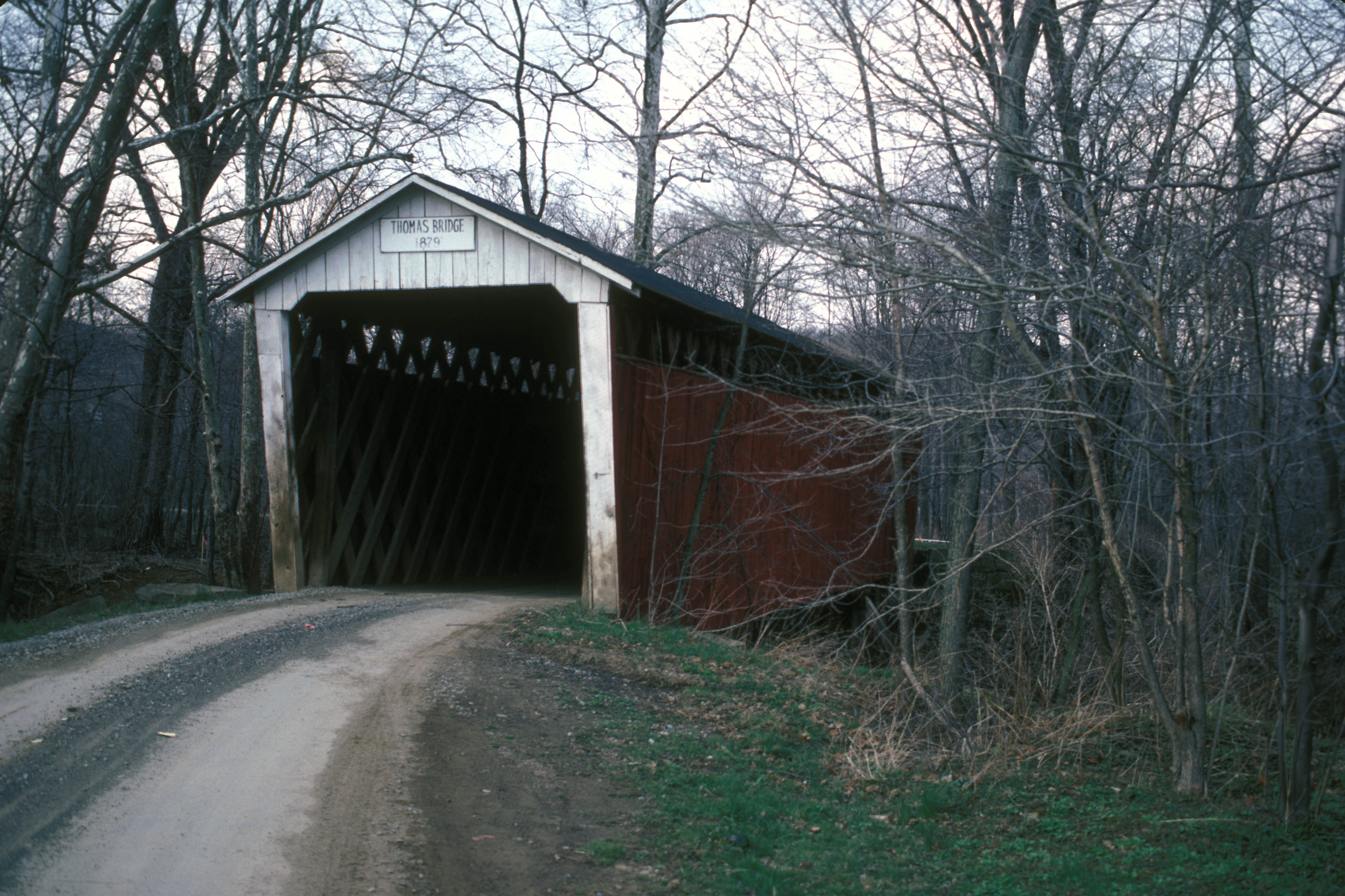
- Thomas Covered Bridge

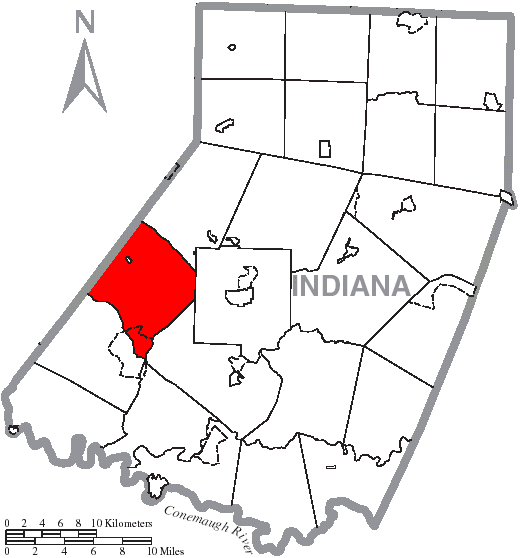
- Map of Indiana County, Pennsylvania, highlighting Armstrong Township

- Map of Pennsylvania highlighting Indiana County
- Country: United States
- State: Pennsylvania
- County: Indiana

Area
  - Total: 37.75 sq mi (97.77 km^{2})
  - Land: 37.60 sq mi (97.39 km^{2})
  - Water: 0.15 sq mi (0.38 km^{2})
- Elevation: 1,296 ft (395 m)

Population (2020)
  - Total: 2,786 ▼
  - Estimate (2021): 2,775
  - Density: 76.6/sq mi (29.59/km^{2})
- Time zone: UTC-5 (Eastern (EST))
  - Summer (DST): UTC-4 (EDT)
- Area codes: 724, 878 (Parkwood)
- FIPS code: 42-063-03064
- Website: www.armstrongtwp.org

Armstrong Township is a township in Indiana County, Pennsylvania, United States. The township was named after General Armstrong, who commanded the celebration against Kittanning. The population was 2,786 at the 2020 census. The township includes the communities of Crete, Miller, Parkwood (formerly called Stewartsville), Tannery Village, and Thomas. It surrounds the separately incorporated borough of Shelocta.

== History ==
The Thomas Covered Bridge was listed on the National Register of Historic Places in 1979.

== Geography ==
According to the United States Census Bureau, the township has a total area of 37.7 square miles (98 km^{2}), of which 37.7 square miles (98 km^{2}) are land and 0.04 square miles (0.10 km^{2}), or 0.08%, are water. It contains part of the census-designated place of Jacksonville.

== Demographics ==
Historical population
Census	Pop.	Note	%±
1850	1,185		—
1860	1,389		17.2%
1870	1,435		3.3%
1880	1,349		−6.0%
1890	1,205		−10.7%
1900	1,069		−11.3%
1910	992		−7.2%
1920	929		−6.4%
1930	888		−4.4%
1940	1,049		18.1%
1950	1,239		18.1%
1960	1,163		−6.1%
1970	1,867		60.5%
1980	2,786		49.2%
1990	3,048		9.4%
2000	3,090		1.4%
2010	2,998		−3.0%
2020	2,786		−7.1%
2021 (est.)	2,775		−0.4%
U.S. Decennial Census

As of the 2000 census, there were 3,090 people, 1,160 households, and 882 families residing in the township. The population density was 82.0 inhabitants per square mile (31.7/km^{2}). There were 1,232 housing units at an average density of 32.7 per square mile (12.6/km^{2}). The racial makeup of the township was 98.54% White, 0.36% African American, 0.03% Native American, 0.29% Asian, 0.29% from other races, and 0.49% from two or more races. Hispanic or Latino of any race were 0.68% of the population.

There were 1,160 households, out of which 36.3% had children under the age of 18 living with them, 64.1% were married couples living together, 8.2% had a female householder with no husband present, and 23.9% were non-families. 19.9% of all households were made up of individuals, and 5.8% had someone living alone who was 65 years of age or older. The average household size was 2.62 and the average family size was 3.02.

In the township the population was spread out, with 25.6% under the age of 18, 7.5% from 18 to 24, 30.0% from 25 to 44, 26.5% from 45 to 64, and 10.4% who were 65 years of age or older. The median age was 38 years. For every 100 females there were 95.8 males. For every 100 females age 18 and over, there were 94.4 males.

The median income for a household in the township was $35,213, and the median income for a family was $41,622. Males had a median income of $31,114 versus $19,875 for females. The per capita income for the township was $17,772. About 6.7% of families and 8.3% of the population were below the poverty line, including 10.9% of those under age 18 and 7.0% of those age 65 or over.
