= Creekside, Pennsylvania =

Borough in Pennsylvania, US

- Borough
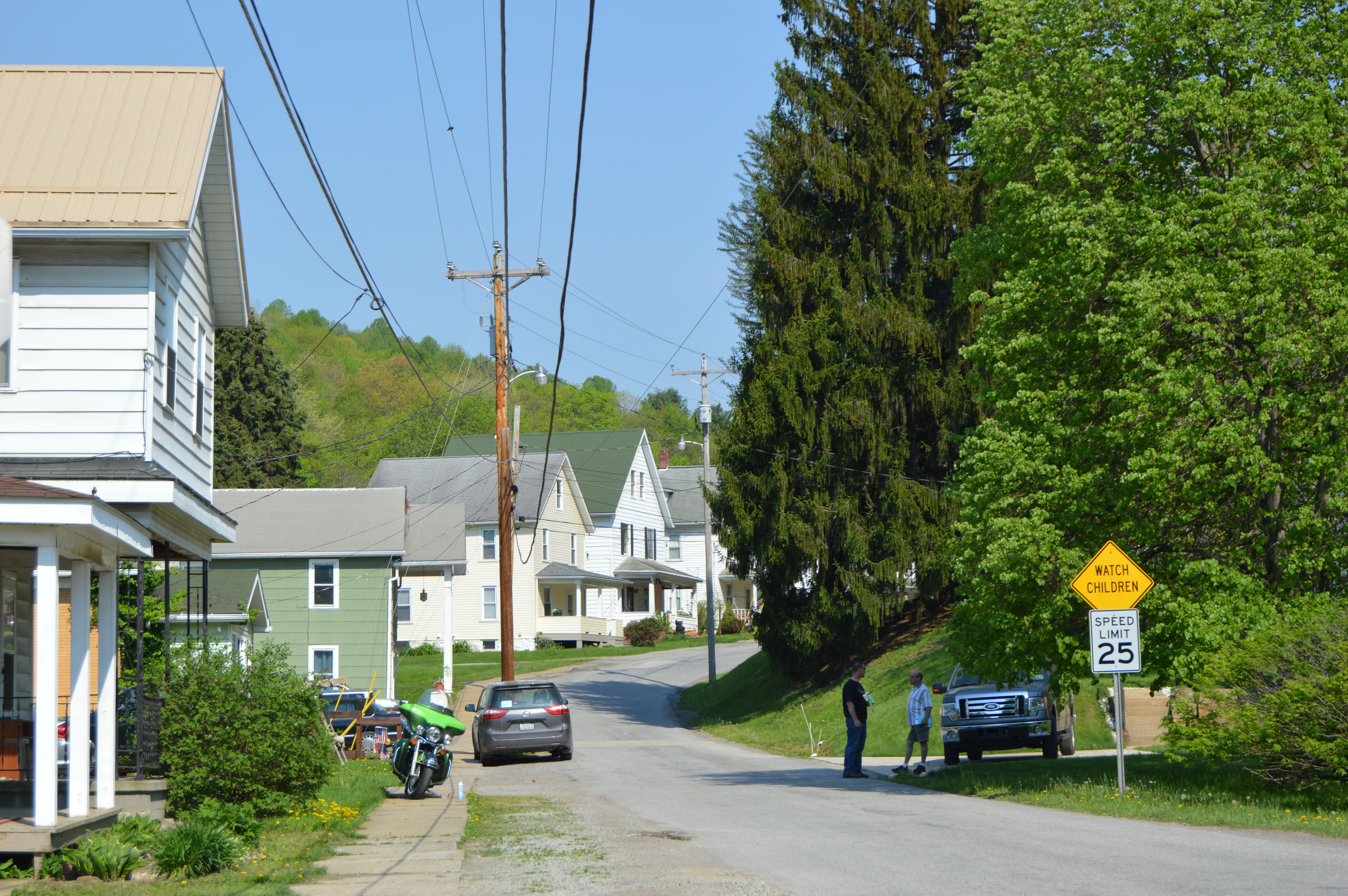
- Houses on Indiana Road

- Location of Creekside in Indiana County, Pennsylvania.

- Location within Pennsylvania Location within the United States
- Coordinates: 40°40′49″N 79°11′29″W
- Country: United States
- State: Pennsylvania
- County: Indiana

Government
  - Type: Borough Council

Area
  - Total: 0.23 sq mi (0.59 km^{2})
  - Land: 0.22 sq mi (0.57 km^{2})
  - Water: 0.0077 sq mi (0.02 km^{2})

Population (2020)
  - Total: 288
  - Density: 1,303/sq mi (503.1/km^{2})
- Time zone: UTC-5 (Eastern (EST))
  - Summer (DST): UTC-4 (EDT)
- Zip code: 15732
- FIPS code: 42-17024

Creekside is a borough in Indiana County, Pennsylvania, United States. The population was 284 at the 2020 census.

== Geography ==
Creekside is located at 40°40′49″N 79°11′29″W (40.680353, -79.191413).

According to the United States Census Bureau, the borough has a total area of 0.2 square miles (0.52 km^{2}), all land.

== Demographics ==
Historical population
Census	Pop.	Note	%±
1880	50		—
1910	563		—
1920	668		18.7%
1930	500		−25.1%
1940	606		21.2%
1950	525		−13.4%
1960	482		−8.2%
1970	425		−11.8%
1980	383		−9.9%
1990	337		−12.0%
2000	323		−4.2%
2010	309		−4.3%
2020	288		−6.8%
2021 (est.)	283	▼	−1.7%

At the 2000 census there were 323 people, 148 households, and 93 families living in the borough. The population density was 1,455.0 inhabitants per square mile (561.8/km^{2}). There were 153 housing units at an average density of 689.2 per square mile (266.1/km^{2}). The racial makeup of the borough was 98.76% White, 0.62% African American, and 0.62% from two or more races. Hispanic or Latino of any race were 0.31%.

There were 148 households, 25.0% had children under the age of 18 living with them, 49.3% were married couples living together, 12.8% had a female householder with no husband present, and 36.5% were non-families. 31.8% of households were made up of individuals, and 10.1% were one person aged 65 or older. The average household size was 2.18 and the average family size was 2.77.

The age distribution was 19.5% under the age of 18, 8.4% from 18 to 24, 34.7% from 25 to 44, 22.0% from 45 to 64, and 15.5% 65 or older. The median age was 38 years. For every 100 females there were 88.9 males. For every 100 females age 18 and over, there were 85.7 males.

The median household income was $26,161 and the median family income was $30,000. Males had a median income of $24,286 versus $18,750 for females. The per capita income for the borough was $13,603. About 11.7% of families and 14.7% of the population were below the poverty line, including 32.8% of those under age 18 and 3.2% of those age 65 or over.

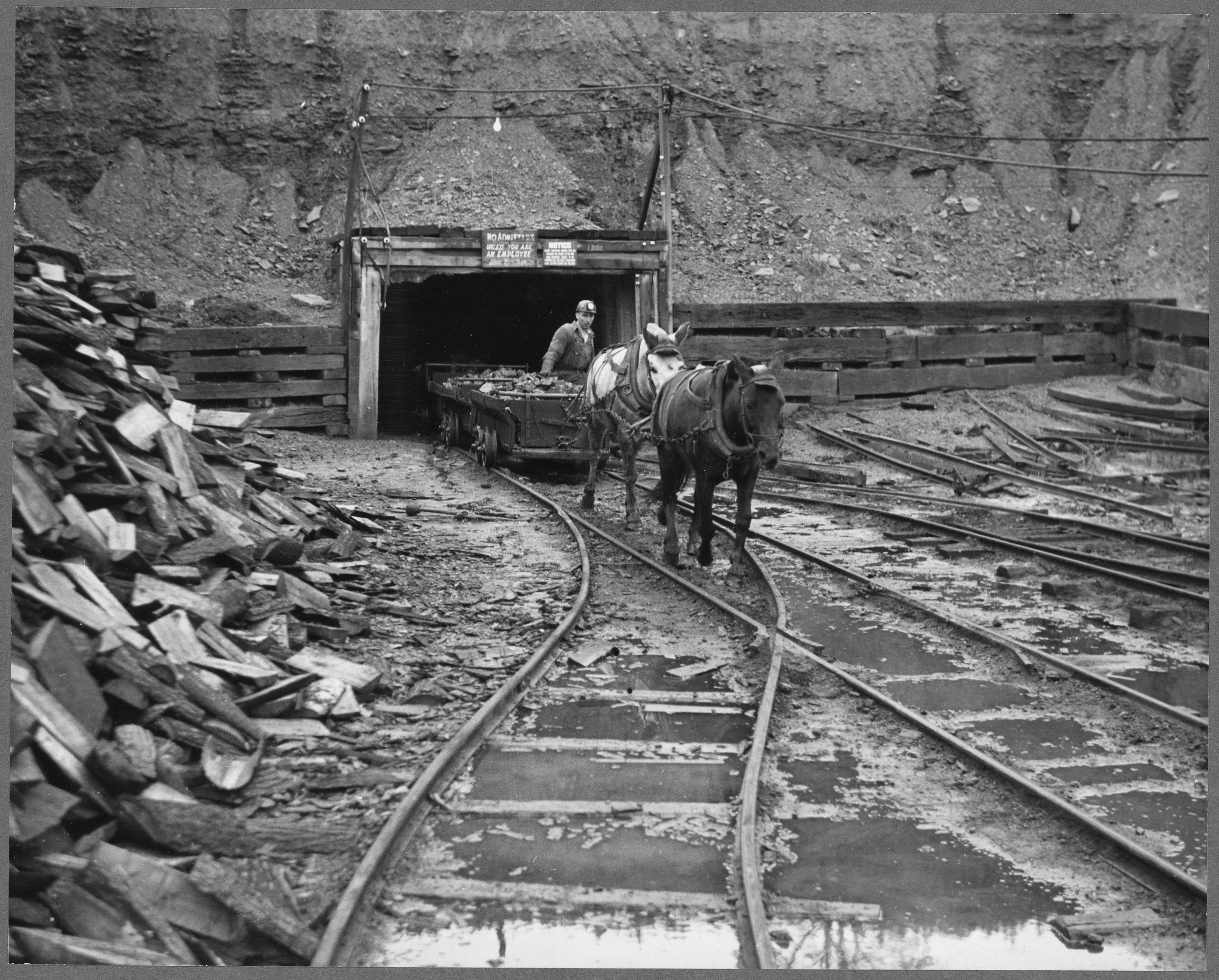
S. C. Streams Black Diamond Mine, Creekside, Pennsylvania (1946)
