= Bethel Township, Armstrong County, Pennsylvania =

Township in Pennsylvania, US

Coordinates: 40°42′24″N 79°33′11″W

- Township
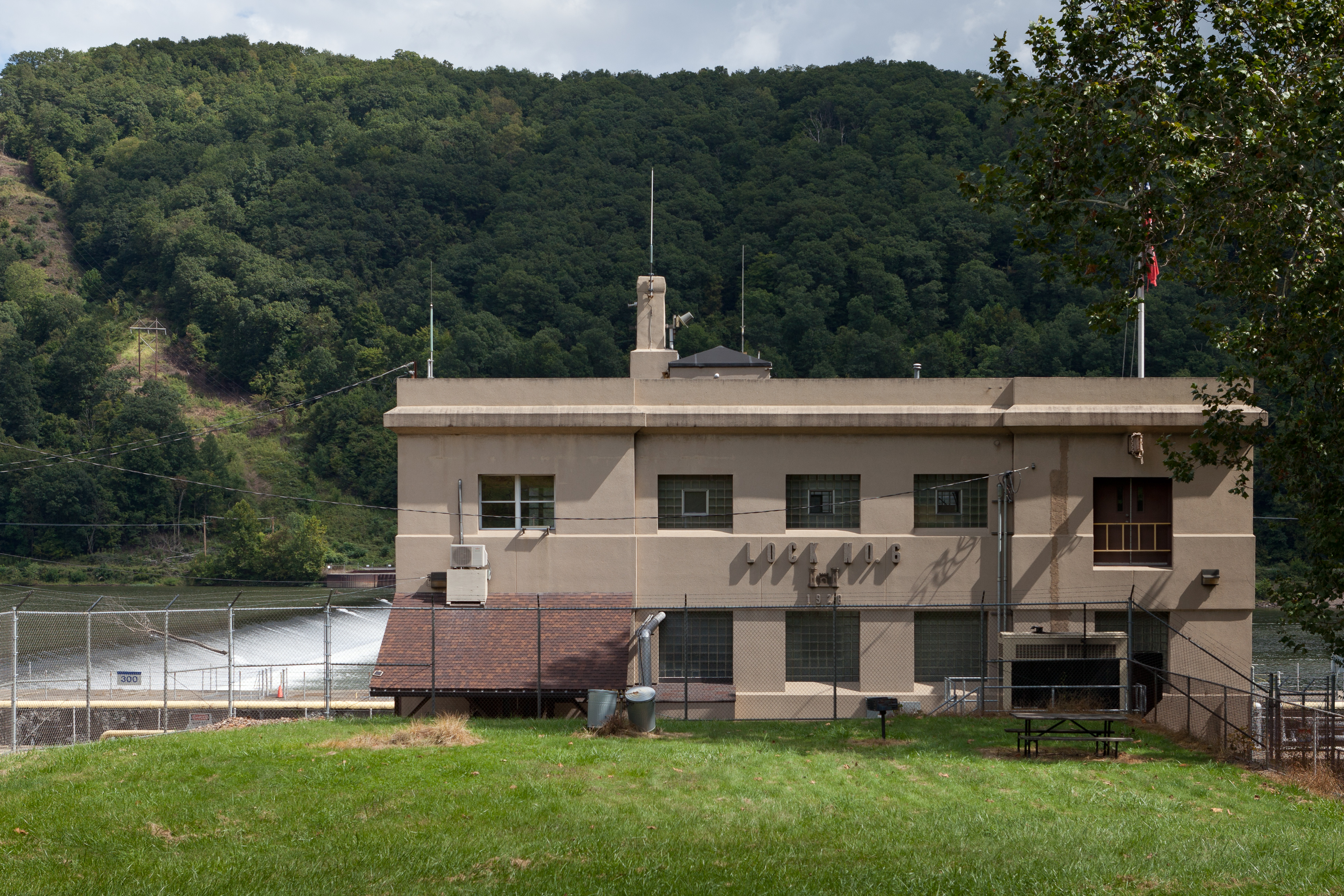
- The Allegheny River Lock and Dam No. 6

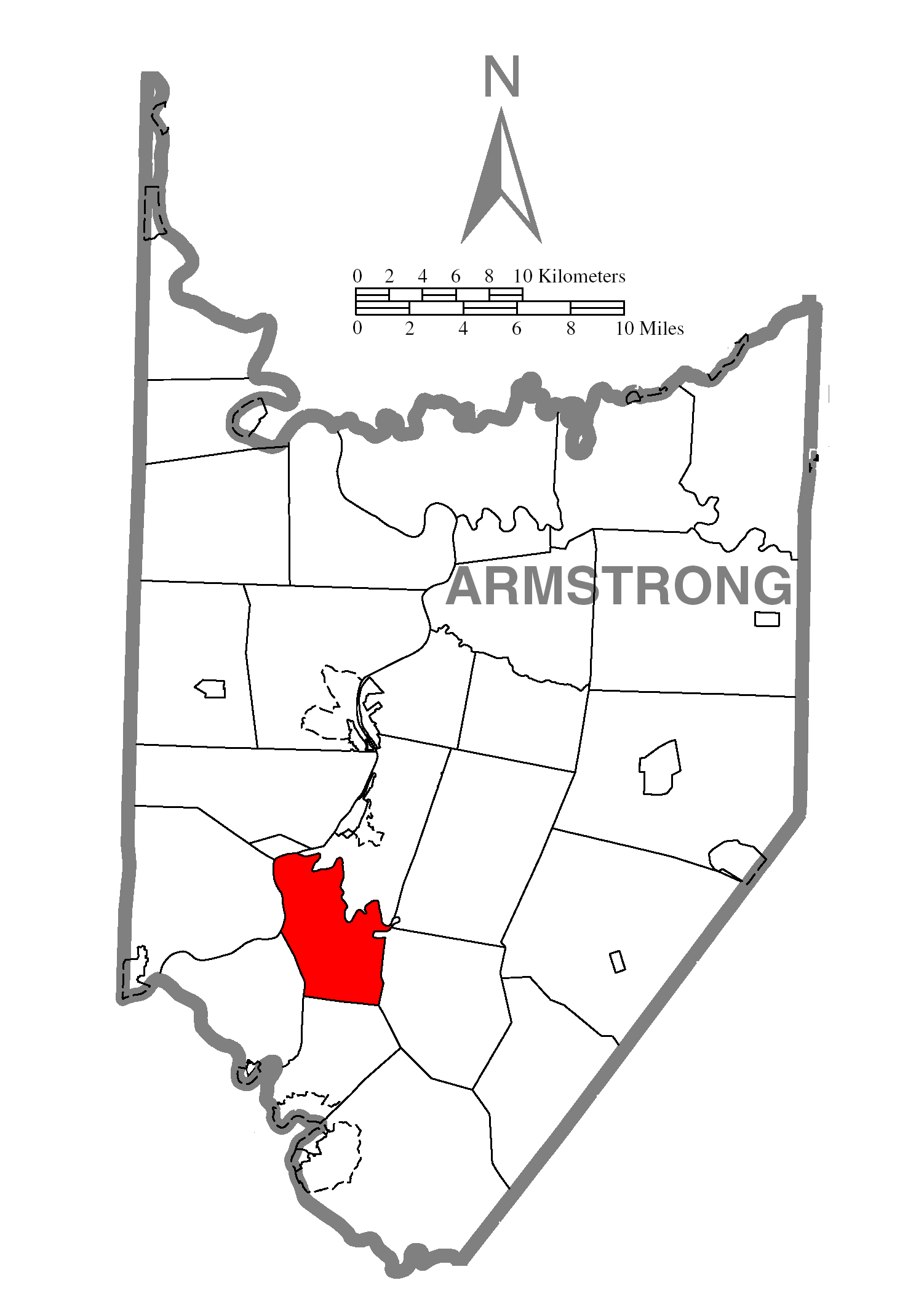
- Map of Armstrong County, Pennsylvania highlighting Bethel Township

- Map of Armstrong County, Pennsylvania
- Country: United States
- State: Pennsylvania
- County: Armstrong
- Settled: 1792
- Incorporated: 1878

Area
  - Total: 15.86 sq mi (41.08 km^{2})
  - Land: 15.28 sq mi (39.58 km^{2})
  - Water: 0.58 sq mi (1.50 km^{2})

Population (2020)
  - Total: 1,096
  - Estimate (2021): 1,088
  - Density: 76.4/sq mi (29.51/km^{2})
- Time zone: UTC-5 (Eastern (EST))
  - Summer (DST): UTC-4 (EDT)
- FIPS code: 42-005-05992
- Website: www.betheltownshiparmstrong.com

Bethel Township is a township in Armstrong County, Pennsylvania, United States. The population was 1,096 at the 2020 census, a decrease from the figure of 1,183 tabulated in 2010.

== Geography ==
Bethel Township is located in south-central Armstrong County, along the east bank of the Allegheny River. Its eastern boundary is formed by Crooked Creek, a tributary of the Allegheny.

According to the United States Census Bureau, the township has a total area of 15.9 square miles (41.1 km^{2}), of which 15.3 square miles (39.6 km^{2}) is land and 0.58 square miles (1.5 km^{2}), or 3.73%, is water.

== History ==
Bethel Township was originally merged with the neighboring townships of Gilpin and Parks, known as Allegheny Township. In 1878, finding it was too large to manage and supervise, the three split and Bethel Township was incorporated.

The Allegheny River Lock and Dam No. 6 was listed on the National Register of Historic Places in 2000.

== Demographics ==
Historical population
| Census | Pop. | Note | %± |
|---|---|---|---|
| 2010 | 1,183 | | — |
| 2020 | 1,096 | | −7.4% |
| 2021 (est.) | 1,088 | | −0.7% |
U.S. Decennial Census

As of the 2000 census, there were 1,290 people, 501 households, and 378 families residing in the township. The population density was 84.4 inhabitants per square mile (32.6/km^{2}). There were 656 housing units at an average density of 42.9 per square mile (16.6/km^{2}). The racial makeup of the township was 99.53% White, 0.23% African American, 0.16% Asian, and 0.08% from two or more races.

There were 501 households, out of which 31.5% had children under the age of 18 living with them, 65.5% were married couples living together, 7.4% had a female householder with no husband present, and 24.4% were non-families. 21.0% of all households were made up of individuals, and 8.2% had someone living alone who was 65 years of age or older. The average household size was 2.57 and the average family size was 2.99.

The median age of 41 years was slightly more than that of the county of 40 years. The distribution was23.3% under the age of 18, 5.4% from 18 to 24, 28.7% from 25 to 44, 27.4% from 45 to 64, and 15.2% who were 65 years of age or older. The median age was 41 years. For every 100 females there were 111.5 males. For every 100 females age 18 and over, there were 106.7 males.

The median income for a household in the township was $36,087, and the median income for a family was $41,591. Males had a median income of $30,980 versus $22,446 for females. The per capita income for the township was $18,122. About 5.0% of families and 7.3% of the population were below the poverty line, including 11.5% of those under age 18 and 6.4% of those age 65 or over.

== Cemeteries ==
- Bethel Lutheran Church Cemetery
- Crooked Creek Presbyterian Cemetery
- Homewood Baptist Church Cemetery
- Smail Family Cemetery
