= Pennsylvania Route 356 =

State highway in Pennsylvania, US

Pennsylvania Route 356

Route information
- Maintained by PennDOT
- Length: 32.453 mi (52.228 km)

Major junctions
- South end: PA 66 near Oklahoma
- PA 56 near West Leechburg; PA 128 in Freeport; PA 28 near Freeport; PA 228 in Buffalo Township; PA 68 in Butler
- North end: US 422 near Butler

Location
- Country: United States
- State: Pennsylvania
- Counties: Westmoreland, Allegheny, Butler, Armstrong

Highway system
- Pennsylvania State Route System; Interstate; US; State; Scenic; Legislative
← PA 354	→ PA 358
← PA 465	→ PA 467

Pennsylvania Route 356 (PA 356) is a 32.5-mile-long (52.3 km) state highway located in Westmoreland, Allegheny, Butler, and Armstrong counties in Pennsylvania. The southern terminus is at PA 66 near Oklahoma. The northern terminus is at U.S. Route 422 (US 422) near Butler.

== Route description ==
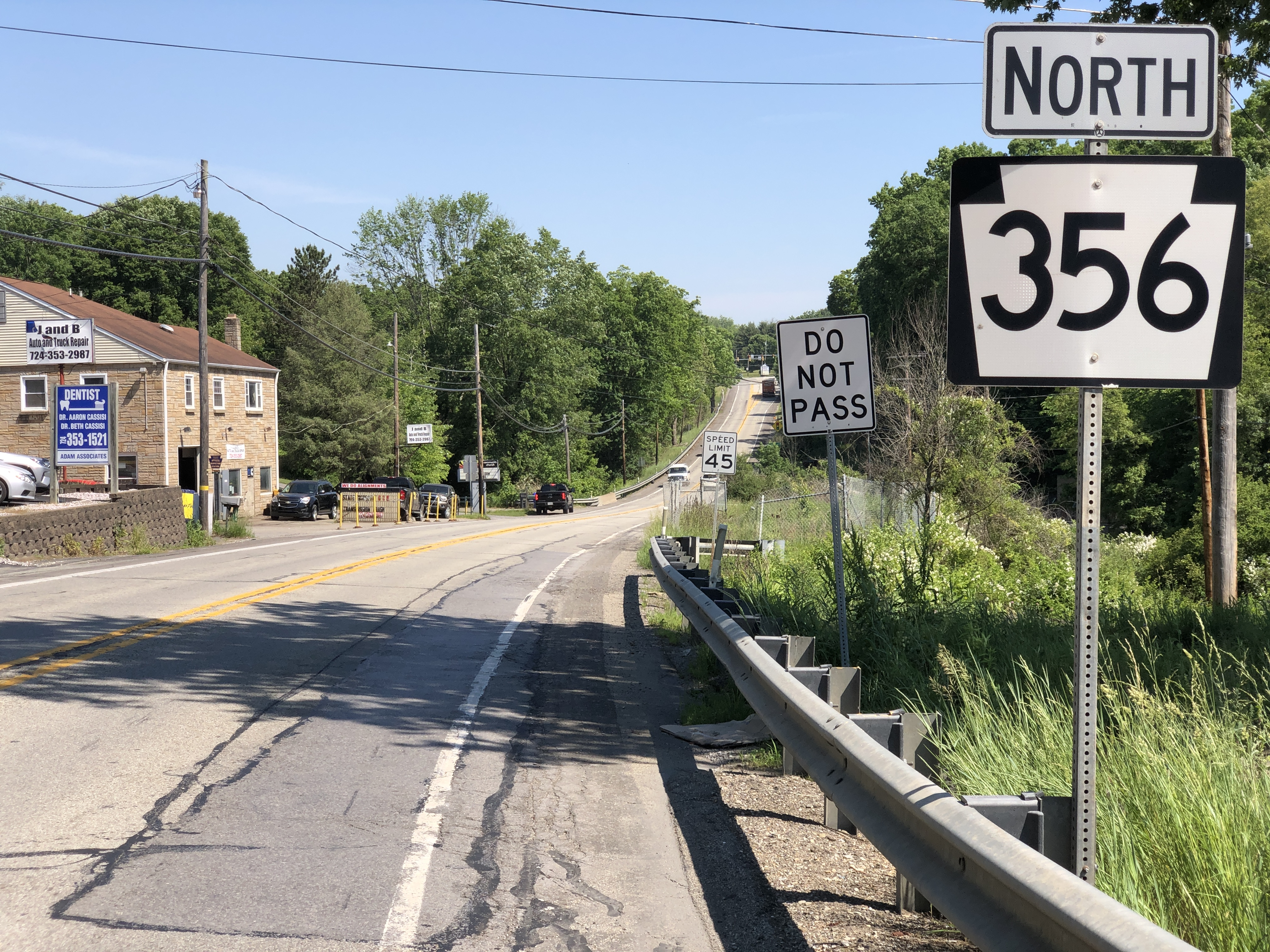
PA 356 northbound past PA 228 in Sarverville

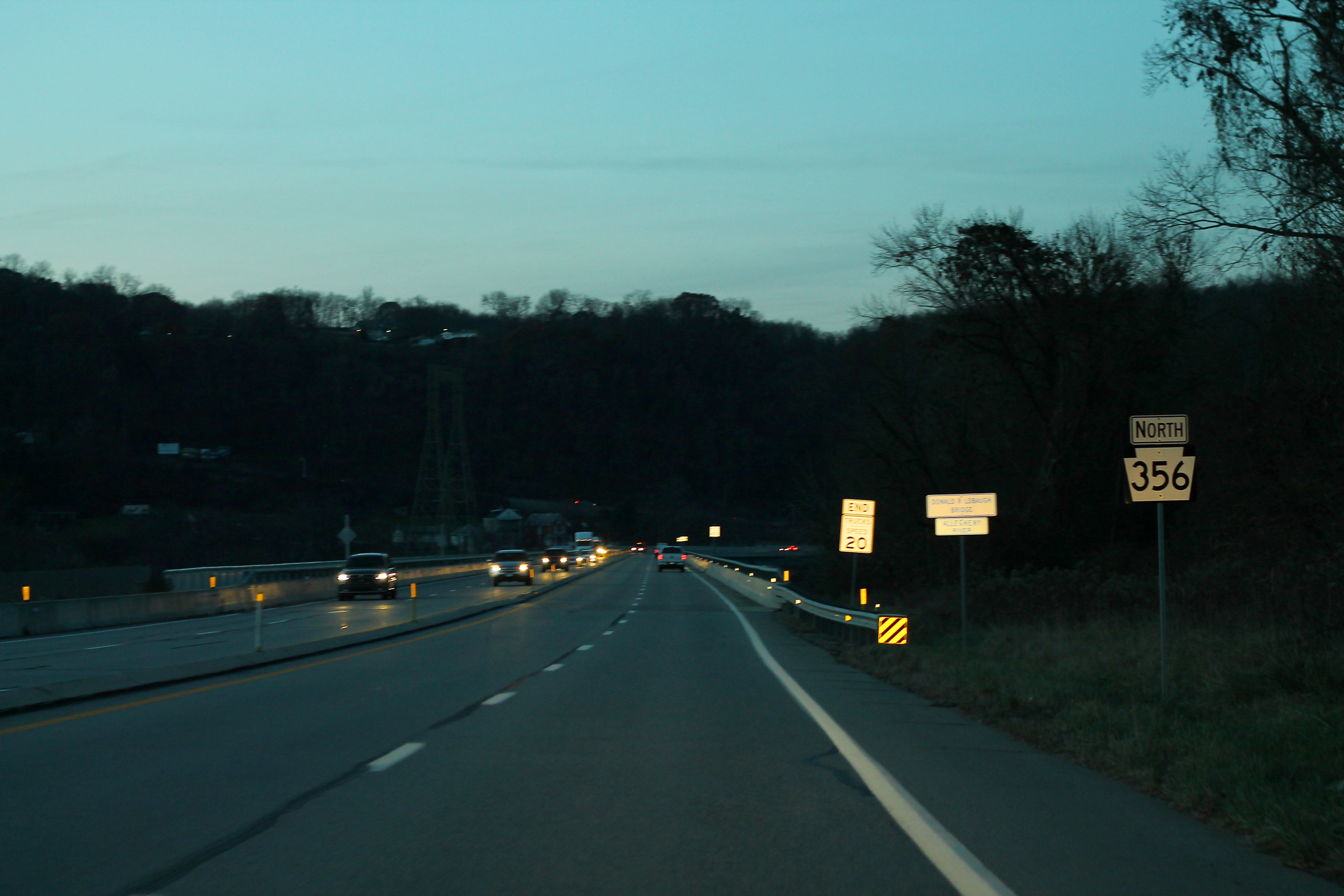
PA 356 northbound at the Donald R. Lobaugh Bridge over the Allegheny River

PA 356 begins at an intersection with PA 66 in Washington Township, Westmoreland County, heading north on a two-lane undivided road. The route passes through wooded areas with some farm fields and homes, crossing into Allegheny Township. The road continues northwest, heading into farmland with some residential and commercial development. At this point, PA 356 begins to run to the southwest of PA 56, heading through wooded areas of homes and passing through Weinel Crossroads. The route comes to an intersection with PA 56, with that route heading northwest concurrent with PA 356. The road passes more homes and some businesses before PA 56 splits to the west on Leechburg Road. PA 356 winds northwest through woodland with a few residences, continuing into a mix of farmland and woods with some homes. The road passes through Garvers Ferry and widens into a four-lane divided highway, coming to the Donald R. Lobaugh Bridge over the Allegheny River.

While crossing the river, PA 356 briefly passes through the borough of Freeport in Armstrong County before heading through a corner of Harrison Township in Allegheny County as it crosses onto the northwest bank of the Allegheny River and becomes Butler Road. A short distance past the river, the route enters Buffalo Township in Butler County and passes over Norfolk Southern's Conemaugh Line before it comes to an intersection with Freeport Road. Here, PA 356 turns to the north as a four-lane road and runs along the west bank of the Buffalo Creek and crosses into Freeport in Armstrong County, coming to an intersection with the southern terminus of PA 128 just east of the county line.

From here, the route continues north on three-lane undivided Butler Road back into Buffalo Township in Butler County, carrying two northbound lanes and one southbound lane as it heads through wooded areas. The road turns northwest and heads into commercial areas in Schuster Heights, widening into a four-lane divided highway as it comes to an interchange with the PA 28 freeway. Past this interchange, the route becomes South Pike Road and passes northeast of a park and ride lot. PA 356 becomes a three-lane road with a center left-turn lane, passing a mix of homes and businesses and running through Nolf Corners and Silverville and narrowing back to two lanes. The route heads into a mix of farmland and woodland with some residential and commercial establishments, coming to a junction with the eastern terminus of PA 228 in Sarverville. Here, the road curves to the north-northwest as North Pike Road and runs through more rural areas with some development and passes through Lernerville, where it runs past Lernerville Speedway. PA 356 heads into Winfield Township and runs through open agricultural areas with some woods and homes. The route enters Jefferson Township and heads northwest through rural areas of residences and businesses, passing through Hannahstown. The road runs through more farmland with some patches of woods and development, becoming Freeport Road.

PA 356 continues through rural areas and heads into Summit Township. The route heads through more areas of farms and woods with housing, heading into increasing residential development and turning west into Butler Township. PA 356 turns north onto Center Avenue and passes farms to the west and homes to the east before entering the city of Butler. The road continues through residential areas, turning to the northwest. The route heads into urban areas of homes and businesses, continuing onto East Wayne Street and coming to a bridge over the Buffalo and Pittsburgh Railroad's B&P Main Line Subdivision line and the Canadian National's Bessemer Subdivision railroad line. PA 356 curves west and heads into the commercial downtown of Butler, intersecting PA 8. At this point, the route turns north to join PA 8 on South Main Street, a three-lane road with a center left-turn lane that runs through more of the downtown. The road comes to Cunningham Street which is the eastbound one-way pair carrying PA 68 east and southbound PA 356. Two blocks later at Jefferson Street, the westbound one-way pair of PA 68 crosses at which point PA 356 turns west to join PA 68. The one-way pair leaves the downtown and heads into residential areas with some businesses, with both directions of PA 68/PA 356 rejoining and heading northwest on two-lane, two-way West Cunningham Street. The two routes turn west onto New Castle Street and pass more development, crossing into Butler Township and becoming New Castle Road. PA 68/PA 356 continues northwest through wooded areas and commercial development, gaining a center left-turn lane. PA 68 splits from PA 356 by heading west on Evans City Road, and PA 356 passes more businesses. The road passes more shopping centers as well as the Butler VA Medical Center, widening into a five-lane road with a center left-turn lane. PA 356 turns north onto a brief four-lane divided highway where the state route ends at an unfinished cloverleaf interchange with the US 422 freeway. The divided highway ends at a dead end just north of the interchange.

== Major intersections ==
County	Location	mi	km	Destinations	Notes
Westmoreland	Washington Township	0.000	0.000	PA 66 – Greensburg, Apollo	Southern terminus
Westmoreland	Allegheny Township	5.235	8.425	PA 56 east (South Leechburg Hill Road) – Leechburg, Vandergrift	South end of PA 56 overlap
Westmoreland	Allegheny Township	5.763	9.275	PA 56 west (Leechburg Road) – New Kensington	North end of PA 56 overlap
Allegheny River		10.430– 10.892	16.785– 17.529	Donald R. Lobaugh Bridge	
Butler	No major junctions				
Armstrong	Freeport	11.146	17.938	PA 128 north (2nd Street) – Freeport	Southern terminus of PA 128
Butler	Buffalo Township	12.541– 12.841	20.183– 20.666	PA 28 (Allegheny Valley Expressway) – Kittanning, Pittsburgh	PA 28 exit 17
Butler	Buffalo Township	15.998	25.746	PA 228 west (Sarver Road) – Ekastown, Saxonburg, Glade Mills	Eastern terminus of PA 228
Butler	Butler	28.580	45.995	PA 8 south (South Main Street) / West Wayne Street	South end of PA 8 overlap
Butler	Butler	28.773	46.306	PA 68 east (Cunningham Street)	South end of PA 68 overlap with southbound PA 356
Butler	Butler	28.856	46.439	PA 8 north (North Main Street) / PA 68 east (East Jefferson Street, East Cunningham Street)	North end of PA 8 overlap, south end of PA 68 overlap with northbound PA 356
Butler	Butler Township	30.579	49.212	PA 68 west (Evans City Road) – Evans City, Zelienople	North end of PA 68 overlap
Butler	Butler Township	32.294– 32.453	51.972– 52.228	US 422 (Benjamin Franklin Highway) – New Castle, Kittanning	Interchange; northern terminus
1.000 mi = 1.609 km; 1.000 km = 0.621 mi: Concurrency terminus
