= Eric Ravotti =

American football player (born 1971)

No. 57
- Position: Linebacker

Personal information
- Born: March 16, 1971 (age 55); Freeport, Pennsylvania, U.S.
- Listed height: 6 ft 3 in (1.91 m)
- Listed weight: 250 lb (113 kg)

Career information
- High school: Freeport (Sarver, Pennsylvania)
- College: Penn State (1989–1993)
- NFL draft: 1994: 6th round, 180th overall pick

Career history
- Pittsburgh Steelers (1994–1996)

Career NFL statistics
- Tackles: 15
- Sacks: 2
- Fumble recoveries: 1
- Stats at Pro Football Reference

Eric Allen Ravotti (born March 16, 1971) is an American former professional football player who was a linebacker for three seasons with the Pittsburgh Steelers of the National Football League (NFL). He was selected by the Steelers in the sixth round of the 1994 NFL draft after playing college football for the Penn State Nittany Lions.

== Early life and college ==
Eric Allen Ravotti was born on March 16, 1971, in Freeport, Pennsylvania. He attended Freeport Senior High School in Freeport.

At Pennsylvania State University, he was a letterman for the Nittany Lions in 1989, 1990, 1991, and 1993. He did not play in 1992.

== Professional career ==
Ravotti was selected by the Pittsburgh Steelers in the sixth round, with the 180th overall pick, of the 1994 NFL draft. He officially signed with the team on May 6, 1994. He played in two games for the Steelers during his rookie year in 1994. He appeared in six games, starting one, during the 1995 season and recorded seven solo tackles. Ravotti appeared in 15 games, starting two, in 1996, totaling five solo tackles, three assisted tackles, two sacks, and one fumble recovery. He also played in two playoff games that year. He became a free agent after the 1996 season and re-signed with the team on April 17, 1997. He was released on August 24, 1997. Ravotti signed with the Steelers again the next year on April 23, 1998, before being released on August 30, 1998.

== Coaching career ==
Ravotti served as a volunteer assistant coach at his alma mater, Freeport Senior High School, in 2010. In 2011, he became the head coach at Fox Chapel Area High School.
