= Donald R. Lobaugh =

United States Army Medal of Honor recipient

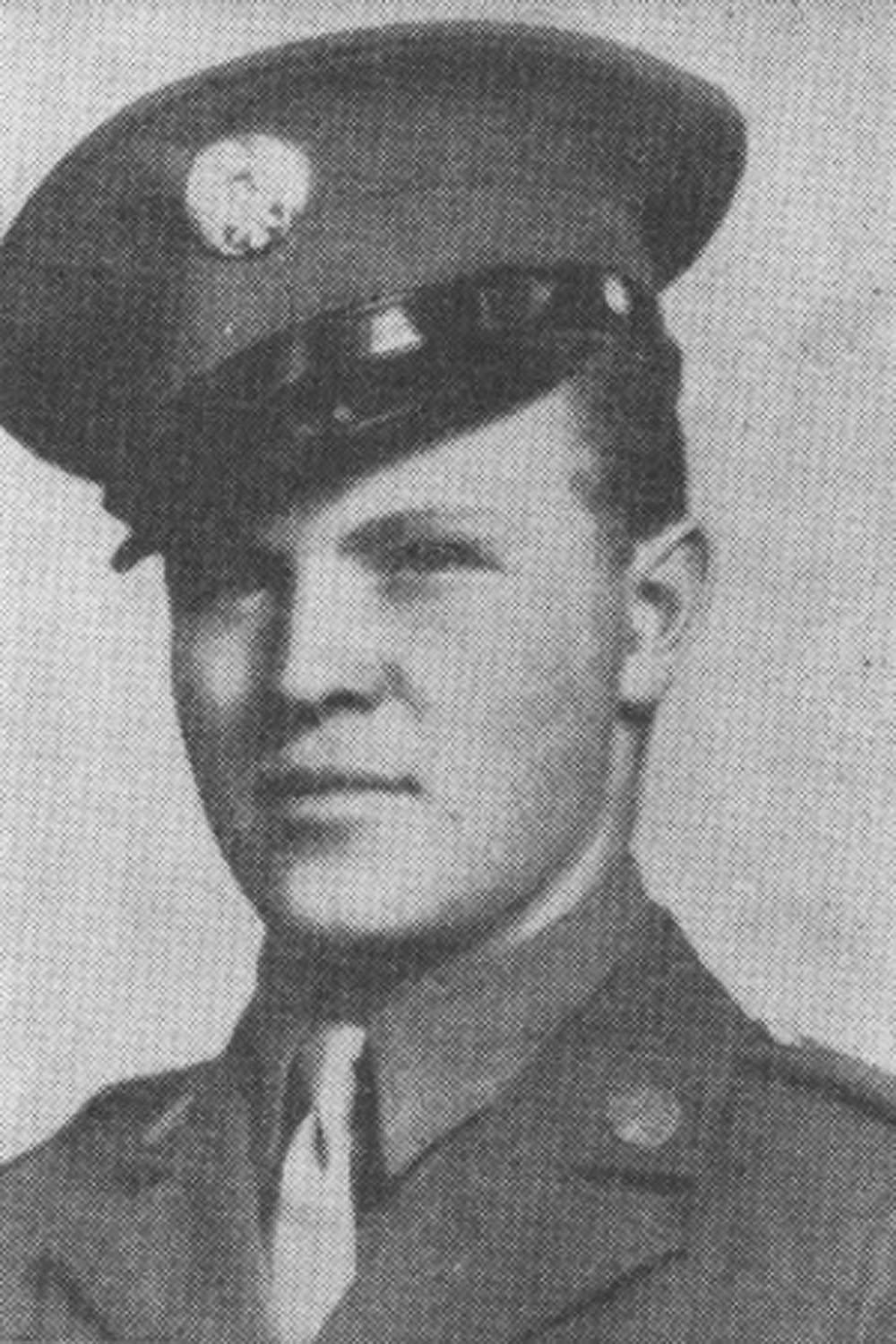
- Donald Lobaugh in 1942
- Born: February 7, 1925; Freeport, Pennsylvania, US
- Died: July 22, 1944 (aged 19) near Afua, Dutch New Guinea
- Burial place: Rimersburg Cemetery, Rimersburg, Pennsylvania
- Military career
- Allegiance: United States
- Branch: United States Army
- Service years: 1942 - 1944
- Rank: Private
- Units: 127th Infantry Regiment, 32nd Infantry Division
- Conflicts: World War II
- Awards: Medal of Honor

Donald Ronald Lobaugh (February 7, 1925 – July 22, 1944) was a United States Army soldier and a recipient of the United States military's highest decoration—the Medal of Honor—for his actions in World War II.

== Biography ==
Lobaugh joined the Army from his birthplace of Freeport, Pennsylvania in May 1942, and by July 22, 1944, was serving as a private in the 127th Infantry Regiment, 32nd Infantry Division. On that day, near Afua, Dutch New Guinea, he single-handedly attacked an enemy machine gun emplacement which was pinning down one platoon of his company. Lobaugh was killed in the attack and, on April 17, 1945, posthumously awarded the Medal of Honor.

Lobaugh, aged 19 at his death, was buried at Rimersburg Cemetery in Rimersburg, Pennsylvania. In 2004 he was inducted into the Hall of Valor at the Soldiers and Sailors National Military Museum and Memorial in Pittsburgh.

== Medal of Honor citation ==
Private Lobaugh's official Medal of Honor citation reads:

For conspicuous gallantry and intrepidity at the risk of his life above and beyond the call of duty near Afua, New Guinea, on July 22, 1944. While Pvt. Lobaugh's company was withdrawing from its position on July 21, the enemy attacked and cut off approximately 1 platoon of our troops. The platoon immediately occupied, organized, and defended a position, which it held throughout the night. Early on July 22, an attempt was made to effect its withdrawal, but during the preparation therefor, the enemy emplaced a machinegun, protected by the fire of rifles and automatic weapons, which blocked the only route over which the platoon could move. Knowing that it was the key to the enemy position, Pvt. Lobaugh volunteered to attempt to destroy this weapon, even though in order to reach it he would be forced to work his way about 30 yards over ground devoid of cover. When part way across this open space he threw a hand grenade, but exposed himself in the act and was wounded. Needless of his wound, he boldly rushed the emplacement, firing as he advanced. The enemy concentrated their fire on him, and he was struck repeatedly, but he continued his attack and killed 2 more before he was himself slain. Pvt. Lobaugh's heroic actions inspired his comrades to press the attack, and to drive the enemy from the position with heavy losses. His fighting determination and intrepidity in battle exemplify the highest traditions of the U.S. Armed Forces.

== Awards and decorations ==

Badge	Combat Infantryman Badge		
1st row	Medal of Honor		
2nd row	Bronze Star Medal	Purple Heart	Army Good Conduct Medal
3rd row	American Campaign Medal	Asiatic-Pacific Campaign Medal with 1 Campaign star	World War II Victory Medal

== Recognition ==
In 1965, a vehicular cantilever bridge across the Allegheny River between Buffalo Township and Allegheny Township, Pennsylvania was named in Lobaugh's honor. Lobaugh was born in the nearby town of Freeport, Pennsylvania.

== See also ==
- List of Medal of Honor recipients
- Donald R. Lobaugh Bridge
