= Kiski Area School District =

School district in Pennsylvania

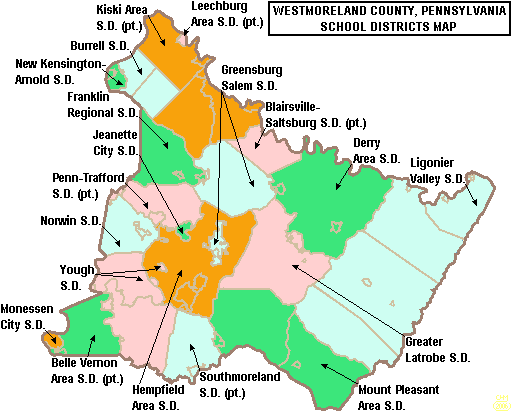

Address
- 200 Poplar Street Vandergrift, Pennsylvania, 15690-2022; United States

District information
- Type: Public
- Grades: K–12
- Established: 1958; 68 years ago
- Superintendent: Dr. Jason Lohr

Students and staff
- Enrollment: 3,634
- District mascot: Cavalier
- Colors: Navy and gold

Other information
- Website: www.kiskiarea.com

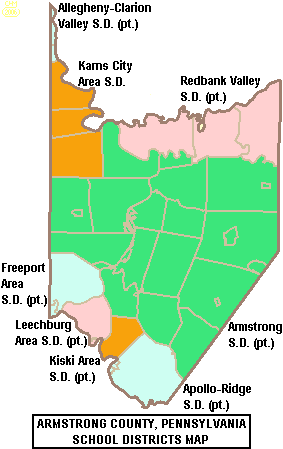
Kiski Area School District region in Armstrong County

The Kiski Area School District is a large, suburban/rural public school district located in Westmoreland County Pennsylvania. The district encompasses approximately 102 square miles (260 km^{2}) and consists of nine municipalities in Armstrong and Westmoreland counties, the district is headquartered in Allegheny Township.

== Municipalities ==
The school district serves

- Allegheny Township
- Avonmore Borough
- Bell Township
- East Vandergrift Borough
- Hyde Park Borough
- Oklahoma Borough
- Vandergrift Borough
- Washington Township
- Parks Township

== Schools ==
There are currently three primary elementary schools (grades K–4), an upper elementary school (grades 5–6), an intermediate school (grades 7–8), and a high school (grades 9–12) within the district.

=== Elementary schools (grades K–4) ===
School name	School Address	Principal
East Primary (formerly Vandergrift)	420 Franklin Ave. Vandergrift, Pennsylvania. 15690	Dan Smith
North Primary (formerly Allegheny-Hyde Park)	1048 School Rd. Leechburg, Pennsylvania. 15656	Chad Roland
South Primary (formerly Mamont)	230 Mamont Dr. Export, Pennsylvania. 15632	Brian Kutchak

=== Upper Elementary (grades 5–6) ===
School name	School Address	Principal	Assistant Principal
Kiski Area Upper Elementary (Formally North Washington)	4350 Rte. 66 Apollo, Pennsylvania. 15613	Maggie Nicholas	Ryan Quinton

=== Intermediate school (grades 7–8) ===
School name	School Address	Principal	Assistant Principal
Kiski Area Intermediate School	240 Hyde Park Rd Leechburg, Pennsylvania. 15656	Michael Cardamone	John Cortazzo

=== High school (grades 9–12) ===
School name	School Address	Principal	Assistant Principal
Kiski Area High School	240 Hyde Park Rd. Leechburg, Pennsylvania. 15656	Matt Smith	Braden Hoffer Alicia Szarek

== Budgeting ==
Kiski Area School District's final 2024-2025 budget is $68,773,080.

== See also ==
List of school districts in Pennsylvania
