= Church of Saint Gertrude =

Church of Saint Gertrude might refer to several churches:

- Collegiate Church of Saint Gertrude in Belgium
- Gertrudiskerk in Netherlands
- Church of St. Gertrude, Kaunas in Lithuania
- St. Gertrude Roman Catholic Church, Vandergrift, Pennsylvania, USA, listed on the NRHP in Pennsylvania
- St. Gertrude's Convent and Chapel, Cottonwood, Idaho, USA, listed on the NRHP in Idaho
