= Allegheny Township, Westmoreland County, Pennsylvania =

Township in Pennsylvania, US

- Township
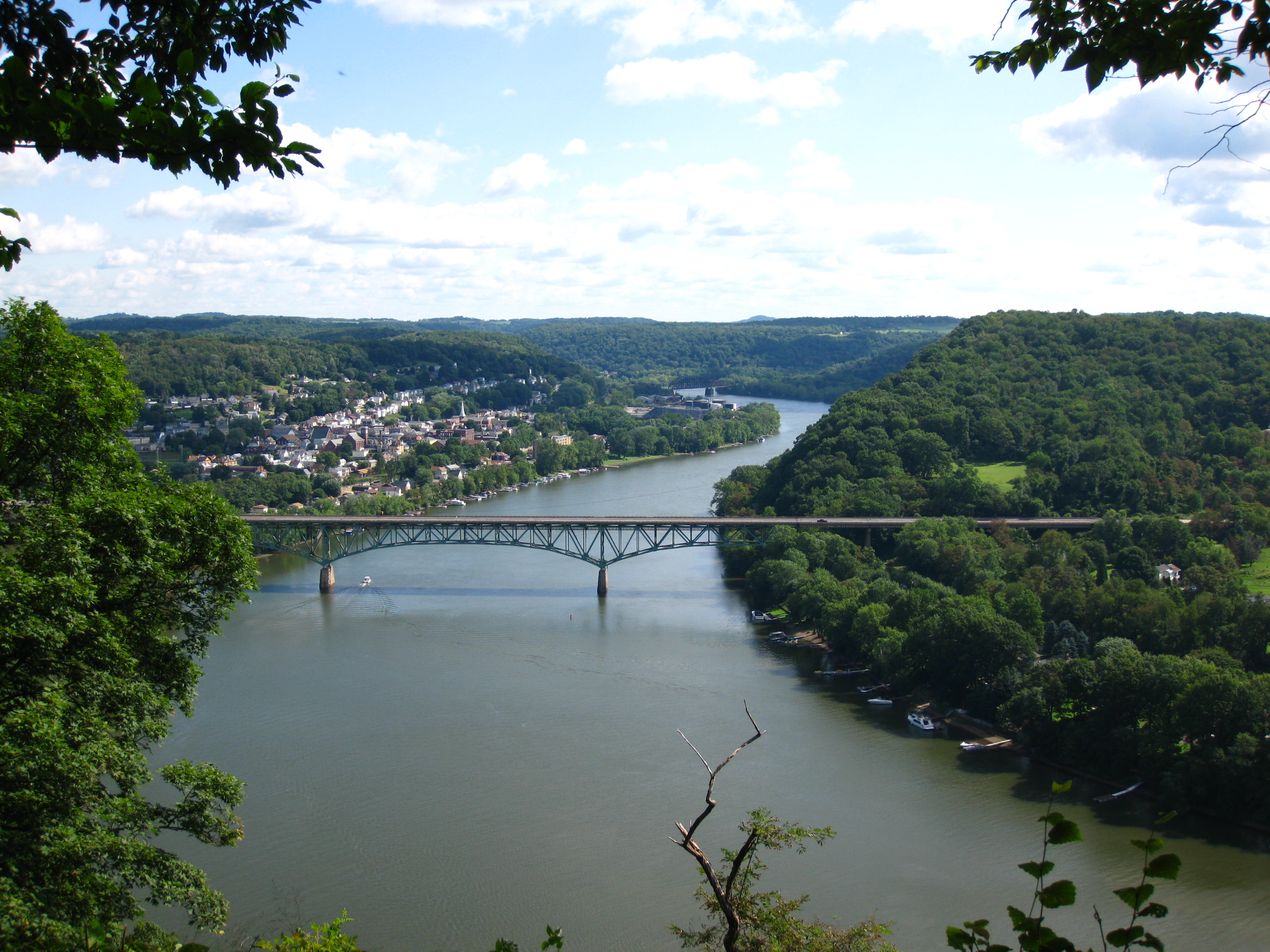
- Donald R. Lobaugh Bridge over the Allegheny River

- Logo

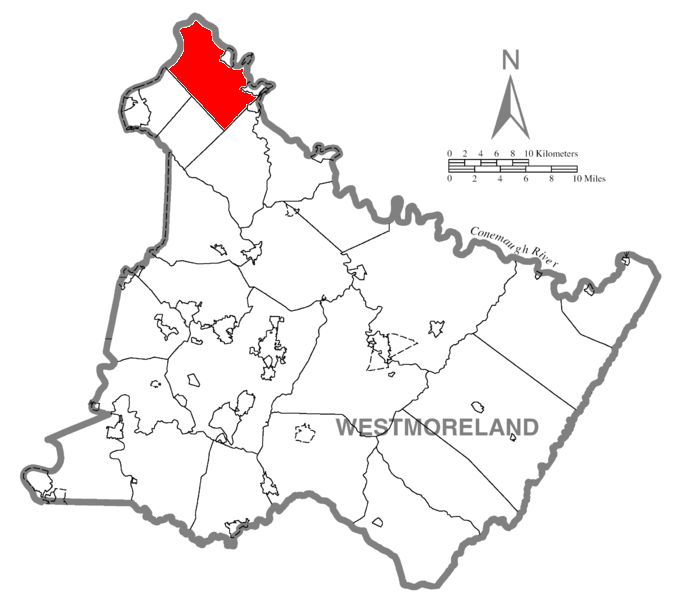
- Map of Westmoreland County, Pennsylvania Highlighting Allegheny Township

- Map of Pennsylvania highlighting Westmoreland County
- Country: United States
- State: Pennsylvania
- County: Westmoreland
- Settled: 1790
- Incorporated: 1796

Area
  - Total: 31.89 sq mi (82.60 km^{2})
  - Land: 31.09 sq mi (80.52 km^{2})
  - Water: 0.80 sq mi (2.08 km^{2})

Population (2020)
  - Total: 8,316
  - Estimate (2021): 8,273
  - Density: 262.0/sq mi (101.15/km^{2})
- Time zone: UTC-5 (Eastern (EST))
  - Summer (DST): UTC-4 (EDT)
- Zip code: 15068, 15656, 15690, 15613, 16229
- Area code: 724
- FIPS code: 42-129-00892
- Website: alleghenytownship.net

Allegheny Township is a township in Westmoreland County, Pennsylvania, United States. The population was 8,316 at the 2020 census, an increase from 8,002 at the 2000 census. It is the northernmost municipality of Westmoreland County. The municipality borders the townships of Buffalo, Harrison, Upper Burrell, and Washington; and the boroughs of Oklahoma, Vandergrift, Leechburg, West Leechburg, Lower Burrell, Freeport and Hyde Park. It is served by the Kiski Area School District.

== History ==
Although there are many who believe Allegheny Township was formed in 1796, it appears, according to available records, that the Township was actually formed from Washington Township in 1820. At its formation, Allegheny Township included what is now Lower Burrell, Hyde Park, Vandergrift, West Leechburg, Arnold and New Kensington. There had been an earlier Allegheny Township formed by the Westmoreland County Court of Quarter Sessions in December 1795, north of the Kiskiminetas River in what is now known as Armstrong County. The area was a hunting ground for Seneca, and later, Delaware Indians.

The Allegheny Township Community Building, which is the municipality's government center, was constructed in 1976 and completed the following year at the intersection of the PA Route 356 by-pass and Junior High School Road, after state and federal funds became available from legislators to finance the project. The project happened in conjunction with the completion of the 356 bypass that same year. The building consisted of a large double door auditorium with a separation curtain to divide the room in half if needed, a zoning office, supervisor's office, tax office, municipal authority office, conference room, storage room, a kitchen and a police station. Prior to the building's completion, the township conducted business from a rented basement office at Kiski Park Plaza shopping center on Route 56 at the intersection of the 356 by-pass.

A new police station was built on the Community Building grounds in 2006.

Louise Majocha became the township's first woman supervisor in 1983. She was appointed to fill the unexpired term of Milton L. Rimmel, 46, who died July 2 of that year due to a heart attack. Majocha was appointed by the two surviving board members, Fred Hoculock and Ron Sheetz prior to the end of July. However, she chose not to run for election in November, and left office in January 1984, being succeeded by Dennis Francart.

In 1983, the Township increased its full-time police force from two to three officers, in addition to putting a third patrol car on the road.

Ralphaela J. Stoner became the township's first woman elected as supervisor in the late 80s.

== Governing Body and Executive Protocol ==
Allegheny Township is governed by an elected body under the second class Township Code of the state of Pennsylvania. The Board is called the Board of Supervisors and consists of three elected officials each serving a six-year term.

The Board of Supervisors is responsible, as a governmental unit, to strive to improve the health, safety, and welfare of the residents of Allegheny Township. In order to accomplish that task the Board adopts laws, known as ordinances, that governs various activities within the Township.

The Board appoints a Township Manager who is charged by the Board to implement the ordinances it passes, and to manage the annual budget of the Township which is adopted by the Board in December for the following calendar year. The Board of Supervisors meets on a monthly basis (Wednesday after the first Monday and the second Monday) at 7:00 p.m. in the Community Building, to conduct business on behalf of the Township. All meetings of the Board are open to the public with an opportunity at each meeting for public comment. If a resident has a concern he or she feels needs to be addressed by the Township, the individual is encouraged to contact the Township Manager's Office which may be able to address the manner promptly and/or schedule an appropriate time for that individual to present concerns to the Board of Supervisors. Residents are encouraged to present their views on Township matters at this time.

== Villages ==
Allegheny Township is the governing municipality of the following villages: Bagdad, BellVue, Braeburn Heights, Lucesco, Markle, Riverforest, Shearersburg and White Cloud.

== Geography ==
According to the United States Census Bureau, the township has a total area of 31.6 square miles (82 km^{2}), of which 30.8 square miles (80 km^{2}) is land and 0.7 square miles (1.8 km^{2}) (2.31%) is water.

== Demographics ==
Historical population
Census	Pop.	Note	%±
2000	8,002		—
2010	8,164		2.0%
2020	8,316		1.9%
2021 (est.)	8,273		−0.5%
U.S. Decennial Census

As of the census of 2000, there were 8,002 people, 3,053 households, and 2,399 families residing in the township. The population density was 259.5 inhabitants per square mile (100.2/km^{2}). There were 3,196 housing units at an average density of 103.7 per square mile (40.0/km^{2}). The racial makeup of the township was 98.36% White, 0.65% African American, 0.16% Native American, 0.11% Asian, 0.14% from other races, and 0.57% from two or more races. Hispanic or Latino of any race were 0.17% of the population.

There were 3,053 households, out of which 33.2% had children under the age of 18 living with them, 67.5% were married couples living together, 8.0% had a female householder with no husband present, and 21.4% were non-families. 18.7% of all households were made up of individuals, and 8.1% had someone living alone who was 65 years of age or older. The average household size was 2.60 and the average family size was 2.97.

In the township the population was spread out, with 23.9% under the age of 18, 6.5% from 18 to 24, 27.8% from 25 to 44, 27.5% from 45 to 64, and 14.3% who were 65 years of age or older. The median age was 41 years. For every 100 females there were 97.9 males. For every 100 females age 18 and over, there were 95.8 males.

The median income for a household in the township was $43,168, and the median income for a family was $49,347. Males had a median income of $40,745 versus $25,208 for females. The per capita income for the township was $20,910. About 5.8% of families and 7.8% of the population were below the poverty line, including 13.1% of those under age 18 and 8.2% of those age 65 or over.

== See also ==
- Baker Trail
- Donald R. Lobaugh Bridge
