= John Walter Farmstead =

Historic house in Pennsylvania, United States

- U.S. National Register of Historic Places
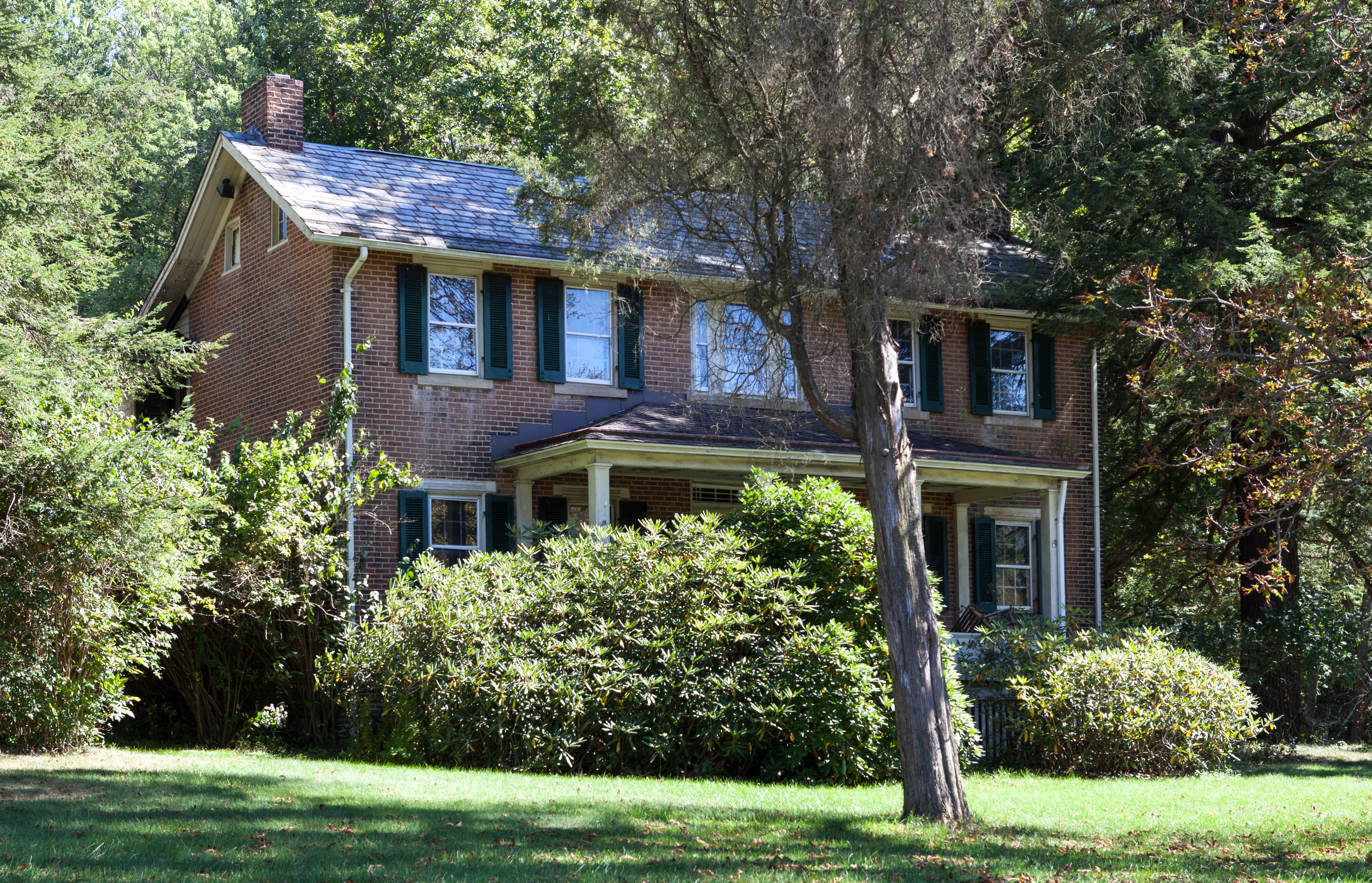
- The house in September 2014

- Location within Pennsylvania Location within the United States
- Location: 166 Mamont Dr., Washington Township Pennsylvania
- Coordinates: 40°28′19″N 79°35′21″W
- Area: 1.7 acres (0.69 ha)
- Built: c. 1846, 1848, 1912
- Architectural style: Greek Revival
- NRHP reference No.: 95000885
- Added to NRHP: July 21, 1995

The John Walter Farmstead, also known as the Lengauer House, is an historic home that is located in Washington Township, Westmoreland County, Pennsylvania, United States.

It was added to the National Register of Historic Places in 1995.

== History and architectural features ==
Built in 1848, this historic structure is a two-story, L-shaped red brick dwelling, five bays wide. Designed in the Greek Revival style, it has a low-pitched, slate-covered gable roof. The front facade has a three-bay, hipped roof porch. Associated with the house is a contributing bank barn that was built circa 1846 and a spring house that was built in 1912.
