= Vandergrift Historic District =

Historic district in Pennsylvania, United States

- U.S. National Register of Historic Places
- U.S. Historic district
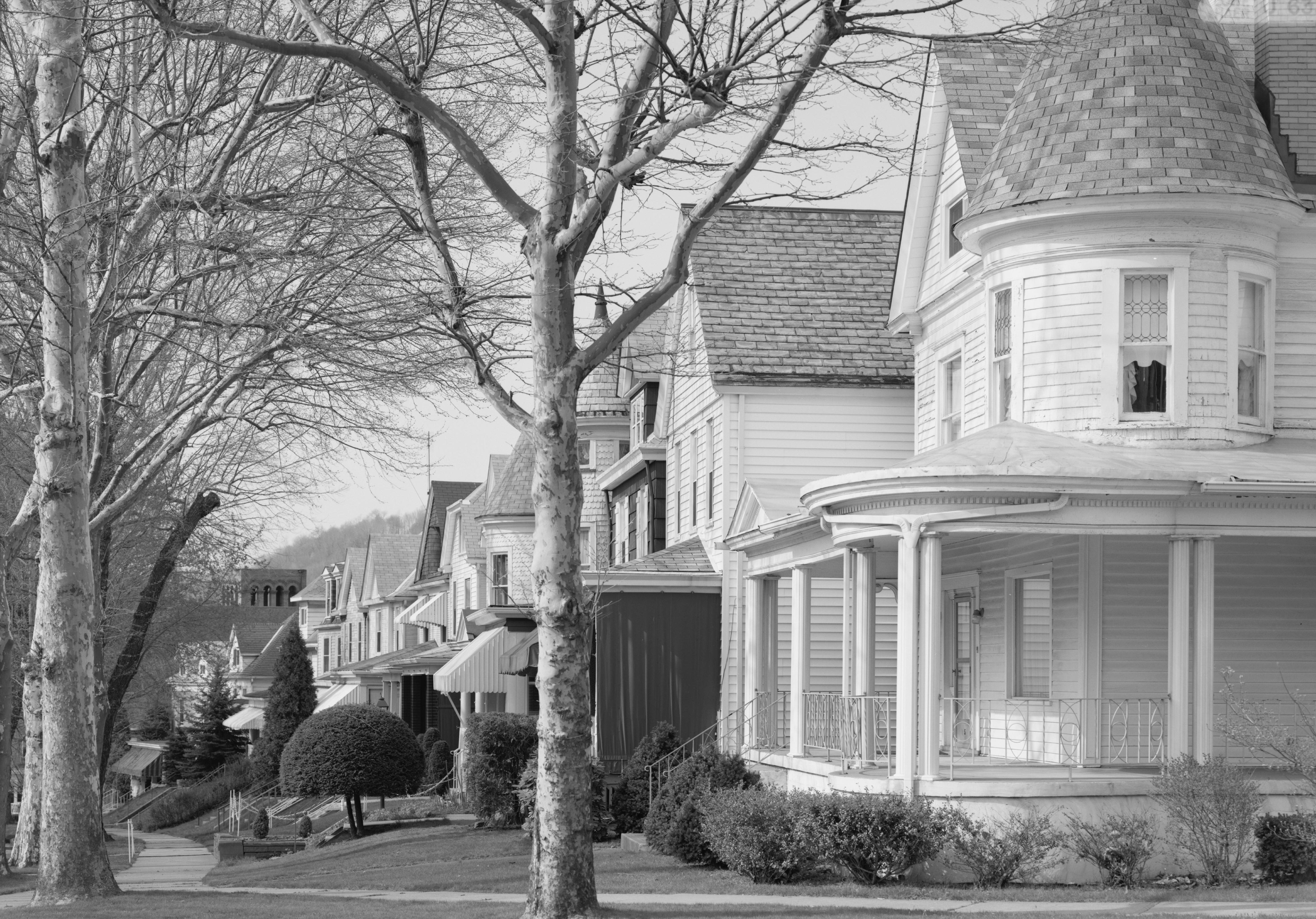
- Washington Avenue in Vandergrift, HABS photo, April 1990

- Location within Pennsylvania Location within the United States
- Location: Roughly bounded by Lincoln, Sherman, Franklin and Washington Aves., along the outer lot lines, Vandergrift, Pennsylvania
- Coordinates: 40°36′09″N 79°33′44″W
- Area: 88 acres (36 ha)
- Built: 1895
- Architect: Olmsted, Frederick Law, Firm
- Architectural style: Queen Anne, Romanesque, Colonial Revival
- NRHP reference No.: 95000525
- Added to NRHP: April 27, 1995

The Vandergrift Historic District is a national historic district that is located in Vandergrift, Westmoreland County, Pennsylvania.

It was added to the National Register of Historic Places in 1995.

== History and architectural features ==
This district encompasses 625 contributing buildings and two contributing sites that are located in Vandergrift. They were built roughly between 1895 and 1925, and includes a mix of residential, commercial, and institutional properties. They were designed in a variety of popular architectural styles, including Romanesque, Queen Anne, and Colonial Revival, and were laid out on a plan developed by Frederick Law Olmsted. Notable non-residential buildings include the casino, train station, company office building, and churches. The two contributing sites are landscaped parks.

It was added to the National Register of Historic Places in 1995.
