= Buffalo Township, Butler County, Pennsylvania =

Township in Pennsylvania, US

Coordinates: 40°42′24″N 79°44′33″W

- Township
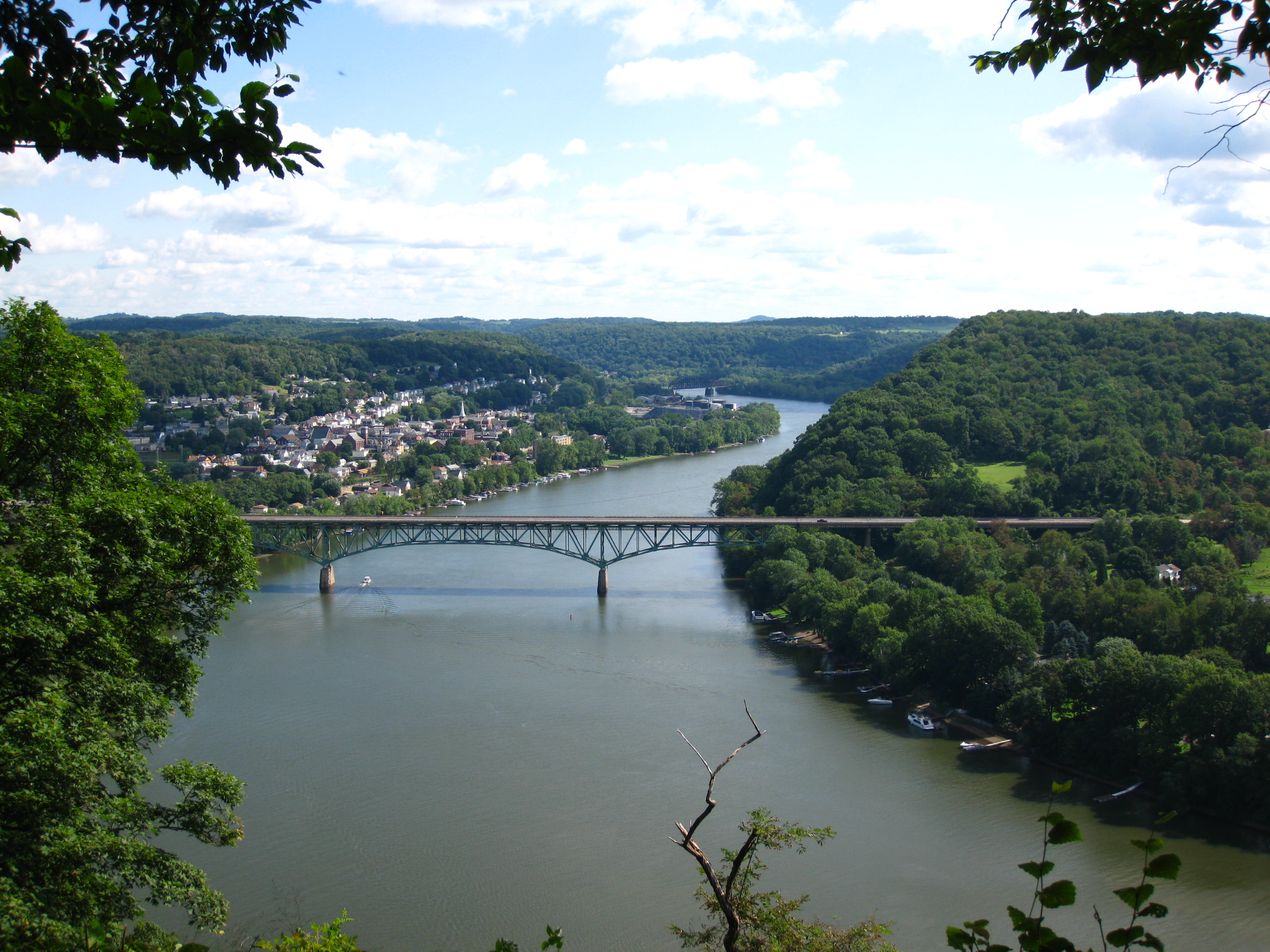
- Donald R. Lobaugh Bridge over the Allegheny River

- Logo

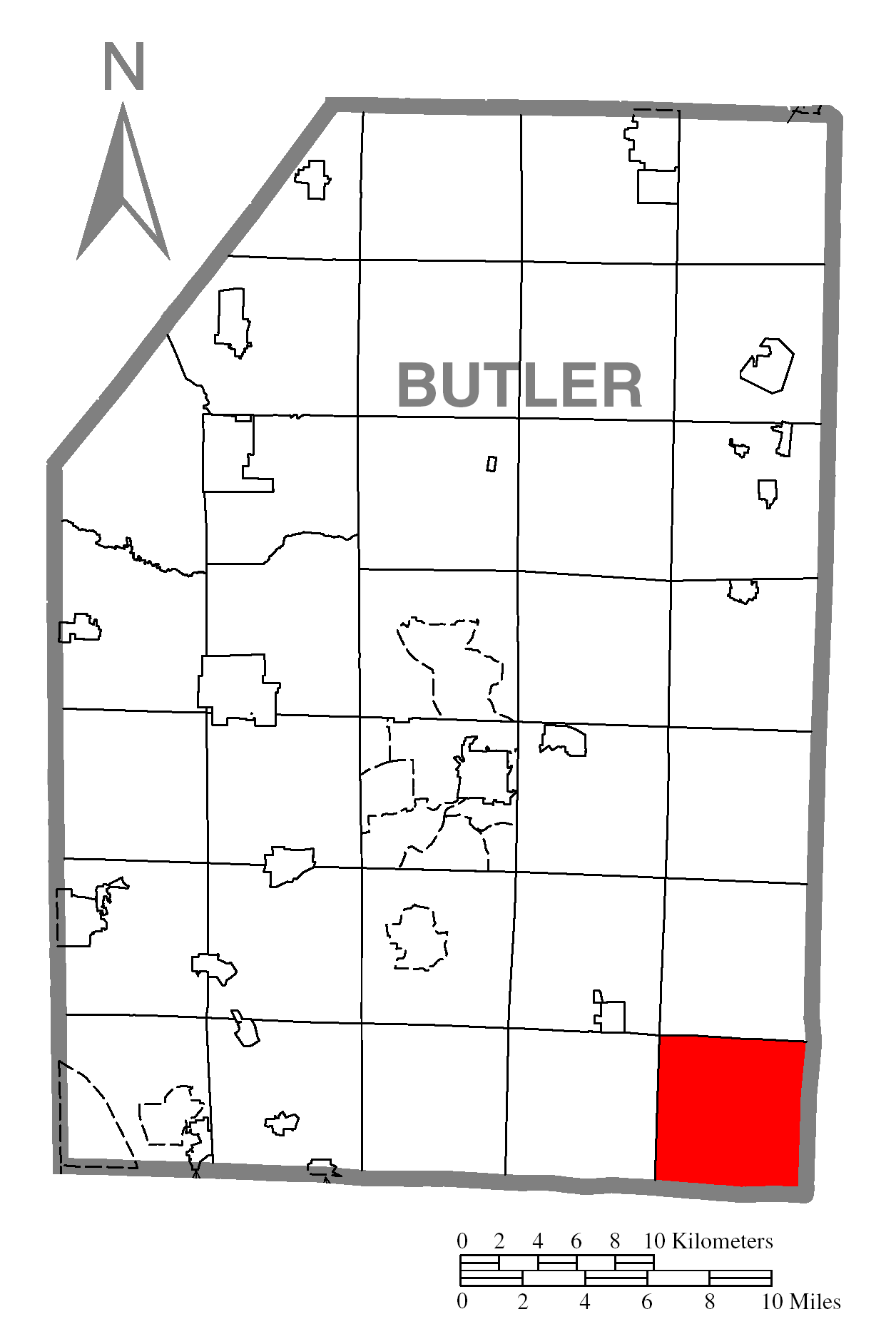
- Map of Butler County, Pennsylvania, highlighting Buffalo Township

- Map of Butler County, Pennsylvania
- Country: United States
- State: Pennsylvania
- County: Butler
- Settled: 1795
- Incorporated: 1803

Government
  - Type: Board of Supervisors
  - Chairman: Ron Zampogna (D)
  - Vice Chairman/Emergency Supervisor: Matt Sweeny (R)
  - Police Supervisor: Gary L. Risch Sr. (R)
  - Supervisor of Roads: Albert T. Roenigk (D)
  - Supervisor of Parks and Recreation, PSATS Delegate: Michael Oehling Jr. (R)

Area
  - Total: 24.36 sq mi (63.08 km^{2})
  - Land: 24.30 sq mi (62.93 km^{2})
  - Water: 0.058 sq mi (0.15 km^{2})

Population (2020)
  - Total: 7,896 ▲
  - Estimate (2022): 8,070
  - Density: 299.7/sq mi (115.72/km^{2})
- Time zone: UTC-5 (Eastern (EST))
  - Summer (DST): UTC-4 (EDT)
- Area code: 724
- FIPS code: 42-019-10000
- Website: buffalotownship.com

Buffalo Township is a township in Butler County, Pennsylvania, United States. The population was 7,896 at the 2020 census.

== Geography ==
Buffalo Township occupies the southeastern corner of Butler County. It is bordered to the west by Clinton Township, at its northwest corner by Jefferson Township, and to the north by Winfield Township. To the east are South Buffalo Township and the borough of Freeport in Armstrong County. To the south are Harrison and Fawn townships in Allegheny County. The southeast corner of Buffalo Township just touches the Allegheny River at the mouth of Buffalo Creek with Allegheny Township in Westmoreland County on the other side.

The township includes the unincorporated communities of Butler Junction, Silverville, Sarverville, Sarver, Ekastown, and Lernerville. Pennsylvania Route 28, a limited-access highway, passes through the southeastern part of the township, with access from Exit 17 (Pennsylvania Route 356, or Butler Road). Route 356 bisects the township from southeast to northwest.

According to the United States Census Bureau, Buffalo Township has a total area of 24.4 square miles (63.1 km^{2}), of which 24.3 square miles (62.9 km^{2}) is land and 0.04 square miles (0.1 km^{2}), or 0.24%, is water.

== Communities ==
- Sarvers Mills
- Twin Oaks
- Buffalo Estates
- Ridgeview Estates
- Chesterfield Estates
- Woodbury Village
- Buffalo Trails
- Edgewood
- High Point
- The Oaks
- Oak Creek
- Heritage Crossings
- Pine Ridge
- Laurel Hills

== Demographics ==
Historical population
Census	Pop.	Note	%±
2010	7,307		—
2020	7,896		8.1%
2022 (est.)	8,070		2.2%
U.S. Decennial Census

As of the 2000 census, there were 6,827 people, 2,521 households, and 2,006 families residing in the township. The population density was 282.7 inhabitants per square mile (109.2/km^{2}). There were 2,612 housing units at an average density of 108.2 per square mile (41.8/km^{2}). The racial makeup of the township was 98.9% White, 0.2% African American, 0.1% Native American, 0.3% Asian, and 0.2% from two or more races. Hispanic or Latino of any race were 0.3% of the population.

There were 2,521 households, out of which 34.5% had children under the age of 18 living with them, 69.1% were married couples living together, 7.0% had a female householder with no husband present, and 20.4% were non-families. 17.1% of all households were made up of individuals, and 8.0% had someone living alone who was 65 years of age or older. The average household size was 2.67 and the average family size was 3.02.

In the township the population was spread out, with 24.9% under the age of 18, 6.2% from 18 to 24, 28.0% from 25 to 44, 25.9% from 45 to 64, and 15.0% who were 65 years of age or older. The median age was 40 years. For every 100 females there were 98.9 males. For every 100 females age 18 and over, there were 96.1 males.

The median income for a household in the township was $45,074, and the median income for a family was $51,886. Males had a median income of $42,020 versus $23,692 for females. The per capita income for the township was $20,798. About 6.2% of families and 8.8% of the population were below the poverty line, including 9.8% of those under age 18 and 12.1% of those age 65 or over.

== Parks and recreation ==
The Todd Nature Reserve is located within the township.

The Buffalo Creek Nature Center is located within the township.

There are three trailheads of the Freeport-Butler Community Trail located in Buffalo township (Monroe road, Sarver road, Bearcreek road)

== Education ==
It is in the Freeport Area School District.

The district operates the following facilities within Sarver: the headquarters, Buffalo Elementary School, Freeport Area Middle School, and Freeport Area High School.

== See also ==
- Donald R. Lobaugh Bridge over the Allegheny River
