= Crooked Creek Lake Recreation Area =

Crooked Creek Lake
- Location within Pennsylvania Location within the United States
- Location: Armstrong County, Pennsylvania
- Coordinates: 40.699°N 79.499°W
- Type: reservoir
- Basin countries: United States

Crooked Creek Lake Recreation Area is a U.S. Army Corps of Engineers administered site surrounding Crooked Creek Lake in Armstrong County in the U.S. state of Pennsylvania. The reservoir was created by the construction of the Crooked Creek Dam, authorized by the Flood Control Acts of 1936 and 1938. This project is intended to control flooding along the Allegheny River basin. The area was previously known as Crooked Creek State Park. The long-distance Baker Trail traverses the recreation area.
