= Mendes Napoli =

President of Napoli Management Group

Mendes Napoli (born May 16, 1951) is president of Napoli Management Group, a talent agency specializing in the representation of television news broadcast journalists. After spending 23 years in television station and news management positions, he founded Napoli Management Group in 1993.

A native of Vandergrift, Pennsylvania, Napoli graduated from Cleveland State University with a BA in communications in 1973. His broadcast career began as an associate news producer and later as a documentary and specials producer for WEWS-TV in Cleveland. At the age of 25 in 1976, he was appointed to news director of WPTV in West Palm Beach. From 1978 to 1981, he was news director and then assistant general manager of KJRH-TV in Tulsa.

In 1981, he was hired by General Electric Broadcasting Company as vice president and general manager of their station in Nashville at age 29. He was responsible for rebuilding the station's ratings performance and its news image. From 1984 to 1988, Napoli was the vice president of news for Scripps Howard Broadcasting Company. He oversaw the news and local programming at the company's television stations including WXYZ Detroit, WEWS Cleveland and WCPO Cincinnati. From 1988 to 1993 he served as vice president of news for Hubbard Broadcasting's KSTP in Minneapolis-St. Paul.

Mendes Napoli currently resides in Los Angeles.
