= Steve Jastrzembski =

American football player (1939–2009)

No. 87
- Position: End

Personal information
- Born: August 27, 1939; Vandergrift, Pennsylvania, U.S.
- Died: January 14, 2009 (aged 69); Los Angeles, California, U.S.
- Listed height: 6 ft 3 in (1.91 m)
- Listed weight: 203 lb (92 kg)

Career information
- High school: Vandergrift (PA)
- College: Pittsburgh
- NFL draft: 1961: 17th round, 231 (by Baltimore Colts)th overall pick
- AFL draft: 1962: 33rd round, 262 (by Boston Patriots)th overall pick

Career history
- Toronto Argonauts (1962)*
- * Offseason or practice squad member only

Steve Vincent Jastrzembski (August 27, 1939 – January 14, 2009) was an American football end who played college football for the Pittsburgh Panthers. He was selected in both the 1961 NFL draft and 1962 AFL draft, but did not play professionally.

== Early life and education ==
Jastrzembski was born on August 27, 1939, in Vandergrift, Pennsylvania. He attended Vandergrift High School, graduating in 1957, before joining the University of Pittsburgh. During his first two years with the team, he did not see much action and was a backup end.

He developed into one of the favorite targets of quarterback Ivan Toncic in 1959, along with future Pro Football Hall of Famer Mike Ditka, who also played the end position. In a week-three 25–21 comeback win over UCLA, Jastrzembski caught the game-winning touchdown from Toncic with seconds left, and was carried off the field by teammates. He totaled 105 receiving yards on five receptions against UCLA, earning him "sophomore of the week" honors from his conference.

Early in his career with Pittsburgh, Jastrzembski had "butter fingers now and then", but became better at catching the ball after taping his hands prior to each game, something he read Raymond Berry had done.

At the school, he was nicknamed "Jazz", as many of his teammates and teachers could not correctly pronounce his surname. "For one professor, I had to pronounce my name every day," Jastrzembski said. "He'd say, 'Oh, I've got it now,' and then mispronounce it again. I felt like telling him, 'Just call me Jazz.'"

As a junior in 1960, he finished the season with second-team all-state honors, only behind teammate Mike Ditka. He earned a starting role in 1961, after Ditka graduated.

== Professional career ==
Jastrzembski was drafted in both the 1961 NFL draft (by the Baltimore Colts) and the 1962 AFL draft (by the Boston Patriots), but declined both teams' offers. He instead signed a contract in the Canadian Football League (CFL) with the Toronto Argonauts.

== Later life and death ==
After being released by the Argonauts, he returned to the University of Pittsburgh in 1963, studying at their dental school. After his graduating in 1965, he served 25 years in the United States Army, retiring at the rank of colonel. For the last eight years of his life, he was a pediatric dentist in the army, stationed in Wiesbaden, Germany. He died on January 14, 2009, at the age of 69.
