= Sarver, Pennsylvania =

Unincorporated community in Pennsylvania, U.S.

Coordinates: 40°43′53″N 79°44′45″W

Sarver is an unincorporated community in Buffalo Township, Butler County, Pennsylvania. It is located in the south-eastern part of the county. Sarver is generally known as most of the area near and west/southwest of State Route 356 (Butler Road/South Pike Road/North Pike Road) in the township. Until around the late 1990s- early 2000s, Sarver was home to only a few residents. Its economy was very small and was based solely on a grocery store, a few small restaurants, along with a few gas stations and car dealerships. It has since grown to hold many new medium to high income housing plans, with the addition of many new shopping centers and businesses. The ZIP code is 16055. The population of the zip code is 8,486.

== Education ==
School-age residents of Buffalo Township are zoned to Freeport Area School District. The district operates the following facilities within Sarver: the headquarters, Buffalo Elementary School, Freeport Area Middle School, and Freeport Area High School.

== Notable people ==
- Michele McDonald, model and pageant winner
- Corey Comperatore, rallygoer killed during an Attempted Assassination of Donald Trump in Butler, Pennsylvania
