= Freeport, Pennsylvania =

Borough in Pennsylvania, US

- Borough
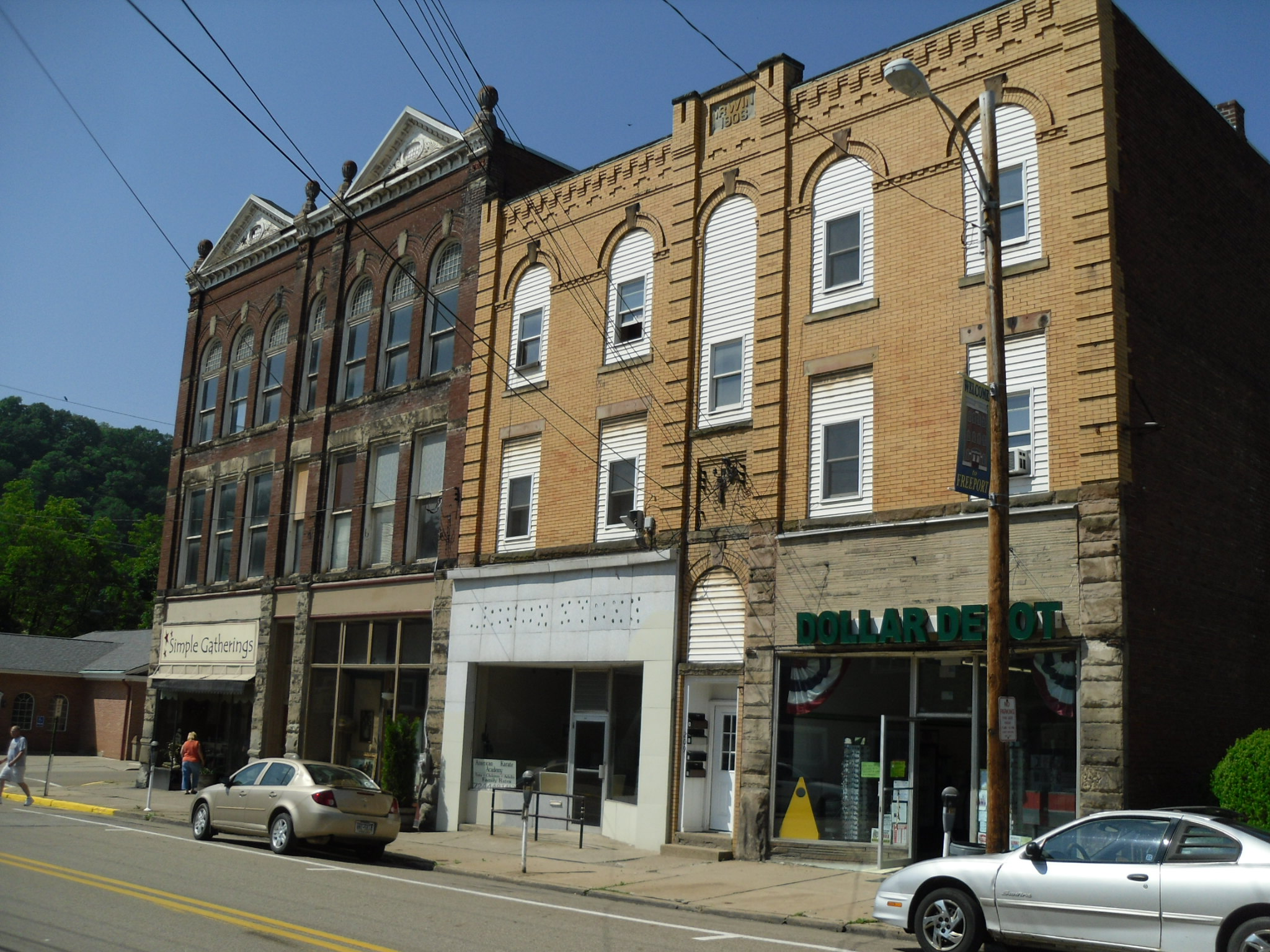
- Downtown Freeport

- Location of Freeport in Armstrong County, Pennsylvania

- Location within Pennsylvania
- Coordinates: 40°40′28″N 79°41′11″W
- Country: United States
- State: Pennsylvania
- County: Armstrong
- Settled: 1796
- Incorporated: 1833

Government
  - Type: Borough council
  - Mayor: Matt Crytzer

Area
  - Total: 1.30 sq mi (3.36 km^{2})
  - Land: 1.27 sq mi (3.29 km^{2})
  - Water: 0.027 sq mi (0.07 km^{2})
- Elevation: 790 ft (240 m)

Population (2020)
  - Total: 1,736
  - Density: 1,367.5/sq mi (527.98/km^{2})
- Time zone: UTC-5 (Eastern (EST))
  - Summer (DST): UTC-4 (EDT)
- Zip Code: 16229
- Area codes: 724, 878
- FIPS code: 42-27784
- Website: https://freeportpa.com/

Freeport is a borough in Armstrong County, Pennsylvania, United States. It is situated along the Allegheny River in the southwestern corner of the county. The population was 1,736 at the 2020 census.

== History ==
The first settlement was made at Freeport in the 1760s. Freeport received its name from David Todd, who declared it a free and open port. The borough was incorporated in 1833. Freeport was a port on the former Pennsylvania Canal.

Twenty-seven lots on the lands became Freeport borough, and were conveyed by William and David Todd for $24 each in 1797. This land was originally part of Westmoreland County, but by the time the town was laid out, it had been made part of Allegheny County.

This land was originally called Todd's Town after the founding Todd family, and it would go by this name until its incorporation in 1833. A proclamation by David Todd gave the town the name of Freeport. Todd said: "all the ground between the houses on Water Street and the river shall be free to all the lot-owners, and that boats, rafts, and other river craft landing here should be free of wharfage. Ever since the laying out of the town, it is a free port for all the river craft; so, this town christened by the proprietors has ever since been called Freeport."

Freeport's position on the Allegheny river gave it an ideal spot for industry and trade going to Pittsburgh. It had several industrial businesses throughout the 19th century, including the Lucesco Oil Refinery and the Freeport Brick Company. Remains of these businesses can still be seen on the river, and are sometimes mistaken for the remains of the old Pennsylvania canal.

Freeport P.O. appears in the 1876 atlas of Armstrong County, Pennsylvania. Its early history is detailed in Robert Walter Smith's 1883 History of Armstrong County. A more recent account of Freeport's history up to 2018 was published by Steven Gardner.

== Geography ==
Freeport is located at 40°40′28″N 79°41′11″W (40.674337, –79.686320). According to the U.S. Census Bureau, the borough has a total area of 1.3 square miles (3.4 km^{2}), of which 1.3 square miles (3.3 km^{2}) is land and 0.039 square miles (0.1 km^{2}), or 2.20%, is water.

The Kiskiminetas River joins the Allegheny River near Freeport; specifically on its eastern bank between Schenley and Kiskiminetas Junction, less than one mile northeast of Freeport.

Buffalo Creek enters the Allegheny River on its western bank at Freeport.

== Demographics ==
Historical population
Census	Pop.	Note	%±
1840	727		—
1850	1,073		47.6%
1860	1,701		58.5%
1870	1,640		−3.6%
1880	1,614		−1.6%
1890	1,637		1.4%
1900	1,754		7.1%
1910	2,248		28.2%
1920	2,696		19.9%
1930	2,772		2.8%
1940	2,710		−2.2%
1950	2,685		−0.9%
1960	2,439		−9.2%
1970	2,375		−2.6%
1980	2,381		0.3%
2000	1,962		—
2010	1,813		−7.6%
2020	1,736		−4.2%
2023 (est.)	1,693	▼	−2.5%

As of the 2000 census, there were 1,962 people, 878 households, and 532 families residing in the borough. The population density was 1,697.9 inhabitants per square mile (655.6/km^{2}). There were 944 housing units at an average density of 816.9 per square mile (315.4/km^{2}). The racial makeup of the borough was 98.42% White, 0.25% African American, 0.25% Asian, 0.05% Pacific Islander, 0.41% from other races, and 0.61% from two or more races. Hispanic or Latino people of any race were 0.46% of the population.

There were 878 households, out of which 26.7% had children under the age of 18 living with them, 44.6% were married couples living together, 12.1% had a female householder with no husband present, and 39.4% were non-families. 36.4% of all households were made up of individuals, and 20.5% had someone living alone who was 65 years of age or older. The average household size was 2.23 and the average family size was 2.94.

In the borough, the population was spread out, with 22.3% under the age of 18, 7.3% from 18 to 24, 29.1% from 25 to 44, 21.9% from 45 to 64, and 19.4% who were 65 years of age or older. The median age was 39 years. For every 100 females, there were 86.0 males. For every 100 females age 18 and over, there were 81.3 males.

The median income for a household in the borough was $28,565, and the median income for a family was $40,000. Males had a median income of $31,397 versus $21,690 for females. The per capita income for the borough was $16,845. About 8.0% of families and 10.4% of the population were below the poverty line, including 8.4% of those under age 18 and 13.2% of those age 65 or over.

== Education ==
The Freeport Area School District serves the borough.

Freeport was formerly home to Freeport Elementary School at 408 High Street, where all borough students attended kindergarten through sixth grade. In 2005, the school district decided to convert the school into the district's Kindergarten Center, where all of the district's students attended kindergarten until 2014. In 2014, the Kindergarten Center was closed and students attending were moved to the Elementary schools in Buffalo and South Buffalo Townships.

Completely new, or extensively remodeled Elementary School buildings were built between 2011 and 2013. Currently, the borough elementary students (grades K–5) attend either Buffalo Elementary in Sarver, or South Buffalo Elementary in South Buffalo Township.

Grades 6–8 now attend the Freeport Middle School, a new facility opened in fall 2015 on the High School campus at 629 South Pike Road in Buffalo Township. Like the Kindergarten center, Freeport Junior High School was also formerly located in the town limits, at 325 4th Street and was permanently closed after the spring commencement in 2015.

Students attend ninth through twelfth grade at Freeport Area Senior High School, at 621 South Pike Road in Buffalo Township.

The Freeport sports teams are known as the Yellow Jackets. Until the close of the 2015–16 school year, all of the district's varsity football home games were held at James Swartz Sr. Memorial Field in the borough. The field was also used for some varsity and junior varsity baseball games, and varsity boys' and girls' soccer games. A new stadium was completed at the High School campus in Buffalo Township. It opened in the fall of 2016. Beginning with the opening of the new Middle School building on the High School campus, band, chorus and other stage performances were moved to the new Middle School auditorium, which is now the largest and best equipped venue in the school district.

== Government ==
Freeport's fire and rescue coverage is provided by Freeport Volunteer Fire Department, located at 400 Market Street. The department operates two engines, a rescue, a squad, and a river rescue boat with over 40 volunteers.

Medical coverage is provided by Freeport Emergency Medical Services. Freeport EMS utilizes three ALS certified ambulances with 13 paramedics and 17 EMTs.

== In popular culture ==
Freeport was the setting for a scene in Episode 8 of NBC's television series Revolution, which aired in November 2012. The main characters are ambushed while trying to cross a bridge over the Allegheny River. They are turned back, and subsequently decide to attempt another bridge crossing in nearby Ford City, Pennsylvania.

== Notable people ==
- David Alter, scientist and inventor
- Red Bowser, former professional baseball player, Chicago White Sox
- Bud Carson, former NFL coach
- Greg Christy, former professional American football player
- Jeff Christy, former professional American football player
- Ella M. George, teacher, lecturer, social reformer
- Donald R. Lobaugh, U.S. Army soldier and Medal of Honor recipient in World War II
- Timothy Pesci, Pennsylvania state legislator
- Eric Ravotti, former NFL (Steeler) player
- Don Taylor, actor and director

== See also ==
- Baker Trail, a hiking trail whose southern terminus is across the river from Freeport
- Donald R. Lobaugh Bridge, spanning the Allegheny River between Freeport and Allegheny Township
