= St. Gertrude Roman Catholic Church =

Historic church in Pennsylvania, United States

- U.S. National Register of Historic Places
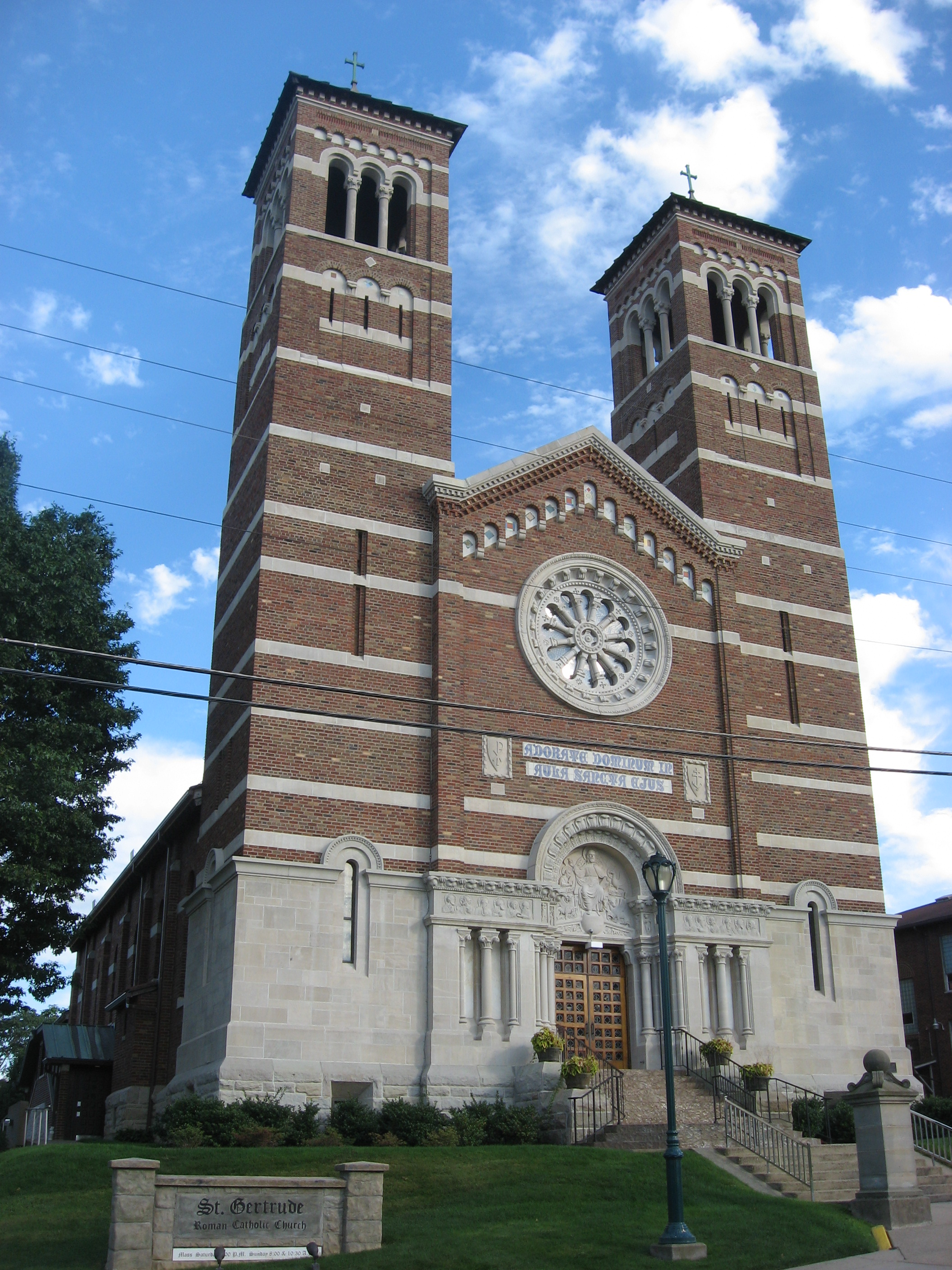
- Front and northern side

- Location within Pennsylvania Location within the United States
- Location: 311 Franklin Ave., Vandergrift, Pennsylvania
- Coordinates: 40°35′59″N 79°33′52″W
- Area: 0.4 acres (0.16 ha)
- Built: 1911
- Architect: John T. Comes; Dusquesne Construction Company
- Architectural style: Romanesque
- NRHP reference No.: 83002287
- Added to NRHP: September 23, 1983

St. Gertrude Roman Catholic Church is a historic Catholic church located at 311 Franklin Avenue in Vandergrift, Westmoreland County, Pennsylvania within the Diocese of Greensburg.

It was added to the National Register of Historic Places in 1983.

== Description ==
St. Gertrude church was designed by architect John T. Comes and built in 1911. It is a basilica plan church in the Italian Romanesque Revival style. The front façade features a central pavilion that slightly projects from two campanilles and a 13-light rose window.

The church grounds consist of three buildings: the church itself, a pastoral rectory, and Cardinal Maida Academy, which provides education for students from kindergarten through sixth grade. Between the church and school once stood a fourth building...a convent in use by the Benedictine Sisters, who taught at the school until the end of the 20th Century, when sisters were replaced by state-certified teachers to comply with federal and state Department of Education requirements. The convent was demolished in the early 21st Century, and the church parking lot has been expanded to the convent grounds.

Many of the Benedictine Sisters who taught at the school stayed in active ministry and were transferred to Benedictine Sisters of Pittsburgh, a merged convent in Bakerstown, Pennsylvania.

The front of the church bears the phrase "Adorate dominum in aula sancta ejus", which translated into English, means "Worship the Lord in his holy court."

The church also has a custom-designed, state-of-the-art electro-mechanical bell chime system designed by Schulmerich Carillons in Sellersville, Pennsylvania.

St. Gertrude Church is also the administrator for Cardinal Maida Academy, originally known as "St. Gertrude School", located next to the Church at 315 Franklin Avenue in Vandergrift.
