= Oklahoma, Pennsylvania =

Borough in Pennsylvania, US

- Borough
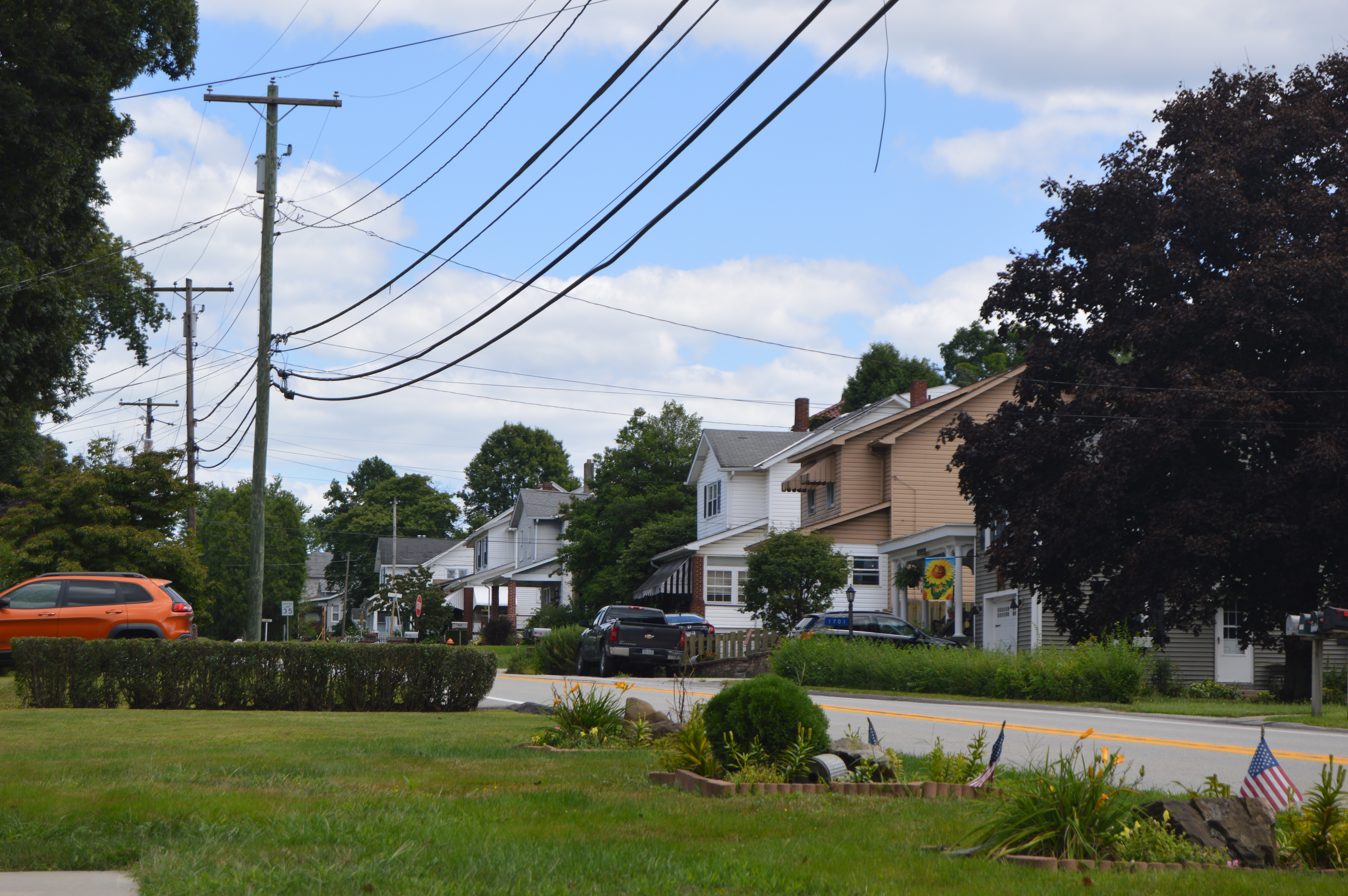
- Hancock Street residential area

- Location of Oklahoma in Westmoreland County, Pennsylvania.

- Location within Pennsylvania
- Coordinates: 40°34′54″N 79°34′29″W
- Country: United States
- State: Pennsylvania
- County: Westmoreland
- Incorporated: 1931

Government
  - Type: Borough Council

Area
  - Total: 0.64 sq mi (1.66 km^{2})
  - Land: 0.61 sq mi (1.57 km^{2})
  - Water: 0.035 sq mi (0.09 km^{2})
- Elevation: 1,056 ft (322 m)

Population (2020)
  - Total: 788
  - Density: 1,298.6/sq mi (501.39/km^{2})
- Time zone: UTC-5 (Eastern (EST))
  - Summer (DST): UTC-4 (EDT)
- FIPS code: 42-56496

Oklahoma is a borough in Westmoreland County, Pennsylvania, United States. As of the 2020 census, Oklahoma had a population of 788.

== Geography ==
Oklahoma is located at 40°34′54″N 79°34′29″W (40.581613, -79.574586).

According to the United States Census Bureau, the borough has a total area of 0.8 square miles (2.1 km^{2}), of which 0.7 square miles (1.8 km^{2}) is land and 0.04 square miles (0.10 km^{2}) (5.06%) is water.

== Surrounding communities ==
Oklahoma has two land borders, including the townships of Washington to the south and Allegheny to the northwest.

Across the Kiskiminetas River to the east, Oklahoma runs adjacent with the Armstrong County municipalities of (from north to south) North Apollo, Apollo (with a connector via 1st Street Bridge), and Kiskiminetas Township.

== Demographics ==
Historical population
Census	Pop.	Note	%±
1940	868		—
1950	930		7.1%
1960	983		5.7%
1970	1,084		10.3%
1980	1,078		−0.6%
1990	977		−9.4%
2000	915		−6.3%
2010	809		−11.6%
2020	788		−2.6%

At the time of the 2000 census, there were 915 people, 375 households, and 270 families living in the borough.

The population density was 1,233.0 inhabitants per square mile (476.1/km^{2}). There were 390 housing units at an average density of 525.5 per square mile (202.9/km^{2}).

The racial makeup of the borough was 98.91% White, 0.66% African American, and 0.44% from two or more races. Hispanic or Latino of any race were 0.22%.

Of the 375 households 31.5% had children under the age of 18 living with them, 56.0% were married couples living together, 10.9% had a female householder with no husband present, and 28.0% were non-families. 24.5% of households were one person and 14.4% were one person aged 65 or older. The average household size was 2.44 and the average family size was 2.89.

The age distribution was 24.2% under the age of 18, 5.9% from 18 to 24, 27.0% from 25 to 44, 24.6% from 45 to 64, and 18.4% 65 or older. The median age was 41 years.

For every 100 females, there were 86.4 males. For every 100 females age 18 and over, there were 87.1 males.

The median household income was $38,667 and the median family income was $41,477. Males had a median income of $35,313 compared with that of $23,750 for females.

The per capita income for the borough was $17,547.

Roughly 4.7% of families and 6.7% of the population were below the poverty line, including 4.6% of those under age 18 and 10.3% of those age 65 or over.
