= Vandergrift, Pennsylvania =

Borough in Pennsylvania, US

- Borough
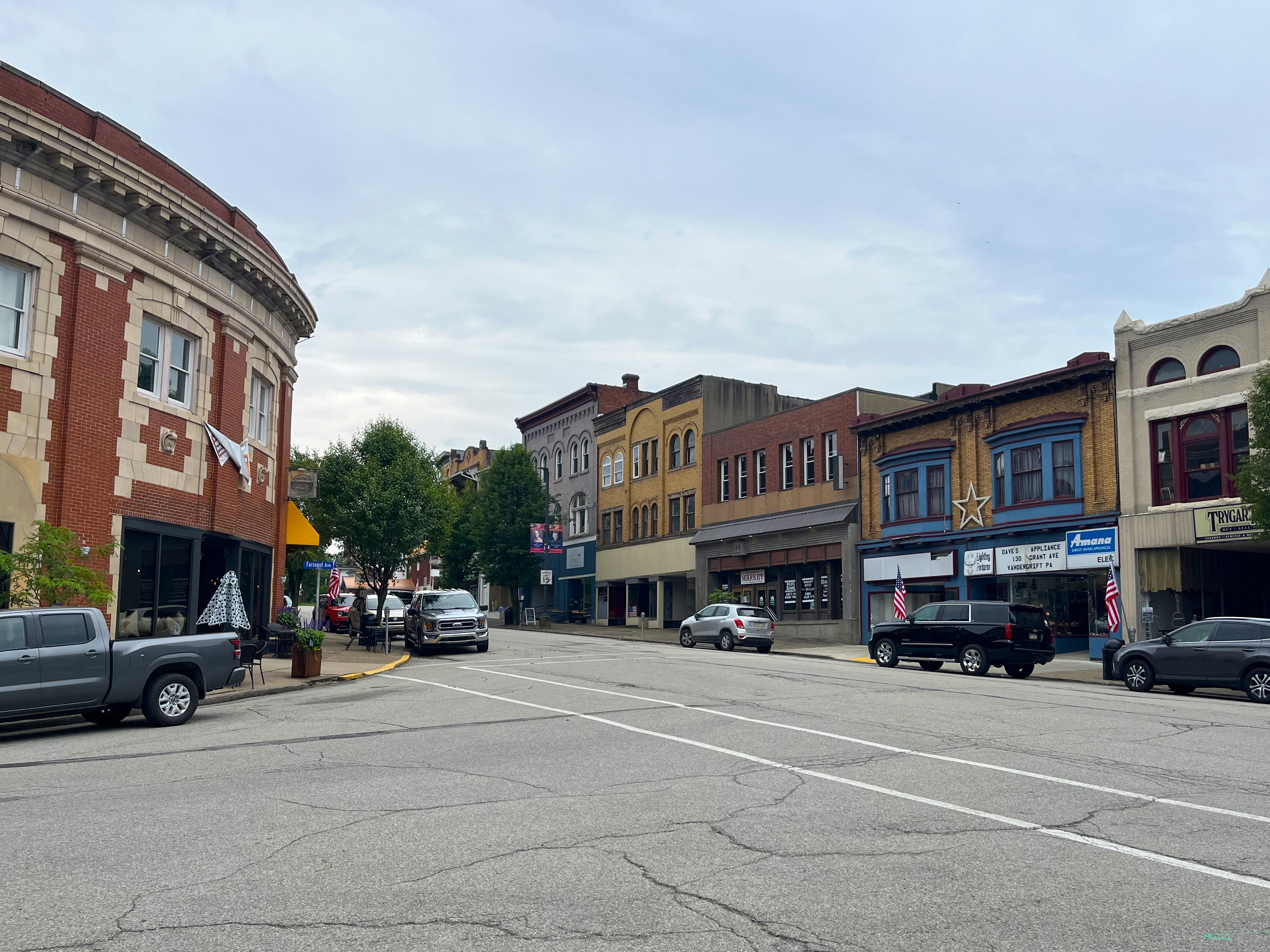
- Downtown Vandergrift

- Location in Westmoreland County and the U.S. state of Pennsylvania.

- Location within Pennsylvania Location within the United States
- Coordinates: 40°35′58″N 79°34′11″W
- Country: United States
- State: Pennsylvania
- County: Westmoreland
- Settled: 1895

Government
  - Type: Borough Council
  - Mayor: Lenny Collini
  - Council: Tom Holmes President

Area
  - Total: 1.42 sq mi (3.68 km^{2})
  - Land: 1.36 sq mi (3.52 km^{2})
  - Water: 0.058 sq mi (0.15 km^{2})
- Elevation: 879 ft (268 m)

Population (2020)
  - Total: 5,075
  - Density: 3,730.1/sq mi (1,440.21/km^{2})
- Time zone: UTC-5 (Eastern (EST))
  - Summer (DST): UTC-4 (EDT)
- Zip code: 15690
- Area code: 724
- FIPS code: 42-79776
- Website: https://vandergriftborough.com/

Vandergrift is a borough in Westmoreland County in the U.S. state of Pennsylvania, approximately 30 miles (48 km) northeast of Pittsburgh. In the early 20th century, Vandergrift had the largest sheet steel mill in the world.

On June 28, 1915, the Borough of Vandergrift Heights was consolidated with Vandergrift. As of the 2020 census, Vandergrift had a population of 5,075.

== Etymology ==
Dutch (Van der Grift): topographic name from Middle Dutch grifte ‘man-made channel', a surname subsequently adopted by the Van der Grift family who served as the town’s mayors for five consequent generations.

== History ==
Vandergrift, Pennsylvania – before and after

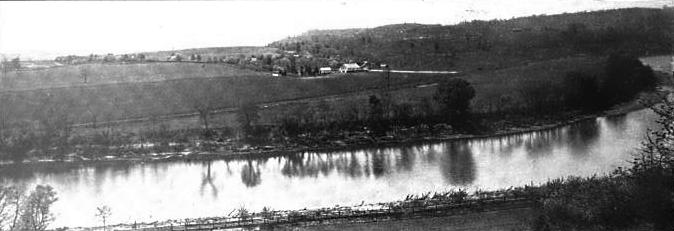
July 1895, before construction of the town

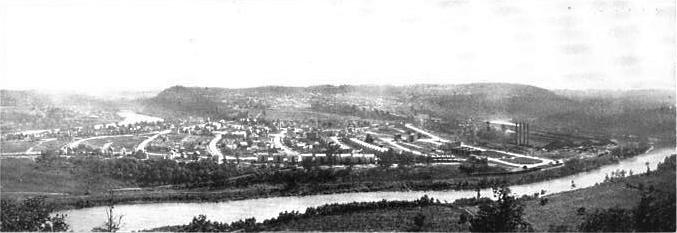
May 1896

In the 1890s the Apollo Iron and Steel Company was in a dramatic round of industrial restructuring and labor tension, ending a bitterly contested labor dispute at its Apollo, Pennsylvania, steelworks by hiring replacement workers from the surrounding countryside. To avoid future unrest, the company sought tighter control over its workers, not only at the factory, but also in their homes. Drawing upon a philosophy of reform movements in Europe and the United States, the company's leader, George McMurtry, adopted what was later known as welfare capitalism, with the company going beyond paychecks to provide for the social needs of the workers, and providing a benign physical environment and good housing, to make for happier and more productive workers. Wanting a loyal workforce, McMurtry developed a town agenda that drew upon environmentalism as well as popular attitudes toward capital's treatment of labor.

In 1895, Apollo Iron and Steel built a new, integrated, non-unionized steelworks and hired the nation's preeminent landscape architectural firm, Olmsted, Olmsted and Eliot, to design the model industrial town, to be named Vandergrift (for Capt. J.J. Vandergrift, a director of the steel company). The Olmsted firm translated this agenda into an urban design that included a novel combination of social reform, comprehensive infrastructure planning, and private homeownership principles. The rates of homeownership and cordial relationships between the steel company and Vandergrift residents fostered loyalty among McMurtry's skilled workers and led to McMurtry's greatest success. In 1901 he used Vandergrift's worker-residents to break the first major strike against the United States Steel Corporation.

St. Gertrude Roman Catholic Church and the Vandergrift Historic District are listed on the National Register of Historic Places.

== Geography ==
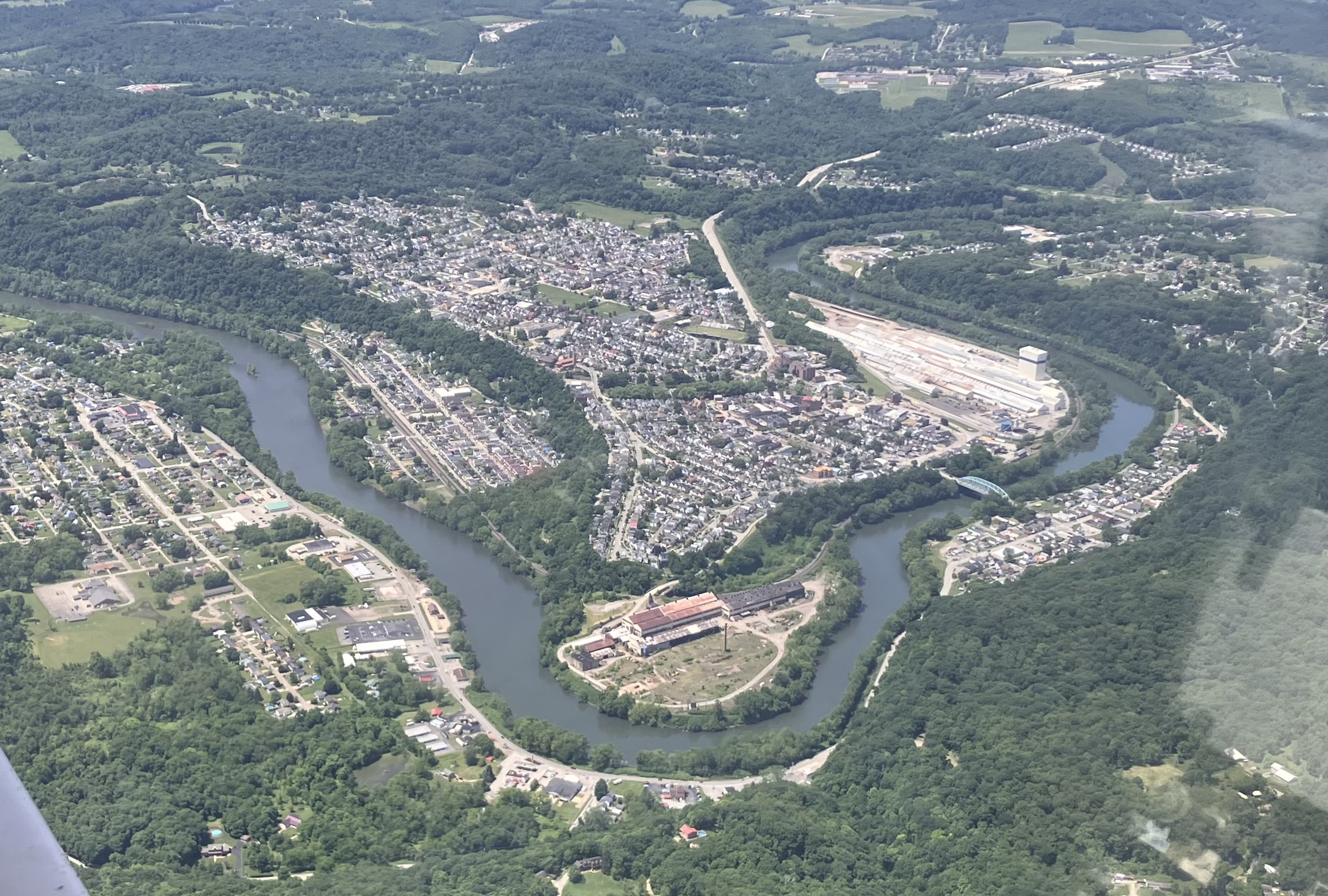
Aerial photograph of the borough from 1500ft above the ground.

According to the United States Census Bureau, the borough has a total area of 1.3 square miles (3.4 km^{2}), of which 1.2 square miles (3.1 km^{2}) is land and 0.1 square miles (0.26 km^{2}) (5.34%) is water.

=== Climate ===
Vandergrift has a humid continental climate, featuring an average low temperature of 22 degrees in January and an average high temperature of 82 degrees in July.

== Demographics ==
Historical population
Census	Pop.	Note	%±
1900	2,076		—
1910	3,876		86.7%
1920	9,531		145.9%
1930	11,479		20.4%
1940	10,725		−6.6%
1950	9,524		−11.2%
1960	8,742		−8.2%
1970	7,889		−9.8%
1980	6,823		−13.5%
1990	5,904		−13.5%
2000	5,455		−7.6%
2010	5,205		−4.6%
2020	5,075		−2.5%
U.S. Decennial Census

As of the census of 2000, there were 5,455 people, 2,414 households, and 1,489 families residing in the borough. The population density was 4,389.9 inhabitants per square mile (1,694.9/km^{2}). There were 2,772 housing units at an average density of 2,230.8 per square mile (861.3/km^{2}). The racial makeup of the borough was 97.43% White, .45% African American, 0.20% Native American, 0.24% Asian, 0.02% Pacific Islander, 0.16% from other races, and 1.50% from two or more races. Hispanic or Latino of any race were 0.37% of the population.

There were 2,414 households, out of which 25.3% had children under the age of 18 living with them, 43.7% were married couples living together, 14.1% had a female householder with no husband present, and 38.3% were non-families. 33.5% of all households were made up of individuals, and 19.5% had someone living alone who was 65 years of age or older. The average household size was 2.26 and the average family size was 2.87.

In the borough the population was spread out, with 21.9% under the age of 18, 6.7% from 18 to 24, 28.0% from 25 to 44, 20.4% from 45 to 64, and 23.0% who were 65 years of age or older. The median age was 40 years. For every 100 females there were 86.9 males. For every 100 females age 18 and over, there were 81.7 males.

The median income for a household in the borough was $26,935, and the median income for a family was $35,984. Males had a median income of $29,781 versus $20,829 for females. The per capita income for the borough was $16,285. About 12.0% of families and 15.9% of the population were below the poverty line, including 26.9% of those under age 18 and 13.9% of those age 65 or over.

=== Ancestries ===
People of Italian ancestry account for 68.7% of the population. People of Irish ancestry are another sizable group, at 16.4%. Other ancestries include Polish, at 8.3% and Slovak, at 6.6%.

== Arts and culture ==
=== Entertainment ===
Vandergrift has a theater - the Casino Theater, and a museum called the Victorian Vandergrift Museum & Historical Society.

Many of the exterior shots in the 2011 science fiction film I am Number Four were filmed in Vandergrift, which was a stand-in for the fictional town of Paradise, Ohio.

The city center was a reference for the town center of Possum Springs in the lauded PC game Night in the Woods.

Later seasons of the show Banshee were filmed in the town.

=== Festivals and parades ===
May

- "Vandergrift Cleanup Day".
- "Vandergrift Ethnic Days". The carnival and ethnic food festival takes place at Kennedy Park and is sponsored by Vandergrift Fire Companies Nos. 1 and 2.
- Memorial Day. A parade begins at Vandergrift Elementary School and proceeds down Grant Ave. to a veteran's memorial service at the Casino Theatre.

June

- "Vandergrift Fine Arts Festival".

July

- "RFG Sideshow Festival". This festival is free admission to the public. Enjoy good food, great music and dancing and the best entertainment this side of the Kiskiminetas River! Brought to you by RFG Association of Performing Arts and Vandergrift Vol. Fire Department no.2
- "

August

- "Festa Italiana di Vandergrift".

September

- "Tour de StrongLand ".

October

- "Vandergrift Oktoberfest". This usually a three-day festival held in Kennedy Park by the Vandergrift No. 2 Volunteer Fire Department.

November

- "Lightup the Night". This is the annual Christmas parade and celebration on Grant Ave. the Friday after Thanksgiving.

=== Religion ===
64.19% of Vandergrift residents are affiliated with a religious congregation. Of those affiliated, 55.4% are Roman Catholic, 12.2% are Methodist, 9.9% are ELCA Lutheran, 6.5% are Presbyterian, 16% are "other".

== Sports ==
Vandergrift borough is the owner of Davis Field, the former football home of the Cavaliers, Kiski Area School District's football team. A baseball field and football practice field also lie between Davis Field and Kennedy Memorial Park, which sits at the corner of Jackson and Walnut Streets. The fields serve local little league and midget football play.

== Politics ==
=== Borough council ===
Vandergrift has a weak mayor-council government system. In a "weak" mayor-council system. The mayor of Vandergrift is Lenny Collini. Vandergrift Borough Council is elected every two years.

=== State representation ===
At the state level, Vandergrift is within Pennsylvania's 60th House of Representatives District, represented by Abby Major (R). Vandergrift is also within the 41st Senatorial District represented by Sen. Joe Pittman (R).

=== Congressional representation ===
Federally, Vandergrift is part of Pennsylvania's 14th Congressional District, represented by Guy Reschenthaler (R). The state's senior member of the United States Senate is Democrat John Fetterman, elected in 2022. The state's junior member of the United States Senate is Republican Dave McCormick, elected in 2024.

== Education ==
=== Public ===
Vandergrift is within the Kiski Area School District.

=== Private ===
The former St. Gertrude School in Vandergrift, which was established in 1922, served students in kindergarten through sixth grade, until it officially transitioned to a regional school with a new name in fall 2005. The formal announcement and dedication of the Cardinal Maida Academy took place with a special Mass November 27, 2005, at St. Gertrude Parish, and Cardinal Adam J. Maida, whose episcopal motto is “To Make All Things New,” returned to his roots in the Diocese of Greensburg to help a small Catholic school celebrate a new beginning.

== Media ==
=== Newspaper ===
The area is served by the Valley News Dispatch, a daily newspaper serving the Alle-Kiski Valley. Until the mid-1980s, this newspaper maintained a branch sales office in Parks Township, across the river from Vandergrift. It was also served by its own local newspaper, The News-Citizen, which maintained an office on Walnut Street, started as a daily newspaper, before reducing to a weekly publication by the mid-1980s. It ceased publication by the end of the 20th century.

=== Radio ===
Vandergrift is served locally in part by radio station WJFA, licensed to Apollo, Pennsylvania.

=== Television ===
Vandergrift is in the Pittsburgh Metropolitan Area television market, and is served by KDKA-TV (CBS), WPGH-TV (FOX), WPXI (NBC), WQED-TV (PBS), and WTAE-TV (ABC).

== Transportation ==
The Westmoreland County Transit Authority provides service to Vandergrift directly via the Route 15 bus. It runs Monday-Friday from 8:00am to 4:30pm between New Kensington and Avonmore. It stops at McMutury Towers, Jackson/Longfellow Avenues, and Grant/Sumner Avenues six times a day. About 2 miles from downtown Vandergrift, the Route 14F bus, from New Kensington to Pittsburgh, and the Route 12 bus, from New Kensington to Greensburg, both stop in the Allegheny Plaza parking lot

== Notable people ==
- Jaira Burns (born 1997), American singer-songwriter
- Angelo Donghia (1935–1985), American interior designer
- Anthony E. Gallo (born 1939), American playwright
- Steve Jastrzembski (1939–2009), American football player
- Mendes Napoli (born 1951), American businessman and talent agent
- Lou Palatella (born 1933), American football player
- William Perry (born 1927), American mathematician, engineer, businessman, politician, and former United States Secretary of Defense
- David Roselle (1939-2024), American mathematician and academic administrator who served as the ninth President of the University of Kentucky and the 25th President of the University of Delaware.
- Warren Schaeffer (1985-), manager of the Colorado Rockies as of the 2026 season
- James Veneris (1922–2004), American soldier captured by the Chinese during the Korean War, and refused to return to the United States afterwards

== See also ==
- East Vandergrift, Pennsylvania
