= Donald R. Lobaugh Bridge =

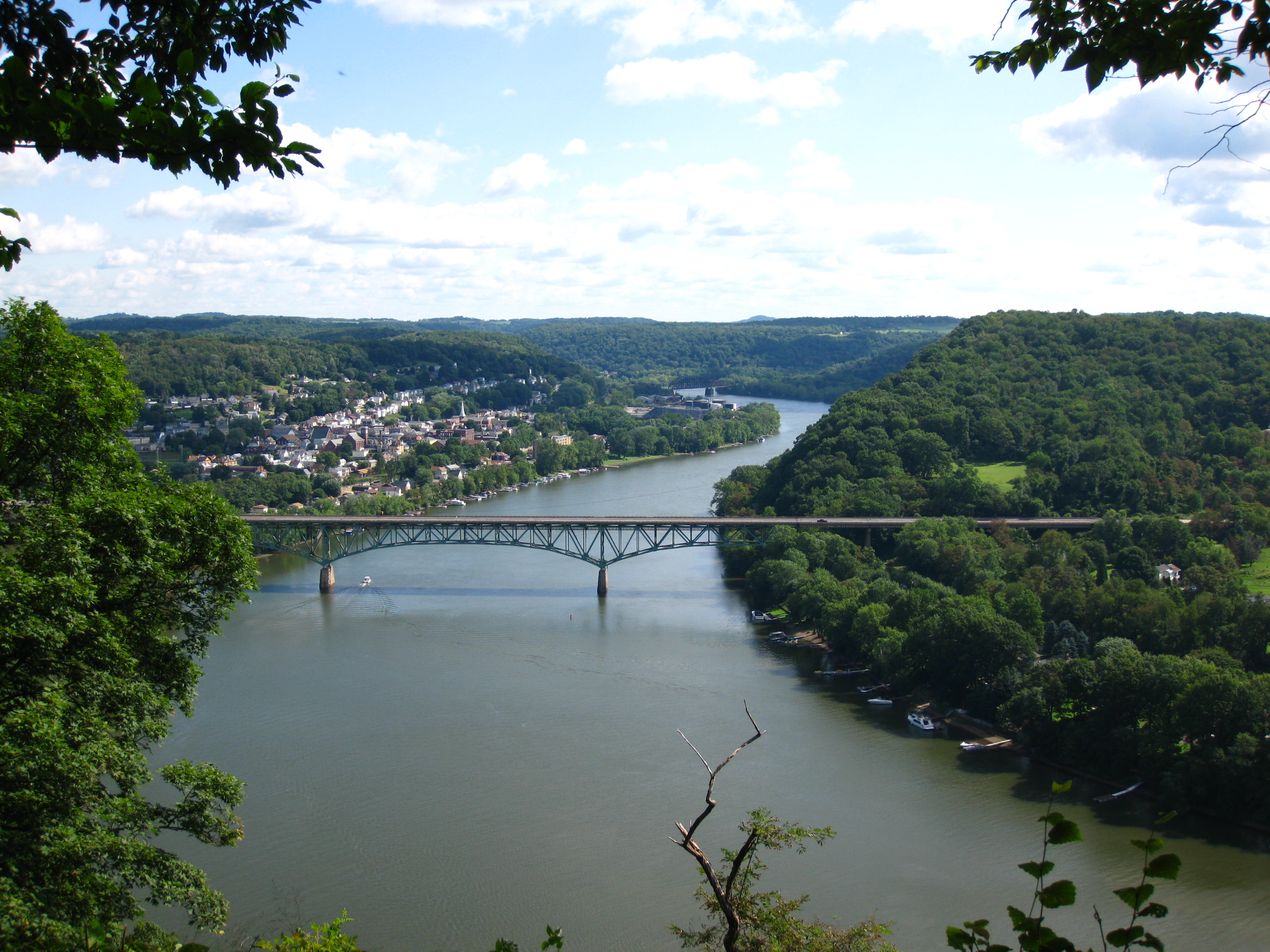
- View from Harrison Hills overlook.
- Coordinates: 40.6686°N 79.6921°W
- Carries: 4 lanes of PA 356
- Crosses: Allegheny River
- Locale: Buffalo Township and Allegheny Township
- Other name: Freeport Bridge
- Maintained by: PennDOT District 12-0

Characteristics
- Design: cantilever bridge
- Material: Steel
- Longest span: 426.0 feet (129.8 m)
- Piers in water: 2
- Clearance below: 47.0 feet (14.3 m)

History
- Opened: 1965

Location
- Interactive map of Donald R. Lobaugh Bridge

The Donald R. Lobaugh Bridge (commonly known as the Freeport Bridge) is a cantilever bridge that carries vehicular traffic across the Allegheny River between Buffalo and Allegheny townships in Pennsylvania.

== History ==
Built in 1965, the bridge marks the boundary between suburban Pittsburgh and the more rural Upper Allegheny. The structure replaced the 1889 Garvers Ferry Bridge, which was extremely deteriorated by the 1950s and that was nearly destroyed in a 1959 barge collision. The bridge's namesake is Donald R. Lobaugh, a Medal of Honor recipient from World War II.

The bridge was listed as having a poor deck and substructure and having serious deterioration of its superstructure before having $5 million of emergency steel repairs in 2006/2007. Before the repairs the weight limit was 3 tons; this was increased to a legal load limit of 40 tons after the repairs.

The bridge is maintained by Pennsylvania Department of Transport 12-0 and was rehabilitated over a period from 2010 to 2013.

== See also ==
- List of crossings of the Allegheny River
