= Anthony E. Gallo =

American playwright (born 1939)

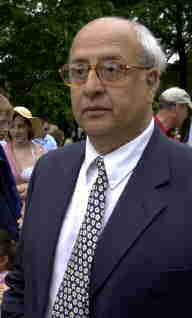
- Born: February 3, 1939 (age 87); Vandergrift, Pennsylvania, US
- Known for: Playwright, economist & film and stage producer
- Children: 1

Anthony Ernest (Tony) Gallo (born February 3, 1939) is an American playwright.

== Early life ==
Anthony Gallo received an undergraduate degree from the College of William and Mary and a master's degree from the Wharton School.

== Writing career ==
Gallo's plays have been staged in numerous venues, including, in Washington D.C.: The Kennedy Center, The National Press Club, Woolly Mammoth Theatre Company, Cosmos Theatre, and the Capital Fringe Festival; and in New York City: New York University, The Dramatists Guild of America, Casa Italiana, and Abingdon.

In 2016, Gallo's absurdist play Heathcliff in America premiered on Saturday, Oct. 22, at the Cosmos Club in Washington, D.C.

== Stage plays ==
- "Margherita" on the relationship between Benito Mussolini and Margherita Sarfatti, based on the Book of Judith.
- "Eugenio" on the conversion of Israel Zolli, Rome's Chief Rabbi, in 1944.
- "The Last Days of King Solomon" on doubt and faith during the rule of King Solomon.
- "The Agony of David” on the life of King David.
- "Vandergrift" on a businessman trying to reconcile capitalism with his Presbyterian religion to create a workers' paradise.
- "Lincoln and God" on Abraham Lincoln and God during the American Civil War
- "Charleston Revisited" set on Logan Street in Charleston, South Carolina.
- "The Botticelli Cruise" on a cruise along the east coast of Africa.
- "Paul" on the Apostle Paul.
- "Heathcliff in America" an absurdist play set in Rehoboth Beach, Delaware.
- "The Tragedy of King Saul" on King Saul
- "The Eaton Woman" on Peggy Eaton and the Petticoat Affair during the Andrew Jackson Administration
- Teresa on St. Teresa of Avila.
- *Better than the Best on nineteenth century capitalism
- "Luther" on the theologian Martin Luther.
- "Mr. Morris! Mr. Morris!" on the financier of the American Revolution, Robert Morris
- "Madame Caillaux" on the 1914 murder trial of Henriette Caillaux.
- "Robert" a surrealistic drama on Robert Todd Lincoln
- "Jonathan" on Jonathan, the son of King Saul.
- "Shakespeare and Lincoln" a surrealistic play on William Shakespeare and Abraham Lincoln .
- "Cabala" about Rome during the 1920s.
- "The Springfield Boys" on the relationship between Abraham Lincoln, Joshua Speed, and William Herndon

== Publications ==
- Margherita: ISBN 978-1-4563-8030-4; Eugenio: ISBN 978-1-4563-8670-2; The Last Days of King Solomon: ISBN 978-1-4609-8420-8; The Agony of David: ISBN 978-1-4609-1598-1. Available From Browns Court Publishing Company: February 2010: Seven Religious Dramas By Anthony E. Gallo, Edited By Lenny Levy; August 2009: Eight Dramas By Anthony E. Gallo, June 2008: Seven Dramas By Anthony E. Gallo, July 2006: Five Dramas By Anthony E. Gallo, November 2005: The Complete Plays Of Anthony E. Gallo. Single Plays: The Last Days Of King Solomon, November 2008; The Agony Of David: July 2007; Lincoln And God: August 2007; Margherita: July 2006; Eugenio: July 2006; Better Than The Best: July 2006; Vandergrift!: December 2006; Charleston Revisited: July 2006. British Publications: Margherita: New Theatre Publications, January 2009; Vandergrift!: New Theatre Publications, June 2009.

== Additional references ==
- Arguello, Julio, Voice of the Hill, Cap Hill Playwright. page 20 July 2008
- Colarco, Renee, Dramatist Diary, May–June 2010 selected Issues 2002-2011
- Jackson, Wanda, Prince Georges Sentinel, August 18, Vandergrift: Vandergrift! at The Greenbelt Arts, June 5, 2011
- McCall, Celeste, More Hill Theatrics, April 2009.
- Ryan Reilly, The Gazette, Playwright Debuts play about Life in Greenbelt. Thursday, August 5, 2010.
- Vandergrift News, "National Press Club Presents Vandergrift," Vandergrift, PA, September 1, 2007
- Wells, Carolyn, Review, Vandergrift, Community News. September 2007
- Washington Post, Selected issues 2007–present
