= Baker Trail =

Hiking trail in Pennsylvania, United States

Coordinates: 41.333°N 79.209°W

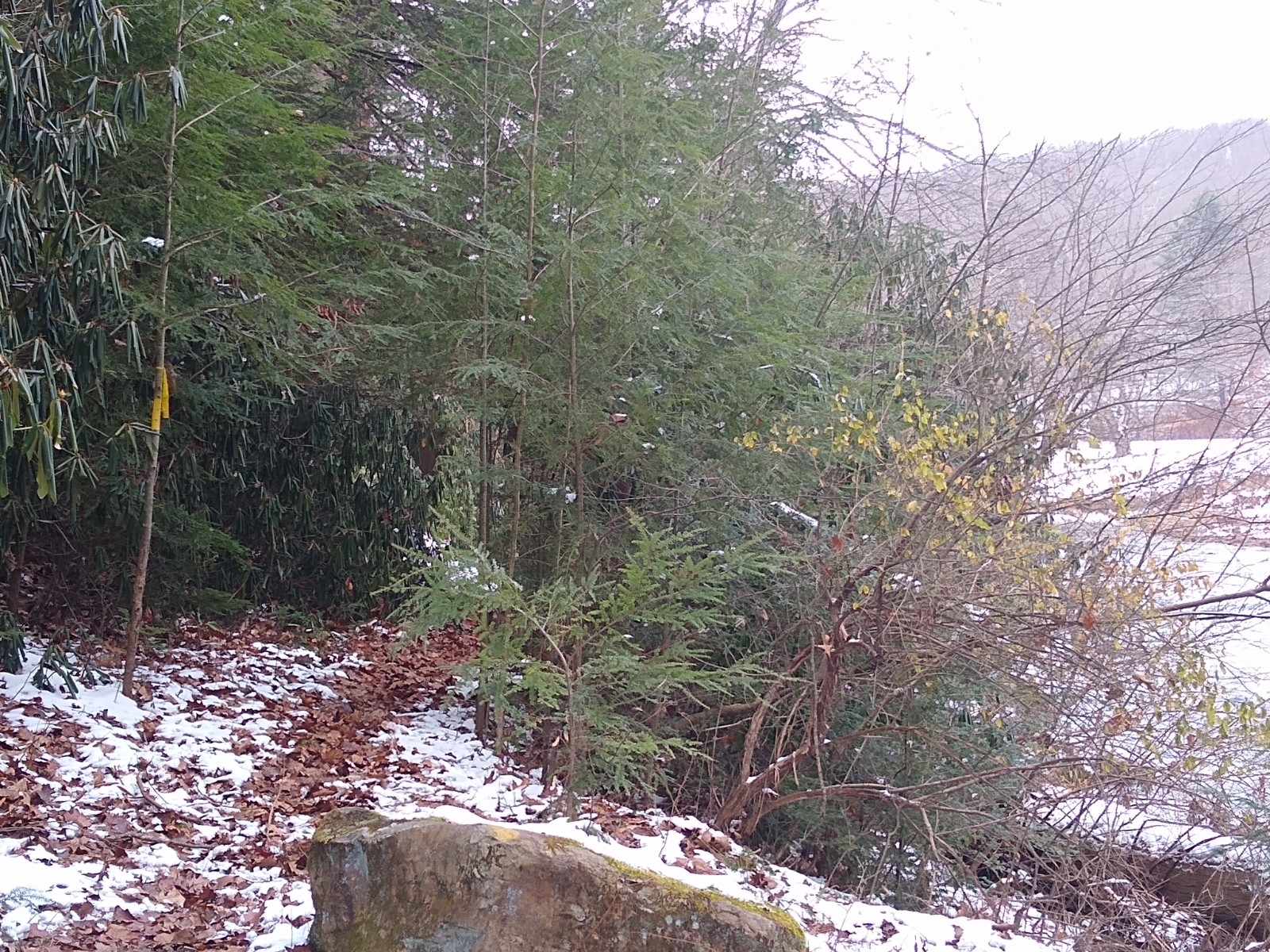
- The Baker Trail alongside Redbank Creek in Jefferson County
- Length: 134 mi (216 km)
- Location: Allegheny County, Armstrong County, Indiana County, Jefferson County, Clarion County, and Forest County, Pennsylvania, US
- Established: 1950
- Trailheads: South: near Freeport, Armstorng County; North: State Game Lands No. 24
- Use: Hiking
- Elevation change: Moderate
- Difficulty: Moderate
- Season: Year-round
- Hazards: Uneven and rocky terrain, rattlesnakes, mosquitoes, ticks, black bears

The Baker Trail is a 134-mile (216 km) hiking trail in western Pennsylvania in the United States. The trail's southern terminus is across the Allegheny River from the borough of Freeport in Armstrong County. Its northern terminus is in State Game Lands No. 24, in Forest County near a border with Allegheny National Forest. The Baker Trail is maintained by the Rachel Carson Trails Conservancy.

== History ==
The Baker Trail was first christened in 1950. It was named after Pittsburgh attorney and philanthropist Horace Forbes Baker. The trail originally reached about 133 miles from Aspinwall in the Pittsburgh metropolitan area to Cook Forest State Park. In the following years, development around Aspinwall caused several miles at the southern end of the trail to be abandoned, and the south terminus was retracted to Freeport. Meanwhile, the northern end was extended from Cook Forest State Park to Forest County, lengthening the trail to 141 miles. After some recent relocations, the trail's total length is now 134 miles.

Much of the route of the Baker Trail follows unpaved rural roads and rights-of-way for power lines or pipelines. It also crosses many tracts of private land, at which passage for hikers has been arranged with owners, though the trail also features ten overnight backpacking shelters. The trail is frequently rerouted due to changing landowners who disagree with previous arrangements allowing hikers. This situation may also lead to temporary or permanent closure of some of the shelters.

== Route ==
Hiking from south to north, the Baker Trail initially travels eastbound through suburban and semi-rural areas of Armstrong County. At about two miles from Freeport, the trail formerly used a railroad bridge over the Kiskiminetas River, but this has since been forbidden by the authorities, thus severing this segment of the trail. To the east, the Baker Trail walks along Crooked Creek Lake near Kittanning, and it also encounters Mahoning Creek Lake in northern Armstrong County. Continuing northbound into Clarion County and Jefferson County, at the town of Corsica, the Baker Trail follows PA Route 949 for about one mile and uses that road to cross Interstate 80. Later, the trail crosses the Clarion River via a rural road bridge at the village of Gravel Lick, continues within sight of the river for about one mile, and then enters the territory of Cook Forest State Park. After traversing extensive forested areas within the boundaries of the state park, the Baker Trail continues northbound through thinly-developed rural areas, into State Game Lands No. 24 in Forest County. The Baker Trail ends at State Route 2007, near Ellsworth Run and just south of a border with Allegheny National Forest.

At its northern end, about 15 miles of the Baker Trail have since been incorporated into the North Country National Scenic Trail, which currently joins the Baker Trail at Cook Forest State Park and continues into Allegheny National Forest beyond the Baker Trail's traditional northern terminus.
