= Freeport Area School District =

School district in Pennsylvania, US

Address
- 621 South Pike Rd Sarver, Pennsylvania 16055-9202; United States

District information
- Type: Public School District
- Established: 1969

Students and staff
- District mascot: Yellowjacket
- Colors: Blue & gold

Other information
- Website: www.freeport.k12.pa.us

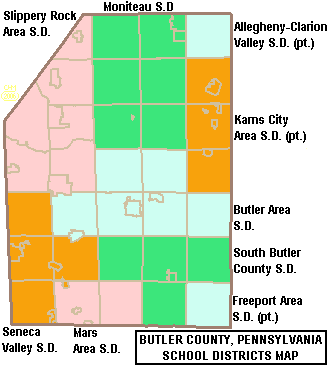
Freeport Area School District region in Butler County

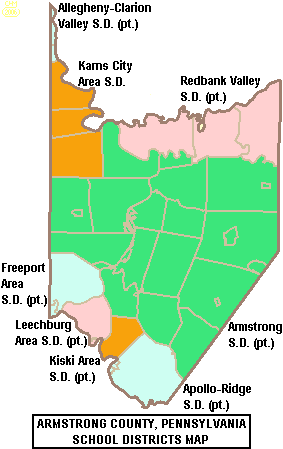
Freeport Area School District region in Armstrong County

Freeport Area School District (FASD) is a school in Pennsylvania, United States, headquartered in Sarver, Pennsylvania.

FASD lies along the banks of the Allegheny River and is on the mouth of Buffalo Creek. It is located about 25–30 miles north of Pittsburgh, Pennsylvania. The community is a mix of Pittsburgh suburbia and rural areas.

The district's mascot is the Yellowjackets.

== History ==
In 1969, the political divisions of Freeport, Buffalo and South Buffalo merged to form the Freeport Area School District.

The Junior High was built in 1923 and is no longer used as of the 2015–2016 school year, when the district added the new Freeport Area Middle School in Sarver. The old middle school gym had a cement floor and couldn't be used for sporting events. In the 1960s, the cafe was added to the school. Before then the students would travel out in Freeport and eat at several restaurants.

The junior high school used to be the high school. In 1960, a new high school was built in Sarver. Some high school events, such as football games, were still at the junior high. As of 2008, scoreboards were installed at the senior high fields, and the high school sports have been moved to the senior high. The varsity football team played at the junior high until the 2016–2017 school year, when a new athletic complex was built adjacent to the high school and middle school campuses in Sarver.

Unlike much of the rest of the industrial Allegheny River valley, this area has been experiencing modest population growth in recent years. This influenced the district to have reorganized their schools during the 2015–2016 school year, and eliminated two school buildings (the former Freeport Jr High School and the now demolished Freeport Kindergarten Center) and to have opened the new larger Freeport Area Middle School. Buffalo Elementary and South Buffalo Elementary house kindergarten through fifth grade, Freeport Area Middle School has grades 6 through 8, and the High School has grades 9 through 12.

== Attendance area ==
The district includes Freeport Borough and South Buffalo Township in Armstrong County, and Buffalo Township, Butler County.

== Extracurriculars ==
The district offers a variety of clubs, activities and sports.

== BeeTV ==
BeeTV is a small scale cable broadcast station located in Sarver, Pennsylvania. The station is linked to Freeport Area School District and provides information for events in the school district and the surrounding community. Content airing on BeeTV is student-produced and scheduled daily. Programs air hourly from 4 pm until 10 pm on weekdays, and from 10am until 10pm on weekends. Freeport Area Senior High School's morning announcements program, "You're Watching BeeTV" airs every weekday at 7:55 am, 11:15 am, and 7:30 pm est. BeeTV is broadcast on Armstrong Cable channels 50 & 205.

== Schools ==
Its schools are: Buffalo Elementary School, South Buffalo Elementary School, Freeport Area Middle School, and Freeport Area High School.

Buffalo Elementary School, the Freeport Area Middle School, and the Freeport Area High School, along with the Administration building, are in Sarver, an unincorporated area in Buffalo Township, Butler County. South Buffalo Elementary School is located in South Buffalo Township in Armstrong County, near, but not in, Freeport.
