= Washington Township, Westmoreland County, Pennsylvania =

Township in Pennsylvania, US

Washington Township
- Township
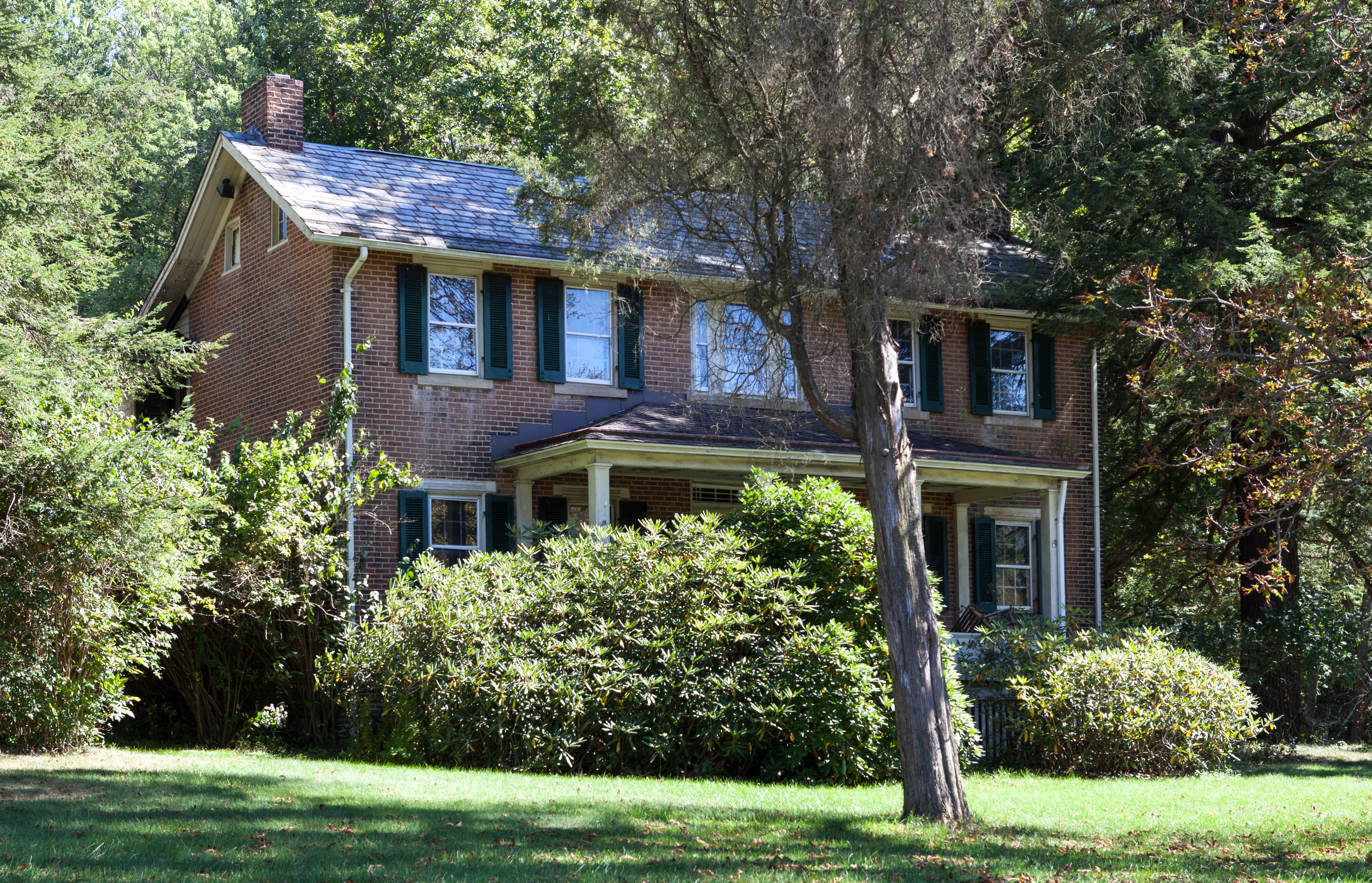
- John Walter Farmhouse, a historic site in the township

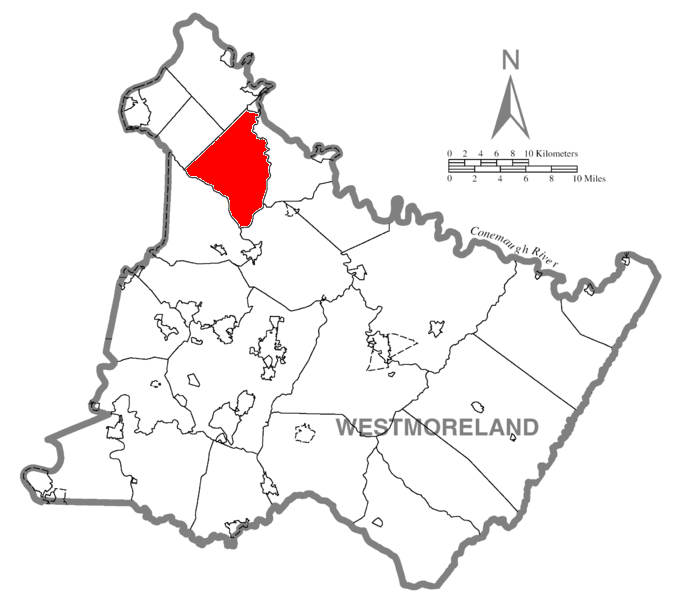
- Location within Westmoreland County

- Location within Pennsylvania
- Coordinates: 40°18′16″N 79°32′40″W
- Country: United States
- State: Pennsylvania
- County: Westmoreland
- Incorporated: 1789

Area
  - Total: 32.81 sq mi (84.97 km^{2})
  - Land: 31.95 sq mi (82.76 km^{2})
  - Water: 0.85 sq mi (2.21 km^{2})

Population (2020)
  - Total: 6,887 ▼
  - Estimate (2021): 6,845
  - Density: 225.5/sq mi (87.06/km^{2})
- Time zone: UTC-5 (Eastern (EST))
  - Summer (DST): UTC-4 (EDT)
- Zip code: 15613
- Area code: 724
- FIPS code: 42-129-81336
- Website: Official website

Washington Township is a township in Westmoreland County, Pennsylvania, United States. It was founded in 1789 from Salem Township. At that time, it included the present-day municipalities of Allegheny, Lower Burrell, Upper Burrell, and most of Bell. In 2020, the population of Washington Twp was 6,887.

== History ==
The John Walter Farmstead was listed on the National Register of Historic Places in 1995.

== Geography ==
According to the United States Census Bureau, the township has a total area of 32.6 square miles (84.4 km^{2}), of which 31.7 square miles (82.1 km^{2}) is land and 0.9 square mile (2.3 km^{2}) (2.67%) is water.

== Demographics ==
Historical population
| Census | Pop. | Note | %± |
|---|---|---|---|
| 2000 | 7,384 | | — |
| 2010 | 7,422 | | 0.5% |
| 2020 | 6,887 | | −7.2% |
| 2021 (est.) | 6,845 | | −0.6% |
U.S. Decennial Census

As of the census of 2000, there were 7,384 people, 2,809 households, and 2,151 families living in the township. The population density was 232.9 inhabitants per square mile (89.9/km^{2}). There were 2,961 housing units at an average density of 93.4 per square mile (36.1/km^{2}). The racial makeup of the township was 99.00% White, 0.60% African American, 0.03% Native American, 0.09% Asian, 0.09% from other races, and 0.19% from two or more races. Hispanic or Latino of any race were 0.24% of the population.

There were 2,809 households, out of which 30.4% had children under the age of 18 living with them, 67.2% were married couples living together, 6.0% had a female householder with no husband present, and 23.4% were non-families. 20.5% of all households were made up of individuals, and 9.1% had someone living alone who was 65 years of age or older. The average household size was 2.56 and the average family size was 2.96.

The population distribution by age was as follows: 22.3% under the age of 18, 5.9% from 18 to 24, 26.6% from 25 to 44, 28.2% from 45 to 64, and 17.1% aged 65 years or older. The median age was 42 years. For every 100 females there were 97.9 males. For every 100 females age 18 and over, there were 95.1 males.

The median income for a household in the township was $40,908, and the median income for a family was $48,508. Males had a median income of $39,265 versus $26,900 for females. The per capita income for the township was $19,804. About 5.0% of families and 7.5% of the population were below the poverty line, including 11.0% of those under age 18 and 7.9% of those age 65 or over.

== Industry ==
Natural gas is extracted from shale formations in the area through hydraulic fracturing (commonly known as "fracking"). As of January 2022, about 40 Marcellus Shale gas wells were located in the township.

A shale gas well blowout occurred in the township in 2019. CNX Natural Gas Co LLC was fined $175,000 for environmental violations associated with the incident.

Coal mining was once a significant industry in the area. Deep mining was done underneath most of Washington Township, and strip mining took place near Beaver Run. The Roaring Run underground coal mine, constructed around 1905 by F. M. Graff, spanned Washington and Bell townships. Built to work the Freeport coal seam, by 1940 it employed approximately 300 miners, producing 1,500 tons of coal a day.

== Education ==
Kiski Area School District
