= List of crossings of the Kiskiminetas River =

This is a complete list of bridges and dams that span the Kiskiminetas River from its confluence at the Conemaugh River and Loyalhanna Creek to its mouth at the Allegheny River.

== Crossings ==
Crossing	Carries	Location
Kiski Junction Bridge	Kiski Junction Railroad	Allegheny Township and Gilpin Township
Mill Bridge		West Leechburg and Leechburg
Leechburg Bridge		West Leechburg and Leechburg
Hyde Park Footbridge		Hyde Park and Leechburg
Vandergrift Bridge	PA 56	Vandergrift and Parks Township
Apollo Bridge	PA 66	Oklahoma and Apollo
Rail Bridge (abandoned)	former Pennsylvania Railroad Apollo Branch	Bell Township and Kiskiminetas Township
Salina Bridge		Bell Township and Kiskiminetas Township
Rail Bridge	Conemaugh Line	Avonmore and Kiskiminetas Township
Avonmore Bridge	PA 156	Avonmore and Kiskiminetas Township
Saltsburg Bridge	PA 286	Loyalhanna Township and Saltsburg
Headwaters of the Kiskiminetas River		Loyalhanna Township and Saltsburg
