= Kiskimere, Pennsylvania =

Unincorporated community in Pennsylvania, US

- Census-designated place
- Location within Pennsylvania Location within the United States
- Coordinates: 40°37′11″N 79°35′01″W
- Country: United States
- State: Pennsylvania
- County: Armstrong
- Township: Parks

Area
  - Total: 0.36 sq mi (0.92 km^{2})
  - Land: 0.31 sq mi (0.79 km^{2})
  - Water: 0.046 sq mi (0.12 km^{2})

Population (2020)
  - Total: 135
  - Density: 440.3/sq mi (170.02/km^{2})
- Time zone: UTC-5 (Eastern (EST))
  - Summer (DST): UTC-4 (EDT)
- FIPS code: 42-39960

Kiskimere is a census-designated place located in Parks Township, Armstrong County, in the U.S. state of Pennsylvania. As of the 2020 census the population was 135. The community is located on the east bank of the Kiskiminetas River and is bordered by the community of Pleasant View to the south. To the west, across the river, is Allegheny Township in Westmoreland County.

Pennsylvania Route 66 (River Road) passes through Kiskimere, leading 3 miles (5 km) northwest (downstream) to Leechburg and 2.5 miles (4.0 km) southeast (upstream) to North Vandergrift.

== Demographics ==
Historical population
Census	Pop.	Note	%±
2020	135		—
U.S. Decennial Census
