= Leechburg Bridge =

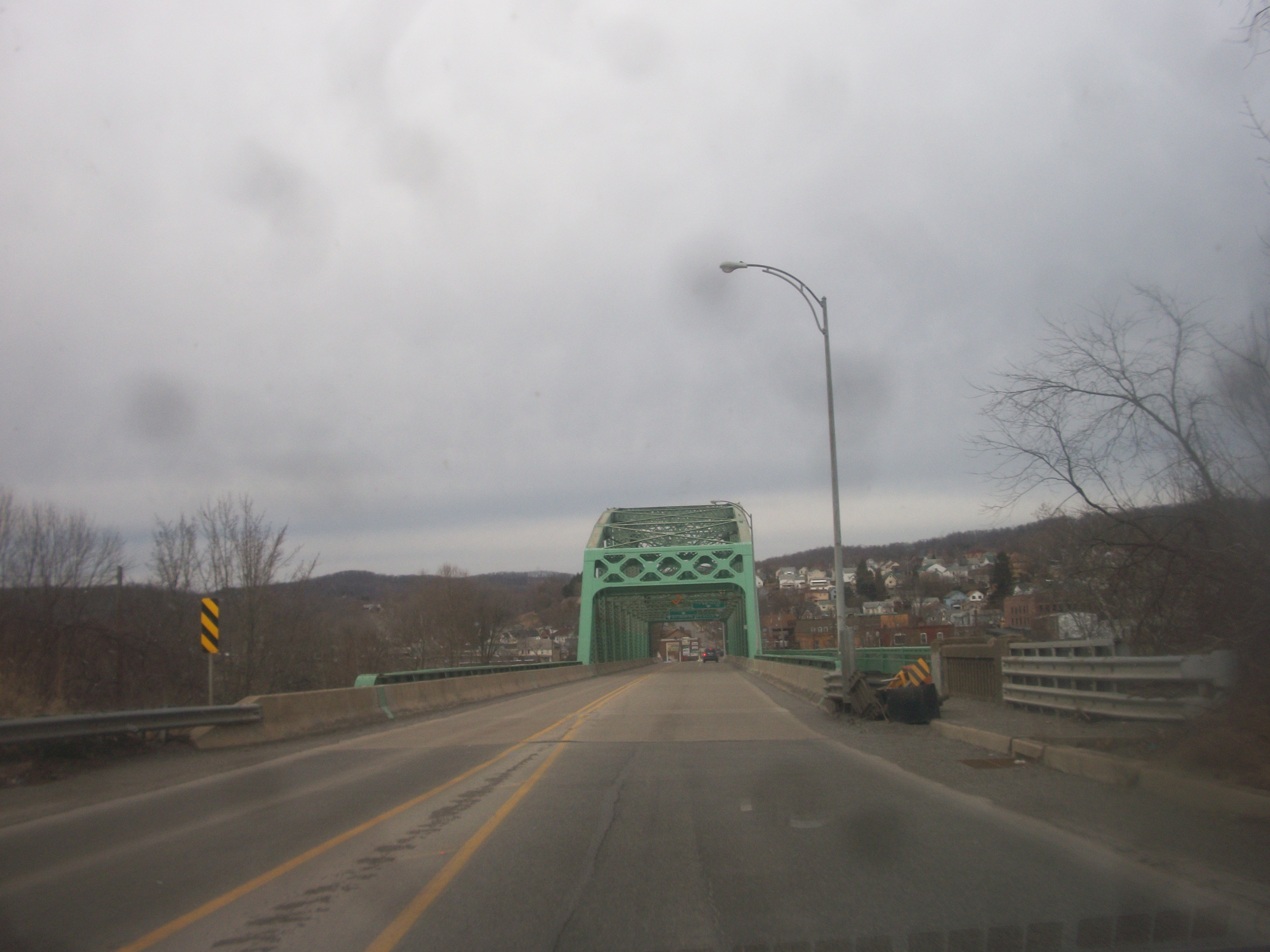
- Coordinates: 40°37′33″N 79°36′31″W
- Carries: 2 lanes of Third Street
- Crosses: Kiskiminetas River
- Locale: West Leechburg and Leechburg, Pennsylvania

Characteristics
- Design: truss bridge
- Total length: 669 ft
- Width: 43ft

History
- Opened: 1935

The Leechburg Bridge is a bridge that crosses the Kiskiminetas River between West Leechburg and Leechburg in Pennsylvania U.S.A. It carries unsigned state route 4093 and connects with Pennsylvania Route 66 just after the Leechburg approach.

This five-span 1935 truss bridge replaced an older structure on the site. It features unusually wide shoulders, due to the presence of turning lanes immediately at the ends of the bridge. In 1984, the bridge was rehabilitated.

== See also ==
- List of crossings of the Kiskiminetas River
