= Kiskiminetas =

Kiskiminetas may refer to the following places in Pennsylvania:

- Kiskiminetas River, a tributary of the Allegheny River
- Kiskiminetas Junction, Pennsylvania, Westmoreland County
- Kiskiminetas Township, Armstrong County, Pennsylvania
