= Mill Bridge (Pennsylvania) =

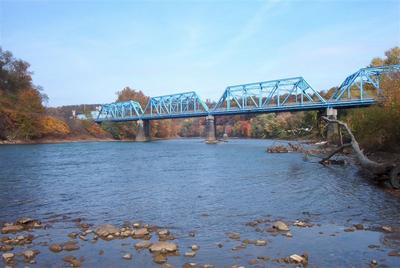
- Coordinates: 40°38′N 79°37′W
- Carries: 2 lanes of Mill Bridge Road
- Crosses: Kiskiminetas River
- Locale: West Leechburg and Leechburg, Pennsylvania

Characteristics
- Design: truss bridge
- Total length: 704 ft
- Width: 26 ft

History
- Opened: 1938

The Mill Bridge is a structure that crosses the Kiskiminetas River between West Leechburg and Leechburg in the U.S. state of Pennsylvania.

A 1938 truss bridge, the structure carries the eponymous Mill Bridge Road between the two boroughs. However, it is not the main access route in the area; rather it was designed for industrial purposes, as it connects central Leechburg with the Allegheny Technologies Ludlum Plant, which has long been a fixture in the area. In 1992, the bridge was rehabilitated.

== See also ==
- List of crossings of the Kiskiminetas River
