= Conemaugh Township, Pennsylvania =

Conemaugh Township is the name of some places in the U.S. state of Pennsylvania:

- Conemaugh Township, Cambria County, Pennsylvania
- Conemaugh Township, Indiana County, Pennsylvania
- Conemaugh Township, Somerset County, Pennsylvania
