= Cignetti =

Cignetti is an Italian surname. Notable people with the surname include:

- Curt Cignetti (born 1961), American football player and coach
- Frank Cignetti (disambiguation), multiple people
