= Millbridge =

Millbridge or Mill Bridge may refer to:

- Millbridge, Western Australia, Australia
- Millbridge, Ontario, Canada
- Millbridge, Plymouth, England, United Kingdom
- Mill Bridge, North Carolina, United States
- Mill Bridge (Pennsylvania), a bridge across the Kiskiminetas River

== See also ==
- Milbridge, Maine, United States
