= Parks Township =

Parks Township may refer to:

- Parks Township, Scott County, Arkansas, in Scott County, Arkansas
- Parks Township, Pennsylvania
