= Minarcin =

Minarcin is a surname. Notable people with the surname include:

- Pat Minarcin, American news anchor on WTSP (1994–1998)
- Rudy Minarcin (1930–2013), American baseball player
