= Frank Cignetti =

Frank Cignetti may refer to:

- Frank Cignetti Sr. (1937–2022), American football player and coach, head coach at West Virginia University (1976–1979) and Indiana University of Pennsylvania (1986–2005)
- Frank Cignetti Jr. (born 1965), American football player and coach, current quarterbacks coach for the New York Giants, son of the former
