= North Vandergrift-Pleasant View, Pennsylvania =

North Vandergrift
- Former CDP
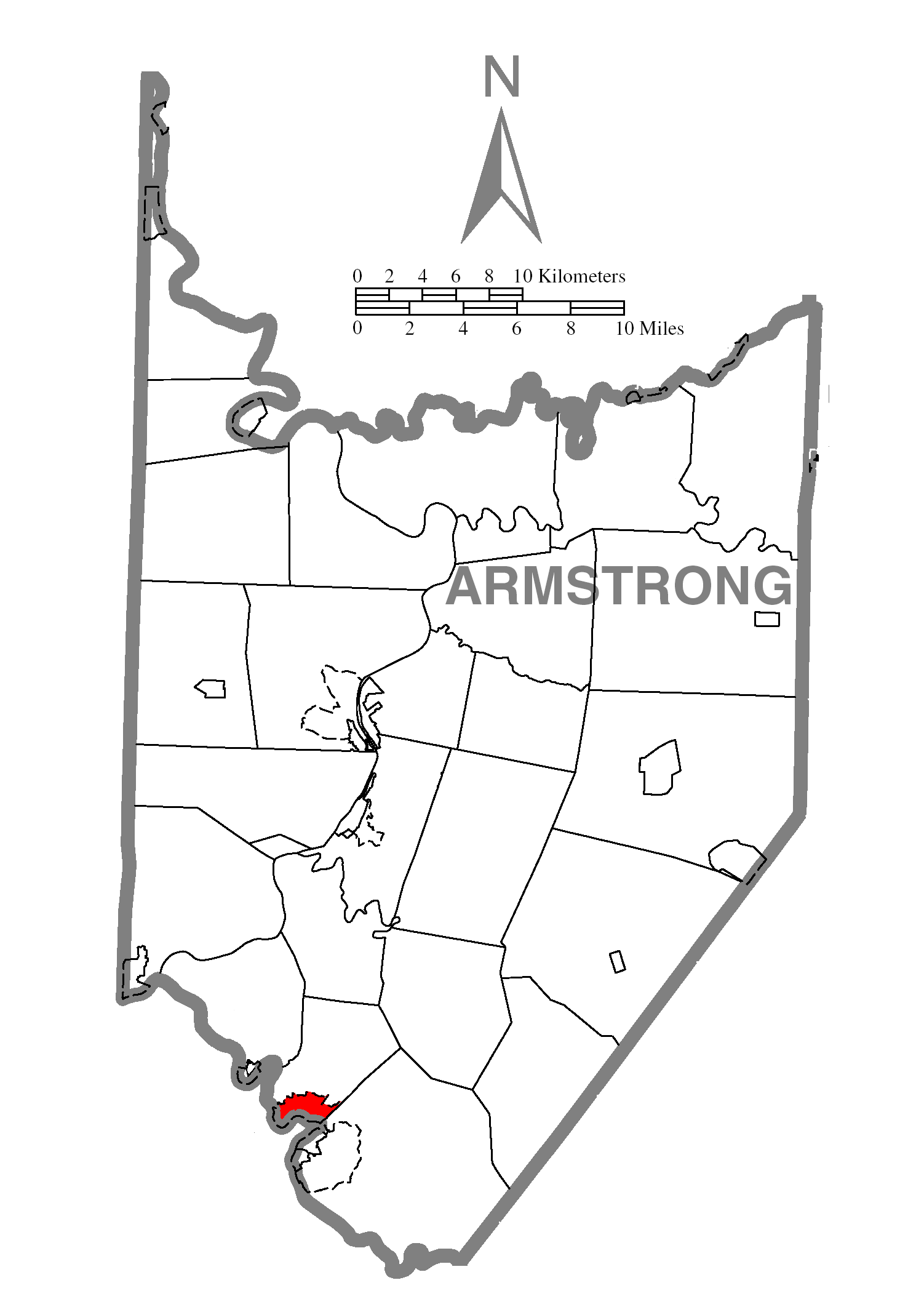
- Location within Armstrong County

- Location within the U.S. state of Pennsylvania North Vandergrift (the United States)
- Coordinates: 40°36′31″N 79°34′0″W
- Country: United States
- State: Pennsylvania
- County: Armstrong

Area
  - Total: 1.9 sq mi (4.9 km^{2})
  - Land: 1.8 sq mi (4.7 km^{2})
  - Water: 0.1 sq mi (0.26 km^{2})

Population (2000)
  - Total: 1,355
  - Density: 750/sq mi (290/km^{2})
- Time zone: UTC-5 (Eastern (EST))
  - Summer (DST): UTC-4 (EDT)

North Vandergrift-Pleasant View was a census-designated place (CDP) in Armstrong County, Pennsylvania, United States. The population was 1,355 at the 2000 census. For the 2010 census, the area was split into two CDPs, North Vandergrift and Pleasant View.

== Geography ==
North Vandergrift-Pleasant View was located at 40°36′31″N 79°34′0″W (40.608688, −79.566570).

According to the United States Census Bureau, the CDP had a total area of 1.9 square miles (4.9 km^{2}), of which 1.8 square miles (4.7 km^{2}) was land and 0.1 square miles (0.26 km^{2}), or 3.19%, is water.

== Demographics ==
As of the 2000 census, there were 1,355 people, 555 households, and 386 families residing in the CDP. The population density was 746.7 inhabitants per square mile (288.3/km^{2}). There were 604 housing units at an average density of 332.8 per square mile (128.5/km^{2}). The racial makeup of the CDP was 93.87% White, 3.32% African American, 1.77% from other races, and 1.03% from two or more races. Hispanic or Latino of any race were 1.18% of the population.

There were 555 households, out of which 28.8% had children under the age of 18 living with them, 54.1% were married couples living together, 10.3% had a female householder with no husband present, and 30.3% were non-families. 25.6% of all households were made up of individuals, and 13.2% had someone living alone who was 65 years of age or older. The average household size was 2.41 and the average family size was 2.89.

In the CDP, the population was spread out, with 21.7% under the age of 18, 6.1% from 18 to 24, 28.1% from 25 to 44, 23.8% from 45 to 64, and 20.4% who were 65 years of age or older. The median age was 41 years. For every 100 females, there were 95.8 males. For every 100 females age 18 and over, there were 97.2 males.

The median income for a household in the CDP was $25,125, and the median income for a family was $34,250. Males had a median income of $27,500 versus $19,500 for females. The per capita income for the CDP was $13,987. About 10.8% of families and 14.8% of the population were below the poverty line, including 21.1% of those under age 18 and 3.6% of those age 65 or over.

== Notable person ==
- Rudy Minarcin, baseball player.
