= Orchard Hills, Pennsylvania =

Unincorporated community in Pennsylvania, US

- Census-designated place
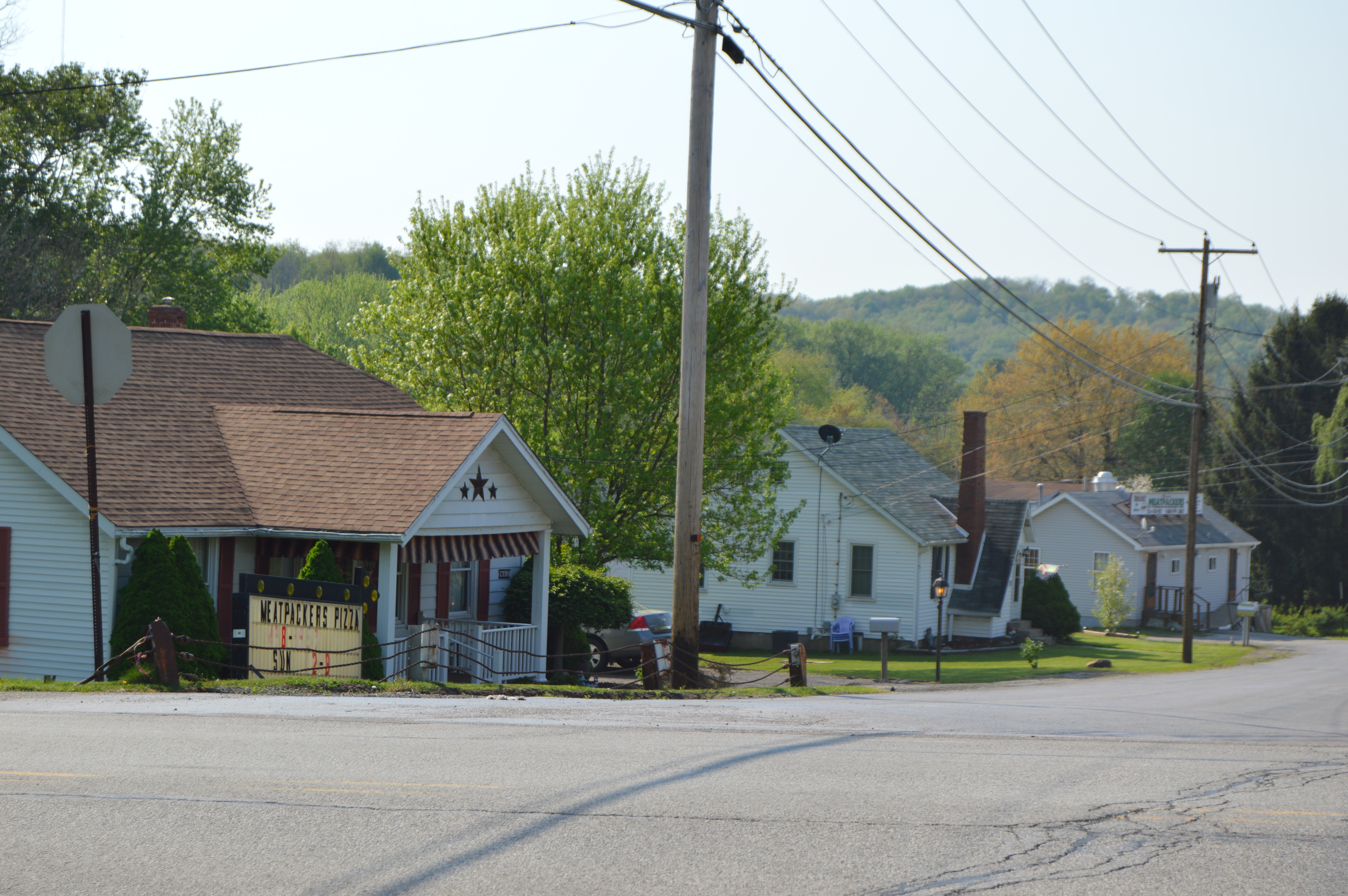
- Florida Avenue at Pennsylvania Route 56

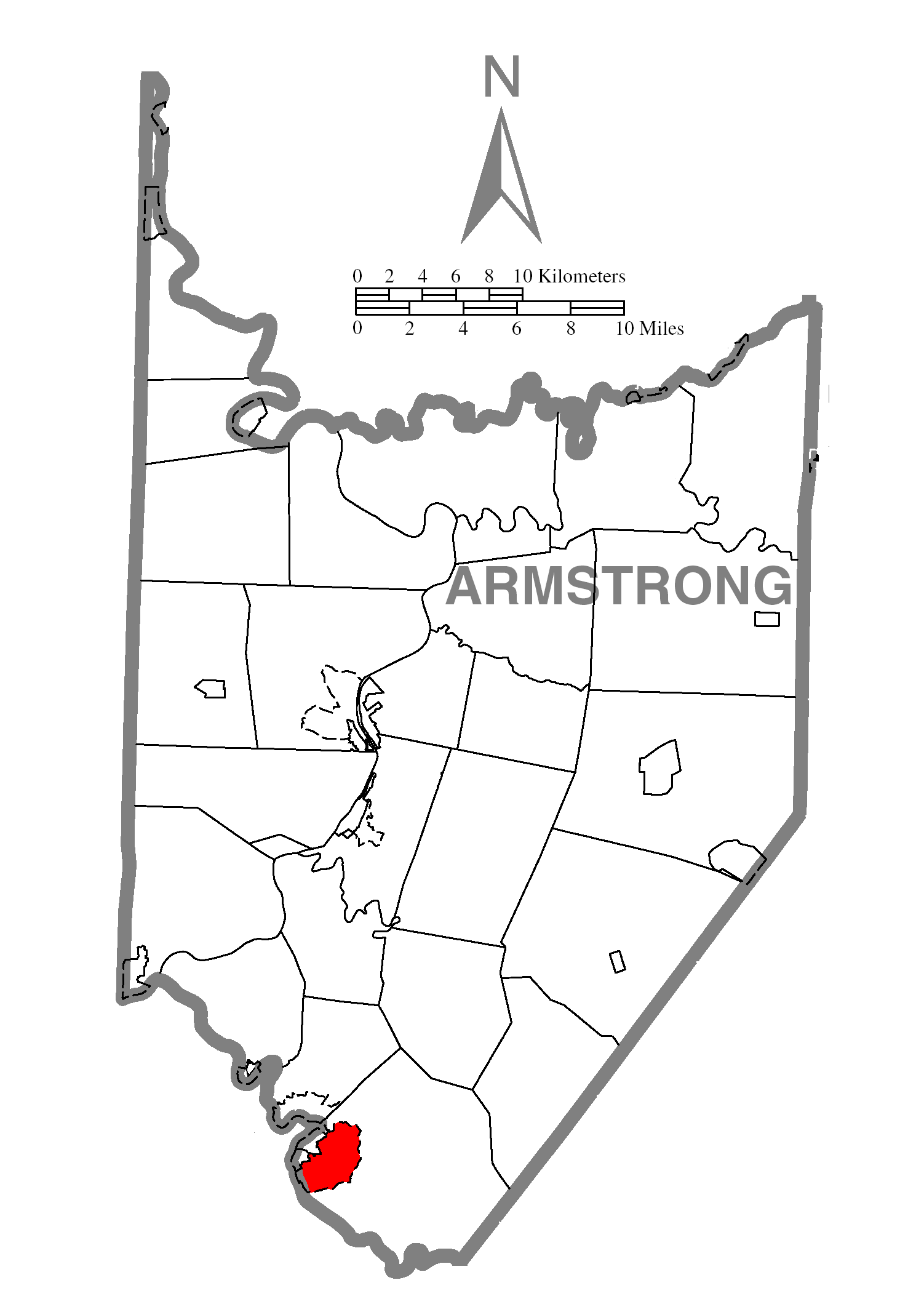
- Location within Armstrong County

- Location within the U.S. state of Pennsylvania Orchard Hills (the United States)
- Coordinates: 40°35′7″N 79°32′47″W
- Country: United States
- State: Pennsylvania
- County: Armstrong
- Township: Kiskiminetas

Area
  - Total: 3.97 sq mi (10.29 km^{2})
  - Land: 3.95 sq mi (10.22 km^{2})
  - Water: 0.027 sq mi (0.07 km^{2})

Population (2020)
  - Total: 1,949
  - Density: 493.9/sq mi (190.68/km^{2})
- Time zone: UTC-5 (Eastern (EST))
  - Summer (DST): UTC-4 (EDT)
- FIPS code: 42-56960

Orchard Hills is a census-designated place (CDP) in Armstrong County, Pennsylvania, United States. The population was 1,949 at the 2020 census.

== Geography ==
Orchard Hills is located at 40°35′7″N 79°32′47″W (40.585377, −79.546323).

According to the United States Census Bureau, the CDP has a total area of 3.9 square miles (10 km^{2}), of which 3.9 square miles (10 km^{2}) is land and 0.04 square miles (0.10 km^{2}) (0.51%) is water.

== Demographics ==
Historical population
Census	Pop.	Note	%±
2010	1,952		—
2020	1,949		−0.2%
U.S. Decennial Census

At the 2000 census, there were 2,152 people, 837 households, and 621 families living in the CDP. The population density was 549.0 inhabitants per square mile (212.0/km^{2}). There were 901 housing units at an average density of 229.9 per square mile (88.8/km^{2}). The racial makeup of the CDP was 98.19% White, 0.51% African American, 0.46% Asian, 0.23% from other races, and 0.60% from two or more races. Hispanic or Latino of any race were 0.70%.

There were 837 households, 31.1% had children under the age of 18 living with them, 59.1% were married couples living together, 10.5% had a female householder with no husband present, and 25.8% were non-families. 21.4% of households were made up of individuals, and 10.5% were one person aged 65 or older. The average household size was 2.55 and the average family size was 2.95.

The age distribution was 23.4% under the age of 18, 6.6% from 18 to 24, 28.8% from 25 to 44, 23.3% from 45 to 64, and 17.9% 65 or older. The median age was 40 years. For every 100 females there were 95.3 males. For every 100 females age 18 and over, there were 94.6 males.

The median household income was $30,403 and the median family income was $36,000. Males had a median income of $31,406 versus $21,553 for females. The per capita income for the CDP was $15,105. About 16.0% of families and 17.9% of the population were below the poverty line, including 29.8% of those under age 18 and 8.0% of those age 65 or over.
