= Cal Hawk =

American baseball player (1847–1899)

- Pitcher
- Born: October 20, 1847; Leechburg, Pennsylvania, US
- Died: December 16, 1899 (aged 52); Freeport, Pennsylvania, US

Teams

Career highlights and awards
- First baseball pitcher to receive a stated salary

William Clarence "Cal" Hawk (October 20, 1847 – December 16, 1899) was an American professional baseball player in the 1870s.

== Career ==
He played as a pitcher for the Oil City Senecas, the New Castle Neshannocks and the Bradford team. In 1873, he became the first pitcher to receive a stated salary, being paid $62 per month. He has been called "the first real professional hurler the game ever had." In 1899, the Sporting Life reported that he was "one of the first twirlers to pitch a curve ball, which in his time was considered a wonderful feat."

=== Retirement ===
Hawk retired from professional baseball in 1877, though he continued to participate in games at Freeport, Pennsylvania.

== Later life and death ==
Hawk was employed by Guckenheimer & Bros. distillery in Freeeport after retiring from baseball. While at work, he fell on his head onto a cement floor from a height of approximately 12 feet. The concussion from the fall led to traumatic meningitis, and Hawk died at his Freeport home, in December 1899 at age 52.
