= Carnahan Run =

Location
- Country: United States

Physical characteristics
- Source
  - coordinates: 40.6306207°N 79.4761539°W
- Mouth
  - coordinates: 40.6122878°N 79.5839339°W
  - elevation: 768 ft (234 m)

Basin features
- River system: Allegheny River

Carnahan Run is a tributary of the Kiskiminetas River in Armstrong County in the U.S. state of Pennsylvania.

== Course ==
Carnahan Run joins the Kiskiminetas River in Parks Township.

== Cleanup ==
The stream received cleanup as part of the River Sweep of the Ohio River watershed in 2010.

== See also ==
- List of rivers of Pennsylvania
- List of tributaries of the Allegheny River
