= Leechburg Area School District =

School district in Pennsylvania

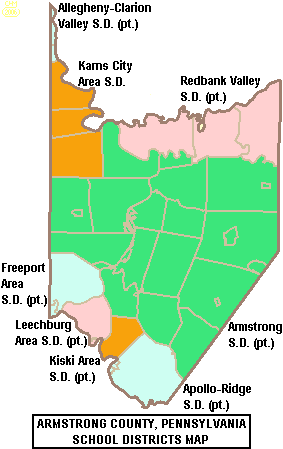

Address
- 210 Penn Avenue Leechburg, Pennsylvania, 15656; United States

District information
- Type: Public
- Schools: David Leech Elementary; Leechburg Area Middle School and Leechburg Area High School

Students and staff
- District mascot: Blue Devil

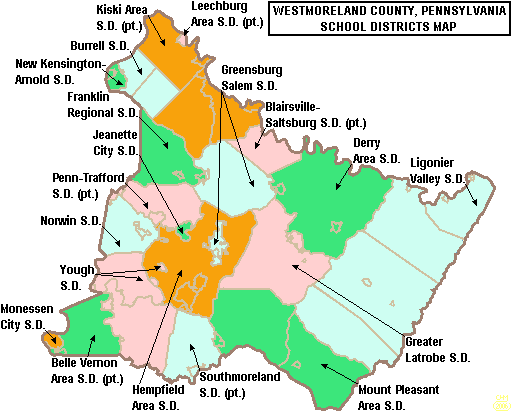
Leechburg Area School District region in Westmoreland County

The Leechburg Area School District is a public school district serving Pre-K through 12th grade students from Leechburg Borough, Gilpin Township and West Leechburg Borough in Westmoreland County in Pennsylvania. The district is one of the 500 public school districts of Pennsylvania. According to 2010 federal census data, it serves a resident population of 5,946. In 2009, the residents’ per capita income was $17,586, while the median family income was $42,950. In the Commonwealth, the median family income was $49,501 and the United States median family income was $49,445, in 2010. By 2013, the median household income in the United States rose to $52,100.

Leechburg Area School District operates just two schools: David Leech Elementary School and Leechburg Area Middle/High School.

The high school building was originally built in 1922, and the elementary building in 1955. Both school facilities underwent a major renovation in the mid-1990s. This work combined the separate elementary and high school buildings into one building. The Baker building was also connected by using a sky walk. Afterward, it was possible to reach any part of the 3 buildings without traveling outside, increasing security and keeping students from having to cross a public road to get into the Baker Building. The renovation also included new doors that were not able to be opened from the outside during school hours. The renovation of the facilities cost approximately $12 million.The district underwent another renovation in 2019 which included upgrades to the HVCAC system, more environmentally friendly lighting sources, and the installation of a turf field at the Veteran's Memorial Field and a makeover of the West Leechburg baseball field. A further renovation started in the summer of 2025 to finish the HVAC, boiler systems, and a few other minor projects.

== School Board Directors ==
- Dr. Ashley Coudriet, President
- Mr. Andrew Pallus, Vice President
- Ms. Candi Stewart
- Mr. Joseph Lepish
- Mrs. Melanie Knight
- Mr. Darius Lovelace
- Mr. Anthony Townsend
- Mr. Jimmy Feudale
- Mr. Tom Maxin

== Extracurriculars ==
The Leechburg Area School District offers a variety of clubs, activities and an extensive sports program.

=== Sports ===
In March 2007, the boys basketball team, The Blue Devils, won against the California Trojans in the WPIAL championship. The score was 60-59. This was the first WPIAL boys' basketball championship win for Leechburg in the history of the school district. The Blue Devils have also won three (3) WPIAL football championships (1953, 1965, and 1966), three WPIAL softball championships (1991, 1992, and 1995) and two PIAA softball championships (1992 and 1995).
