= Clarksburg, Pennsylvania =

Unincorporated community in Pennsylvania, US

Coordinates: 40°32′01″N 79°22′55″W

Clarksburg is an unincorporated community in Conemaugh Township, in Indiana County, Pennsylvania, United States.

It is located on Pennsylvania Route 286 between Indiana and Saltsburg.

In the town proper, Clarksburg contains a post office, greenhouse, a bar (closed c. 2016), a Sunoco station, small store, and fish hatchery, as well as the Clarksburg Presbyterian Church. The church youth hold multiple spaghetti dinners on Saturdays throughout the fall and spring. There are a number of family farms in the area, including agribusiness such as feed lots and "pick your own". The town also has its own T-ball and baseball league that gets organized at the Kenneth Quick Memorial Park. The park also plays host to the annual town festival that has a 5k, dunking booth and food stands.

Originating in the hills north and east of town, Blacklegs Creek meanders through on its way to Saltsburg to join the Kiskimenitas River, then the Conemaugh River and ultimately heading to Pittsburgh to flow into the Ohio River and beyond. The Shelocta branch of Norfolk Southern Railroad was built around 2005 and runs on the far side of Blacklegs creek for the length of town.
