= Frank Cignetti Sr. =

American football player and coach (1937–2022)

Biographical details
- Born: October 8, 1937; Apollo, Pennsylvania, U.S.
- Died: September 10, 2022 (aged 84); McCandless, Pennsylvania, U.S.

Playing career
- 1957–1959: Indiana (PA)
- Position: End

Coaching career (HC unless noted)
- 1960–1961: Leechburg HS (PA) (assistant)
- 1962–1965: Leechburg HS (PA)
- 1966–1968: Pittsburgh (assistant)
- 1969: Princeton (assistant)
- 1970–1975: West Virginia (assistant)
- 1976–1979: West Virginia
- 1986–2005: IUP

Head coaching record
- Overall: 199–77–1 (college); 32–9 (high school)
- Tournaments: 15–13 (NCAA D-II playoffs)

Accomplishments and honors

Championships
- 2 PSAC (1986–1987); 14 PSAC Western Division (1986–1988, 1990–1994, 1996, 2000–2004)
- College Football Hall of Fame; Inducted in 2013 (profile)

Frank Cignetti Sr. (October 8, 1937 – September 10, 2022) was an American football player and coach. He served as the head football coach at West Virginia University from 1976 to 1979 and at Indiana University of Pennsylvania (IUP) from 1986 to 2005, compiling a career college football record of 199–77–1. Cignetti led the IUP Indians (Note: IUP changed its team nickname from "Indians" to "Crimson Hawks" in 2006.) to the title game of the NCAA Division II Football Championship in 1990 and 1993, but lost them both. He was inducted into the College Football Hall of Fame as a coach in 2013.

== Early life and education ==
Cignetti was born on October 8, 1937. He attended Indiana(PA)State Teachers College/Indiana State College, where he lettered in football and basketball. As an end on the football team, Cignetti was a National Association of Intercollegiate Athletics All-American.

Cignetti graduated with a bachelor's degree in 1960. He earned a master's degree from IUP in 1965.

== Coaching career ==
Cignetti's first coaching position was as an assistant for Leechburg High School's football team. He became Leechburg's head coach and coached them to the Western Pennsylvania Interscholastic Athletic League Class 1A championship in 1965. From 1966 to 1968, he was an assistant with the Pittsburgh Panthers, where he coached their quarterbacks and wide receivers. He served as an offensive assistant for the Princeton Tigers in 1969 and joined Bobby Bowden's coaching staff for the West Virginia Mountaineers, coaching the offensive backfield.

Cignetti was promoted to head coach in January 1976 and led WVU for four seasons. Though the team had won the 1975 Peach Bowl, 32 of its players were seniors, and Cignetti had to rebuild the program. He had a 17–27 (.386) record as West Virginia's head coach. In 1979, Cignetti was diagnosed with lymphomatoid granulomatosis, a form of cancer. He had a splenectomy and spent 35 days in the hospital. Cignetti was fired in November 1979, several days after the conclusion of WVU's regular season, but recovered from cancer.

In 1982, Cignetti became the director of athletics at IUP. He became the head coach of IUP's football team in 1986. He coached IUP to a 182–50–1 (.783) record from 1986 to 2005. Under Cignetti, IUP won the Pennsylvania State Athletic Conference West Division 14 times and did not have a losing season. IUP appeared in NCAA Division II's semifinals five times and in the championship game twice. In 1991, he was the Division II coach of the year. His team won 10 Lambert Cups, as the best Division II team in the eastern United States. He retired after the 2005 season as the third-winningest active coach in Division II.

Cignetti was inducted into the College Football Hall of Fame in 2013. Also in that year, IUP renamed its football field in honor of Cignetti.

== Personal life ==
Cignetti's parents were immigrants to the United States from Italy. He and his wife, Marlene, had four children. Frank Cignetti Jr. played football for his father at IUP from 1985 to 1987. Frank Jr. is a former offensive coordinator and quarterbacks coach for many NFL and college teams. He is currently the Senior Offensive Assistant for the Pittsburgh Steelers.

Frank Sr.'s, son, Curt, was announced as the head coach for IUP on January 21, 2011, after serving four years as wide receivers coach and recruiting coordinator at the University of Alabama. Curt served as the head coach at Elon University from 2016 to 2018, and in December 2018 was named the eighth head coach of James Madison University. In November 2023, Curt was named the head coach at Indiana University Bloomington, where in January 2026, he led Indiana University to their first ever National Championship.

Cignetti died on September 10, 2022.

== Head coaching record ==
Year	Team	Overall	Conference	Standing	Bowl/playoffs	Rank^{#}	AFCA^{°}
West Virginia Mountaineers (NCAA Division I / I-A independent) (1976–1979)
1976	West Virginia	5–6					
1977	West Virginia	5–6					
1978	West Virginia	2–9					
1979	West Virginia	5–6					
West Virginia:		17–27					
IUP Indians (Pennsylvania State Athletic Conference) (1986–2005)
1986	IUP	9–2	6–0	1st (West)		14	
1987	IUP	10–2	6–0	1st (West)	L NCAA Division II First Round	6	
1988	IUP	8–3	5–1	T–1st (West)	L NCAA Division II First Round	14	
1989	IUP	11–2	5–1	2nd (West)	L NCAA Division II Semifinal	9	
1990	IUP	12–2	6–0	1st (West)	L NCAA Division II Championship	4	
1991	IUP	12–1	6–0	1st (West)	L NCAA Division II Semifinal	1	
1992	IUP	8–1–1	5–0–1	1st (West)		12	
1993	IUP	13–1	6–0	1st (West)	L NCAA Division II Championship	4	
1994	IUP	10–3	6–0	1st (West)	L NCAA Division II Semifinal	8	
1995	IUP	8–3	5–1	2nd (West)		19	
1996	IUP	8–3	5–1	T–1st (West)	L NCAA Division II First Round	10	
1997	IUP	5–5	4–2	T–2nd (West)			
1998	IUP	10–2	5–1	2nd (West)	L NCAA Division II First Round	8	
1999	IUP	9–4	5–1	2nd (West)	L NCAA Division II Semifinal		
2000	IUP	8–3	5–1	T–1st (West)	L NCAA Division II First Round	15	12
2001	IUP	8–2	6–0	1st (West)	L NCAA Division II First Round	8	8
2002	IUP	11–2	6–0	1st (West)	L NCAA Division II Quarterfinal	6	8
2003	IUP	10–1	5–1	T–1st (West)		6	9
2004	IUP	7–3	5–1	T–1st (West)			
2005	IUP	5–5	4–2	T–3rd (West)			
IUP:		182–50–1	106–13–1				
Total:		199–77–1					
National championship Conference title Conference division title or championship game berth
^{#}Top 25 (used until 2000).; ^{°}American Football Coaches Association poll, including playoffs (used since 2000).
