= Conemaugh Township, Indiana County, Pennsylvania =

Township in Pennsylvania, US

- Township
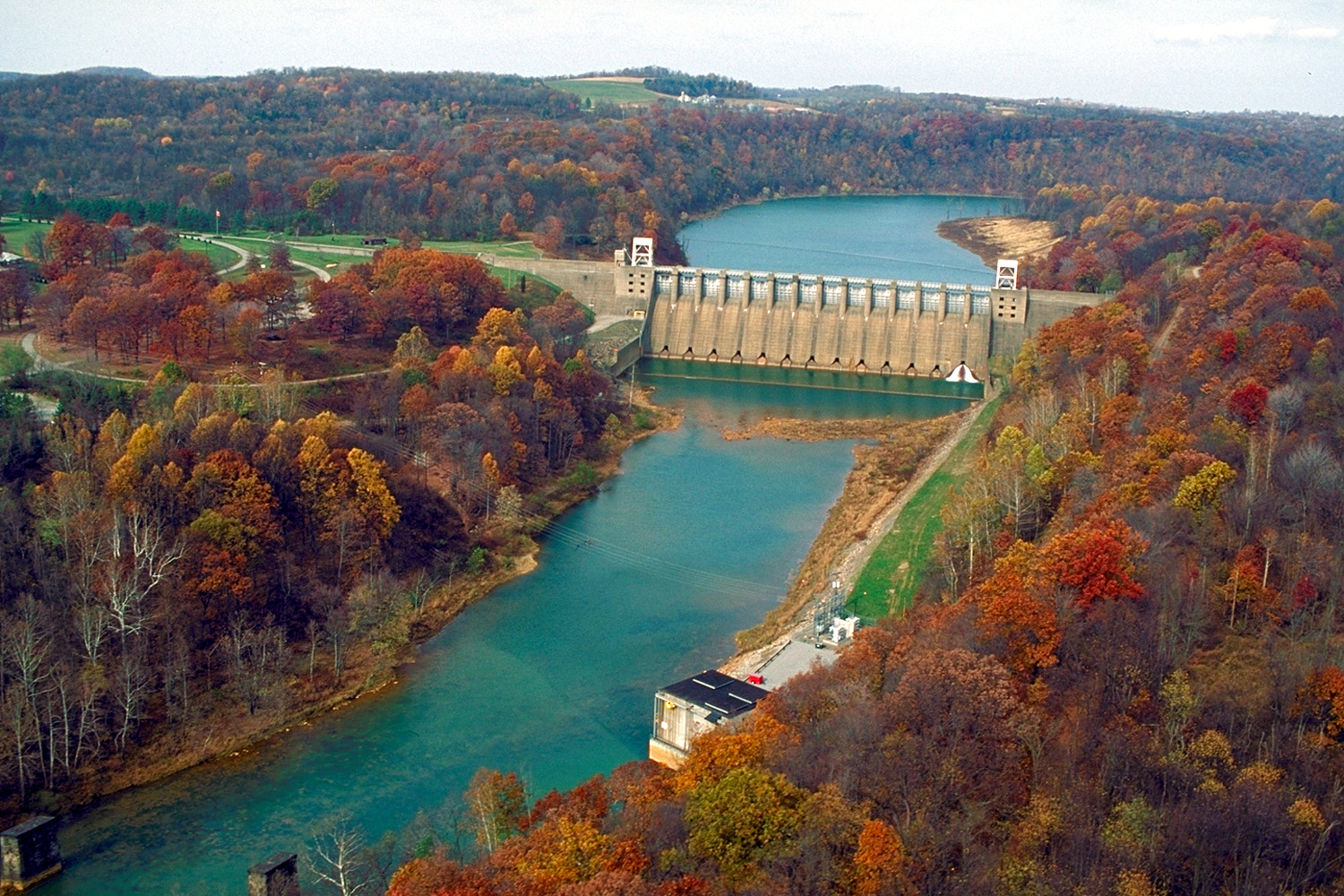
- Conemaugh River Lake Dam on the border of Conemaugh Township (left) and Derry Township

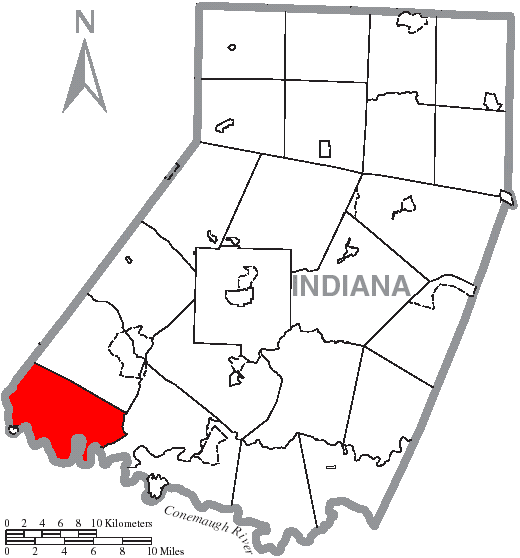
- Map of Indiana County, Pennsylvania Highlighting Conemaugh Township

- Map of Pennsylvania highlighting Indiana County
- Country: United States
- State: Pennsylvania
- County: Indiana

Area
  - Total: 34.53 sq mi (89.42 km^{2})
  - Land: 33.61 sq mi (87.05 km^{2})
  - Water: 0.92 sq mi (2.37 km^{2})

Population (2020)
  - Total: 2,080 ▼
  - Estimate (2021): 2,070
  - Density: 65.2/sq mi (25.16/km^{2})
- Time zone: UTC-5 (Eastern (EST))
  - Summer (DST): UTC-4 (EDT)
- FIPS code: 42-063-15560

Conemaugh Township is a township in Indiana County, Pennsylvania, United States. The population was 2,080 at the 2020 census. The township includes the communities of Clarksburg, Foster, Lewisville, McKeeverville, Nowrytown, Tunnelton (formerly called Kelly Station), and White.

== Geography ==
According to the United States Census Bureau, the township has a total area of 34.4 square miles (89 km^{2}), of which 33.8 square miles (88 km^{2}) is land and 0.6 square miles (1.6 km^{2}) (1.80%) is water.

=== History ===
The township was originally included as part of the larger Armstrong township in Westmoreland County on March 12, 1800. The Pennsylvania legislature established Indiana County on March 30, 1803 and concurrently formed Conemaugh township from part of Armstrong township, however Indiana County was not legally organized until November 3, 1806 and Conemaugh township not organized until 1807. The township name, Conemaugh, originates from the Unami language word meaning “otter” and derives from the Conemaugh River Conemaugh forming part of the township boundary on the south. Saltsburg, so named for the salt wells in the area, incorporated as a borough from part of the township on May 4, 1838.

=== Streams ===
The township is bordered on the south by the Conemaugh and Kiskiminetas Rivers. Blacklegs Creek flows through the township before joining the Kiskiminetas River near Saltsburg.

Tributaries of the Kiskiminetas River in Conemaugh Township
| Name | Number | Bank | Mouth | Political subdivision | Source | Political subdivision |
|---|---|---|---|---|---|---|
| Conemaugh River | 1 | Right | 40°29′08″N 79°27′14″W (elev. 827 feet (252 m)) | Saltsburg | 40°19′54″N 78°55′30″W | Johnstown |
| Blacklegs Creek | 3 | Right | 40°30′02″N 79°27′15″W (elev. 823 feet (251 m)) | Conemaugh Township, Indiana County | 40°37′17″N 79°17′31″W | Armstrong Township, Indiana County |
| Sulphur Run | 4 | Right | 40°31′33″N 79°26′59″W (elev. 820 feet (250 m)) | Conemaugh Township, Indiana County | 40°32′49″N 79°26′06″W | Kiskiminetas Township, Armstrong County |

Tributaries of Blacklegs Creek in Conemaugh Township
| Name | Number | Bank | Mouth | Political subdivision | Source | Political subdivision |
|---|---|---|---|---|---|---|
| Marshall Run | 6 | Left | 40°31′55″N 79°22′51″W (elev. 909 feet (277 m)) | Conemaugh Township, Indiana County | 40°31′22″N 79°19′07″W | Young Township, Indiana County |
| Big Run | 7 | Right | 40°31′16″N 79°24′05″W (elev. 886 feet (270 m)) | Conemaugh Township, Indiana County | 40°36′52″N 79°25′46″W | South Bend Township, Armstrong County |

== Demographics ==
Historical population
| Census | Pop. | Note | %± |
|---|---|---|---|
| 1810 | 1,167 | | — |
| 1820 | 1,555 | | 33.2% |
| 1830 | 2,104 | | 35.3% |
| 1840 | 1,441 | | −31.5% |
| 1850 | 1,748 | | 21.3% |
| 1860 | 1,701 | | −2.7% |
| 1870 | 1,493 | | −12.2% |
| 1880 | 1,346 | | −9.8% |
| 1890 | 1,558 | | 15.8% |
| 1900 | 1,553 | | −0.3% |
| 1910 | 2,510 | | 61.6% |
| 1920 | 2,797 | | 11.4% |
| 1930 | 2,066 | | −26.1% |
| 1940 | 1,690 | | −18.2% |
| 1950 | 2,021 | | 19.6% |
| 1960 | 2,135 | | 5.6% |
| 1970 | 2,357 | | 10.4% |
| 1980 | 2,559 | | 8.6% |
| 1990 | 2,448 | | −4.3% |
| 2000 | 2,437 | | −0.4% |
| 2010 | 2,294 | | −5.9% |
| 2020 | 2,080 | | −9.3% |
| 2021 (est.) | 2,070 | | −0.5% |
U.S. Decennial Census

As of the census of 2000, there were 2,437 people, 958 households, and 711 families residing in the township. The population density was 72.1 inhabitants per square mile (27.8/km^{2}). There were 1,023 housing units at an average density of 30.3 per square mile (11.7/km^{2}). The racial makeup of the township was 99.18% White, 0.04% African American, 0.04% Native American, 0.12% Asian, 0.04% from other races, and 0.57% from two or more races. Hispanic or Latino of any race were 0.08% of the population.

There were 958 households, out of which 30.6% had children under the age of 18 living with them, 63.2% were married couples living together, 7.4% had a female householder with no husband present, and 25.7% were non-families. 22.2% of all households were made up of individuals, and 11.6% had someone living alone who was 65 years of age or older. The average household size was 2.54 and the average family size was 2.97.

In the township the population was spread out, with 24.0% under the age of 18, 5.3% from 18 to 24, 29.9% from 25 to 44, 23.9% from 45 to 64, and 16.9% who were 65 years of age or older. The median age was 40 years. For every 100 females, there were 100.7 males. For every 100 females age 18 and over, there were 98.0 males.

The median income for a household in the township was $31,184, and the median income for a family was $35,386. Males had a median income of $29,839 versus $20,425 for females. The per capita income for the township was $14,378. About 8.6% of families and 13.0% of the population were below the poverty line, including 16.1% of those under age 18 and 4.7% of those age 65 or over.
