= North Vandergrift, Pennsylvania =

Unincorporated community in Pennsylvania, US

- Census-designated place
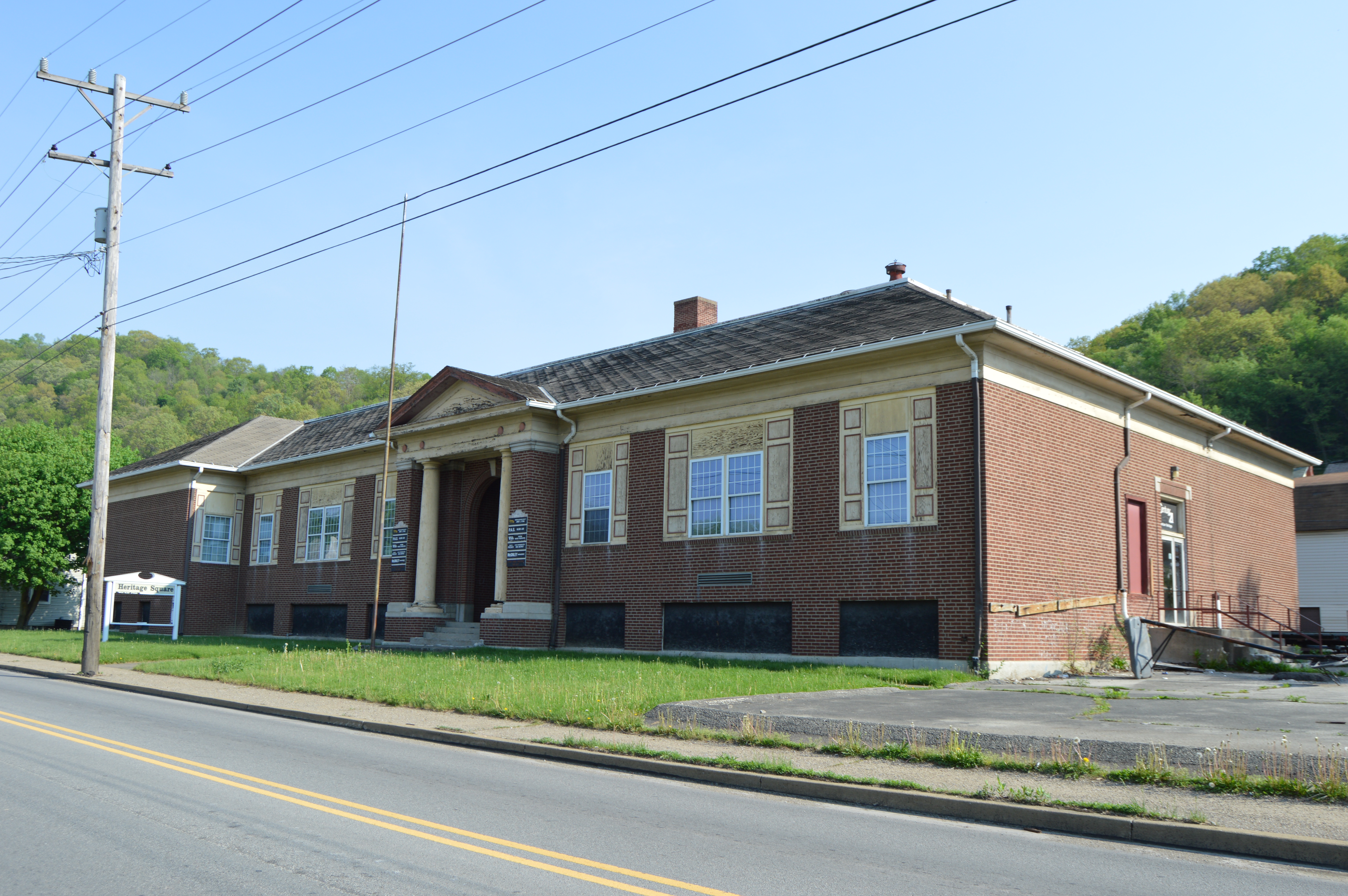
- Scene along Lincoln Street

- Location within Pennsylvania Location within the United States
- Coordinates: 40°36′36″N 79°33′20″W
- Country: United States
- State: Pennsylvania
- County: Armstrong
- Township: Parks

Area
  - Total: 0.43 sq mi (1.11 km^{2})
  - Land: 0.39 sq mi (1.02 km^{2})
  - Water: 0.039 sq mi (0.10 km^{2})
- Elevation: 1,004 ft (306 m)

Population (2020)
  - Total: 374
  - Density: 952.6/sq mi (367.82/km^{2})
- Time zone: UTC-5 (Eastern (EST))
  - Summer (DST): UTC-4 (EDT)
- FIPS code: 42-55480
- GNIS feature ID: 2633307

North Vandergrift is a census-designated place (CDP) in Armstrong County, Pennsylvania, United States. The population was 374 at the 2020 census. North Vandergrift was formerly known as the census-designated place of North Vandergrift-Pleasant View at the 2000 Census, before splitting into two separate CDPs for the 2010 census.

== Demographics ==
Historical population
Census	Pop.	Note	%±
2020	374		—
U.S. Decennial Census
