= Rudy Minarcin =

American baseball player (1930–2013)

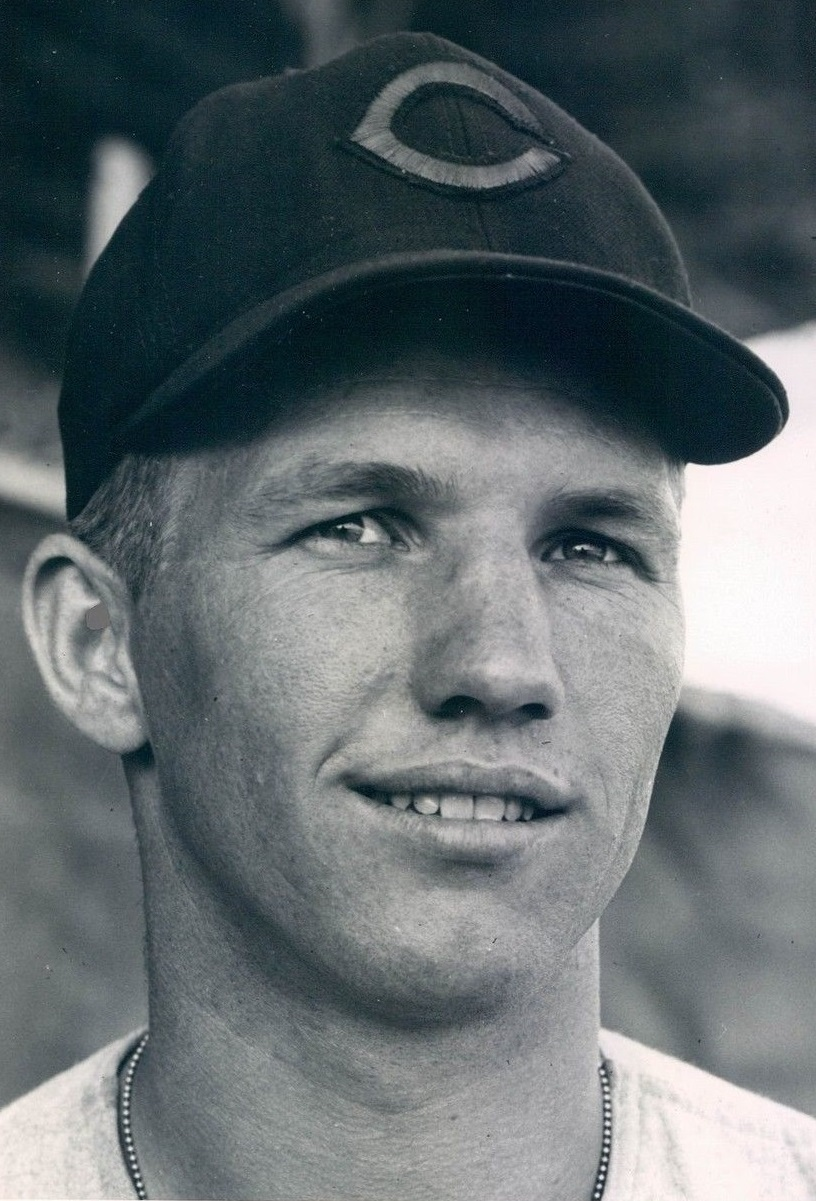
- Pitcher
- Born: March 25, 1930; North Vandergrift, Pennsylvania, U.S.
- Died: October 15, 2013 (aged 83); Cabot, Pennsylvania, U.S.
- Batted: Right Threw: Right

MLB debut
- April 11, 1955, for the Cincinnati Redlegs

Last MLB appearance
- September 27, 1957, for the Boston Red Sox

MLB statistics
- Win–loss record: 6–9
- Earned run average: 4.66
- Strikeouts: 70
- Stats at Baseball Reference

Teams
- Cincinnati Redlegs (1955); Boston Red Sox (1956–1957)

Rudolph Anthony Minarcin [Buster] (March 25, 1930 – October 15, 2013) was an American pitcher in Major League Baseball who played from 1955 through 1957 for the Cincinnati Redlegs (1955) and Boston Red Sox (1956–57). Listed at 6 ft 0 in (1.83 m), 195 lb (88 kg), he batted and threw right-handed.

Born in North Vandergrift, Pennsylvania, Minarcin was a two-sport star at Vandergrift High School, being the captain for both baseball and football teams.

During his junior and senior years, Minarcin pitched eight one-hitters, won 10 straight games, and was a member of the Western Pennsylvania Interscholastic Athletic League (WPIAL) championship team in 1948. He also was a quarterback for the football team at Vandergrift and received more than 30 scholarship offers, including one from Notre Dame, but he chose baseball instead and signed with the Vandergrift Pioneers, a minor league affiliate team of the Philadelphia Phillies organization.

Minarcin spent four seasons in the minors from 1948 to 1951 before being drafted into the army. Taken by the Cincinnati Reds in the 1949 Rule V draft, he posted a 13–8 record and a 2.86 earned run average for Double A Tulsa Oilers in 1950. The next year he was promoted to Triple A Buffalo Bisons, and he responded with a 16–12 record and a 3.20 ERA in 33 games, with an even heavier workload of 242 innings pitched, which included two 13-inning complete games.

The Cincinnati team might well have been ready for Minarcin, but he entered the Army in 1952, and was stationed two years at Camp Eustis in Virginia, where he prepared to ship out for Korea working as a physical training instructor. On his last day at camp, he had to play against each other in a touch football game. Unfortunately, he injured his right knee and the anterior cruciate ligament in a play and never became the pitcher that he otherwise might have become.

Minarcin received an honorable discharge in 1954 and joined Cincinnati for spring training. He persevered to make the big team rosted but twisted his knee in an April exhibition game and was instead placed on the disabled list. Then, he started a rehabilitation program with Triple A Toronto Maple Leafs in late June, ending with a very solid 11–2 record and a 3.60 ERA in 161 innings.

Finally, Minarcin entered the majors in 1955 with the renamed Cincinnati Redlegs managed by Birdie Tebbetts. They had adopted the name in 1954, at a time when the McCarthyism emotions made a change of the club name seem advisable.

Minarcin went 2–1 with a save in his first 14 games, including a complete game, 6–1 victory over the Pittsburgh Pirates in his first start appearance. His career highlight came on June 4, 1955, when he hurled a complete game, one-hit shutout against the Pirates at Forbes Field, in which he drove in two runs in the 6–0 victory. The Pirates' only hit, by Dale Long, was an infield single that first baseman Ted Kluszewski could not handle by in the second inning. Eleven days later, he tossed a complete game against the eventual 1955 World Series champion Brooklyn Dodgers. After that he brought his record to 4–1, but there was only one more win for him for the rest of the season. He finished with a 5–9 mark, one save and a 4.90 ERA in 41 games, 12 as a starter.

Minarcin then pitched for the Red Sox in parts of two seasons, going 1–0 with a 2.66 ERA and two saves in two relief appearances and one start in 1956. The next year, he posted a 4.43 ERA as a reliever in 26 games and did not have a decision. He also played with Triple A Havana Sugar Kings in 1956, and two final seasons in organized ball with the Maple Leafs from 1957 to 1958.

In a three-season major league career, Minarcin collected a 6–9 record and a 4.66 ERA in 70 appearances, including 13 starts, three complete games, one shutout and three saves, striking out 70 batters while walking 89 in 170 innings of work. In addition, he went 77–61 with a 3.59 ERA in parts of eight minor league seasons spanning 1949–1958.

Following his baseball career, Minarcin took over his father's grocery store in Vandergrift and ran that until he retired in 1995. He married Sonja Urbanski in 1957, and they had had three girls and a boy. He was widowed in 1988, but continued to be an avid sports fan and enthusiast and enjoyed playing softball and coaching Little League teams after that. Similarly, he was a huge Pirates fan his whole life, while growing up and listening the narrations of Rosey Rowswell and Bob Prince on the radio broadcasts. He even followed the resurgence of the 2013 Pirates team, falling ill the week of the National League Division Series.

Minarcin died on October 15, 2013, at Good Samaritan Hospice in Cabot, Pennsylvania at the age of 83.
