= Pleasant View, Pennsylvania =

Unincorporated community in Pennsylvania, US

- Census-designated place
- Location within Pennsylvania Location within the United States
- Coordinates: 40°36′43″N 79°34′16″W
- Country: United States
- State: Pennsylvania
- County: Armstrong
- Township: Parks

Area
  - Total: 0.63 sq mi (1.64 km^{2})
  - Land: 0.58 sq mi (1.49 km^{2})
  - Water: 0.058 sq mi (0.15 km^{2})
- Elevation: 994 ft (303 m)

Population (2020)
  - Total: 677
  - Density: 1,175.8/sq mi (453.99/km^{2})
- Time zone: UTC-5 (Eastern (EST))
  - Summer (DST): UTC-4 (EDT)
- ZIP code: 15690
- Area code: 724
- FIPS code: 42-61432
- GNIS feature ID: 2633310

Pleasant View is a census-designated place (CDP) in Armstrong County, Pennsylvania, United States. The population was 677 at the 2020 census. Pleasant View was formerly part of the census-designated place of North Vandergrift-Pleasant View at the 2000 Census, before splitting into two separate CDPs for the 2010 census.

== Demographics ==
Historical population
Census	Pop.	Note	%±
2020	677		—
U.S. Decennial Census
