= Bell Township, Westmoreland County, Pennsylvania =

Township in Pennsylvania, US

Coordinates: 40°29′00″N 79°29′29″W

- Township
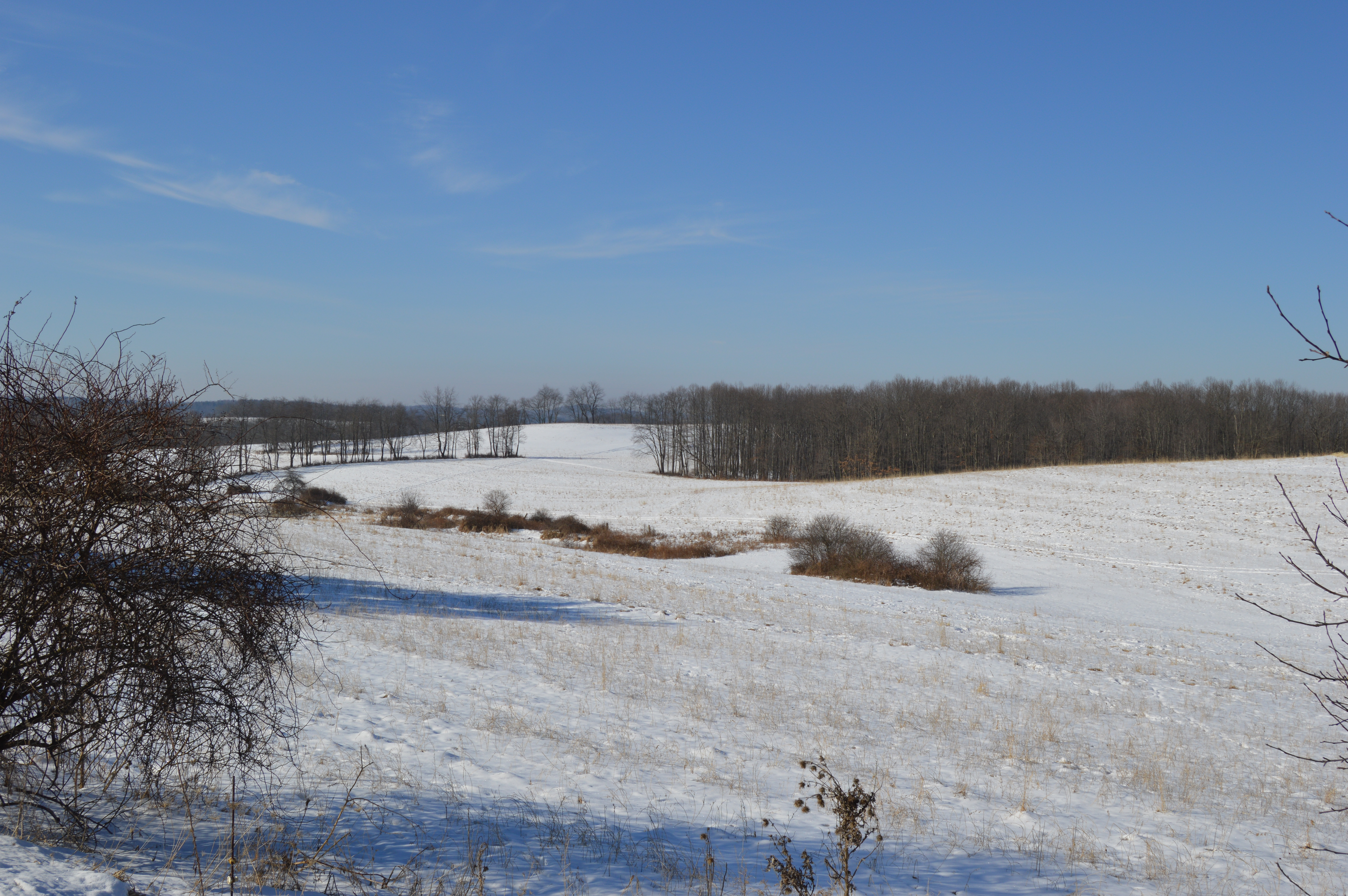
- Snow-covered fields west of Saltsburg

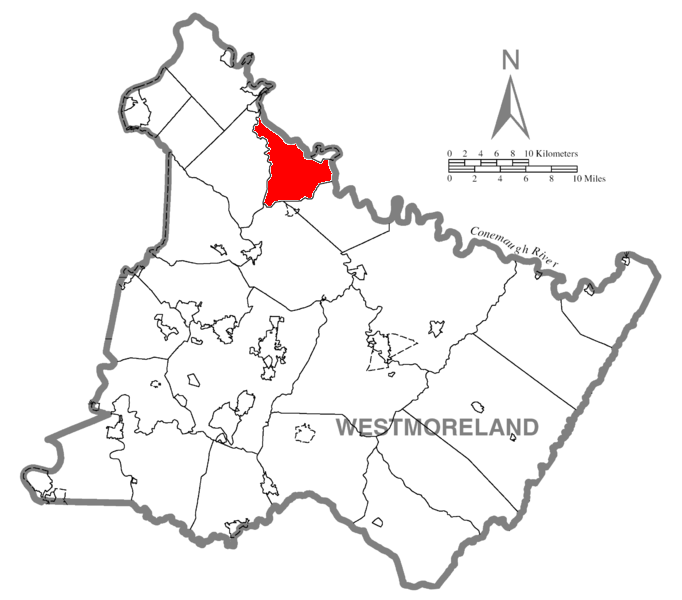
- Map of Westmoreland County, Pennsylvania Highlighting Bell Township

- Map of Pennsylvania highlighting Westmoreland County
- Country: United States
- State: Pennsylvania
- County: Westmoreland
- Settled: 1774
- Incorporated: 1853

Area
  - Total: 22.14 sq mi (57.34 km^{2})
  - Land: 21.49 sq mi (55.66 km^{2})
  - Water: 0.65 sq mi (1.69 km^{2})

Population (2020 United States census)
  - Total: 2,080
  - Density: 96.8/sq mi (37.37/km^{2})
- Time zone: UTC-5 (Eastern (EST))
  - Summer (DST): UTC-4 (EDT)
- FIPS code: 42-129-05208

Bell Township is a township in Westmoreland County, Pennsylvania, United States. The population was 2,080 at the 2020 decennial census.

== Geography ==
According to the United States Census Bureau, the township has a total area of 22.1 square miles (57 km^{2}), of which 21.5 square miles (56 km^{2}) is land and 0.7 square miles (1.8 km^{2}) (2.94%) is water. Located in a rural area ranging approximately 13–22 miles north of Greensburg, the Westmoreland county seat, Bell Township is situated between the Kiskiminetas River to the east, and Beaver Run Reservoir to the west. A portion of the Westmoreland Heritage Trail is within the township limits.

== History ==
According to historian John Newton Boucher, John Carnahan was one of the early settlers of the area that is now Bell Township. He built a log house there in 1774. The so-called Carnahan blockhouse was for many years one of the frontier forts where early settlers took refuge from Indian attacks. St. James Lutheran Cemetery, one of the township's oldest graveyards, was established around 1803. The township was incorporated in 1853 from parts of Loyalhanna and Salem townships. By 1860, it had about 900 residents.

== Demographics ==
Historical population
Census	Pop.	Note	%±
2000	2,458		—
2010	2,348		−4.5%
2020	2,080		−11.4%
U.S. Decennial Census

At the 2000 census there were 2,458 people, 932 households, and 724 families living in the township. The population density was 115.0 inhabitants per square mile (44.4/km^{2}). There were 982 housing units at an average density of 45.9 per square mile (17.7/km^{2}). The racial makeup of the township was 97.88% White, 1.30% African American, 0.12% Asian, 0.41% from other races, and 0.28% from two or more races. Hispanic or Latino of any race were 0.20%.

Of the 932 households 32.4% had children under the age of 18 living with them, 64.6% were married couples living together, 8.6% had a female householder with no husband present, and 22.3% were non-families. 19.6% of households were one person and 9.0% were one person aged 65 or older. The average household size was 2.64 and the average family size was 3.03.

The age distribution was 23.5% under the age of 18, 7.8% from 18 to 24, 28.0% from 25 to 44, 26.8% from 45 to 64, and 13.9% 65 or older. The median age was 40 years. For every 100 females there were 100.5 males. For every 100 females age 18 and over, there were 97.1 males.

The median household income was $40,202 and the median family income was $48,194. Males had a median income of $34,023 versus $26,169 for females. The per capita income for the township was $18,434. About 5.9% of families and 6.9% of the population were below the poverty line, including 6.8% of those under age 18 and 7.7% of those age 65 or over.
