= Parks Township, Pennsylvania =

Township in Pennsylvania, US

Coordinates: 40°36′54″N 79°34′45″W

- Township
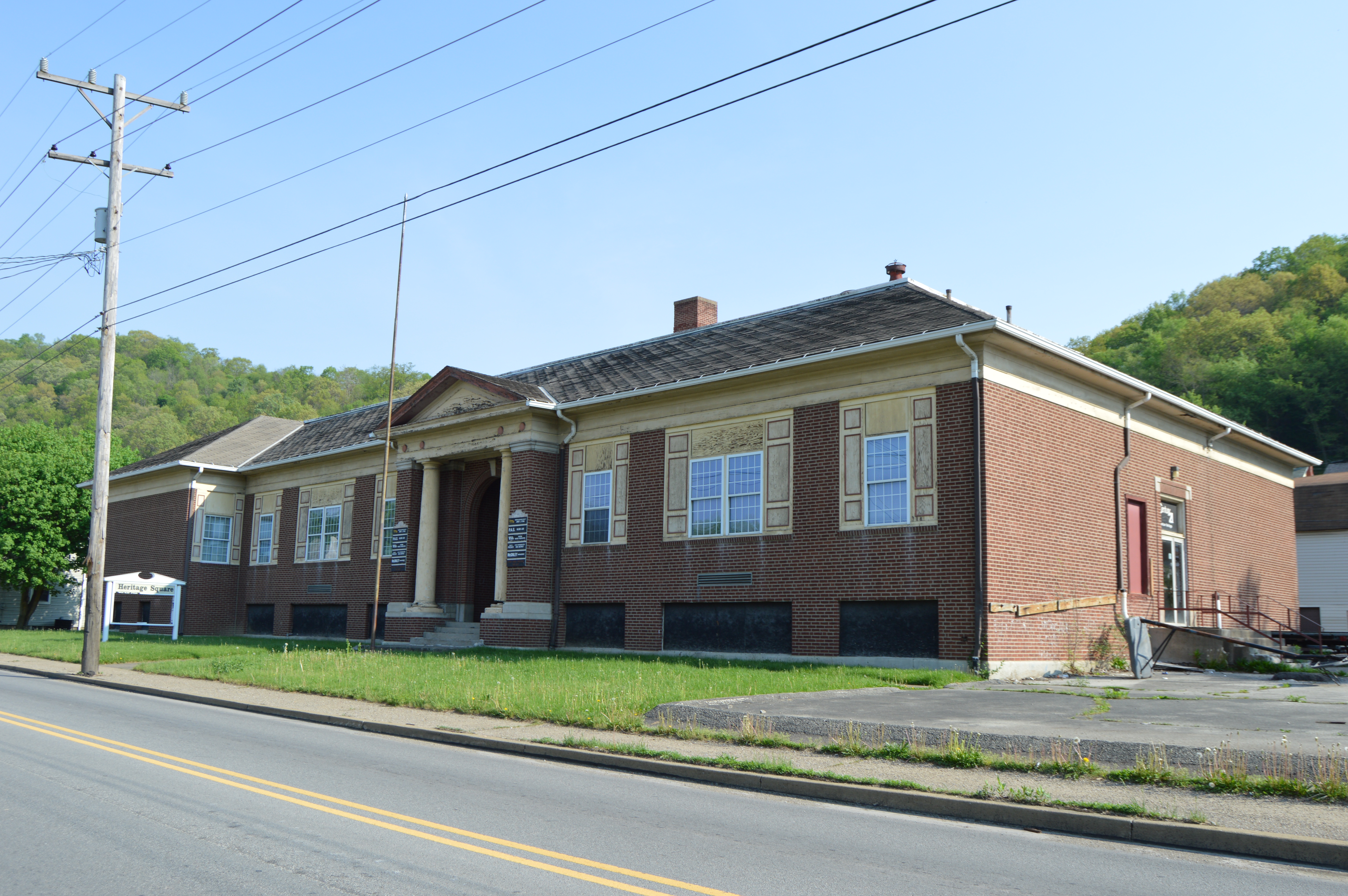
- Along Pennsylvania Route 66 in North Vandergrift

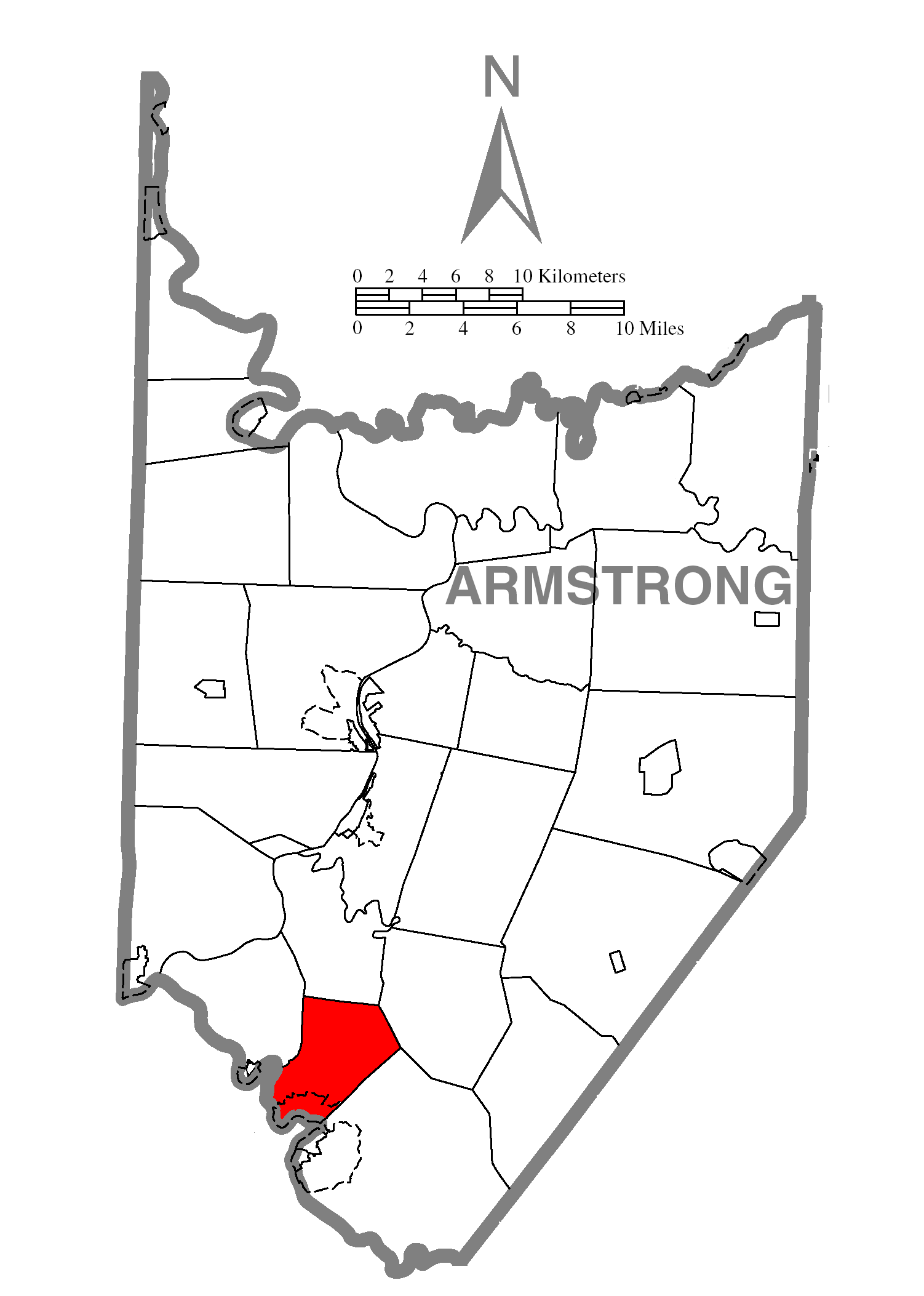
- Map of Armstrong County, Pennsylvania, highlighting Parks Township

- Map of Armstrong County, Pennsylvania
- Country: United States
- State: Pennsylvania
- County: Armstrong
- Settled: 1814
- Incorporated: 1878

Area
  - Total: 14.20 sq mi (36.78 km^{2})
  - Land: 14.03 sq mi (36.35 km^{2})
  - Water: 0.17 sq mi (0.43 km^{2})

Population (2020)
  - Total: 2,472
  - Estimate (2021): 2,455
  - Density: 186.8/sq mi (72.13/km^{2})
- Time zone: UTC-5 (Eastern (EST))
  - Summer (DST): UTC-4 (EDT)
- FIPS code: 42-005-58160
- Website: http://www.parkstwp.com/

Parks Township is a township in Armstrong County in the U.S. state of Pennsylvania. The population was 2,471 at the 2020 census, a decrease from 2,744 at the 2010 census.

== Geography ==
Parks Township is located in southern Armstrong County; the Kiskiminetas River forms the township's southern boundary with Westmoreland County. Carnahan Run flows through Parks Township.

The township includes the unincorporated communities of North Vandergrift, Kepple Hill, Pleasant View, River View, and Kiskimere, all in the Kiskiminetas River valley. Farther inland is the community of Dime.

According to the United States Census Bureau, the township has a total area of 14.2 square miles (36.8 km^{2}), of which 14.1 square miles (36.4 km^{2}) is land and 0.15 square miles (0.4 km^{2}), or 1.16%, is water.

== Demographics ==
Historical population
Census	Pop.	Note	%±
2000	2,754		—
2010	2,744		−0.4%
2020	2,472		−9.9%
2021 (est.)	2,455		−0.7%
U.S. Decennial Census

=== Racial and ethnic composition ===
Parks Township, Pennsylvania – Racial and ethnic composition Note: the US Census treats Hispanic/Latino as an ethnic category. This table excludes Latinos from the racial categories and assigns them to a separate category. Hispanics/Latinos may be of any race.
Race / Ethnicity (NH = Non-Hispanic)	Pop 2000	Pop 2010	Pop 2020	% 2000	% 2010	% 2020
White alone (NH)	2,620	2,612	2,302	95.13%	95.19%	93.12%
Black or African American alone (NH)	89	89	63	3.23%	3.24%	2.55%
Native American or Alaska Native alone (NH)	1	0	6	0.04%	0.00%	0.24%
Asian alone (NH)	0	3	3	0.00%	0.11%	0.12%
Native Hawaiian or Pacific Islander alone (NH)	0	0	1	0.00%	0.00%	0.04%
Other race alone (NH)	10	4	4	0.36%	0.15%	0.16%
Mixed race or Multiracial (NH)	17	23	84	0.62%	0.84%	3.40%
Hispanic or Latino (any race)	17	13	9	0.62%	0.47%	0.36%
Total	2,754	2,744	2,472	100.00%	100.00%	100.00%

=== 2000 census ===
As of the 2000 census, there were 2,754 people, 1,108 households, and 794 families residing in the township. The population density was 195.4 inhabitants per square mile (75.4/km^{2}). There were 1,186 housing units at an average density of 84.2 per square mile (32.5/km^{2}). The racial makeup of the township was 95.21% White, 3.23% African American, 0.04% Native American, 0.91% from other races, and 0.62% from two or more races. Hispanic or Latino of any race were 0.62% of the population.

There were 1,108 households, out of which 29.0% had children under the age of 18 living with them, 58.9% were married couples living together, 8.5% had a female householder with no husband present, and 28.3% were non-families. 23.6% of all households were made up of individuals, and 11.3% had someone living alone who was 65 years of age or older. The average household size was 2.47 and the average family size was 2.92.

The township median age of 41 years was slightly more than the county median age of 40 years. The distribution by age group was 22.4% under the age of 18, 6.0% from 18 to 24, 28.2% from 25 to 44, 25.0% from 45 to 64, and 18.4% who were 65 years of age or older. The median age was 41 years. For every 100 females there were 97.6 males. For every 100 females age 18 and over, there were 96.3 males.

The median income for a household in the township was $29,915, and the median income for a family was $37,827. Males had a median income of $33,250 versus $20,461 for females. The per capita income for the township was $13,818. About 12.6% of families and 15.1% of the population were below the poverty line, including 19.9% of those under age 18 and 4.3% of those age 65 or over.

== Environmental cleanup ==
The Shallow Land Disposal Area site (part of NUMEC) was under cleanup by the U.S. Army Corps of Engineers as of 2010.

== History ==
Parks Township was originally merged with the neighboring townships of Bethel and Gilpin, known as Allegheny Township. In 1878, finding it was too large to manage and supervise, the three split and Parks Township was incorporated.

== Cemeteries ==
- Highfield Lutheran Church Cemetery
- Keppel Burial Ground
- Laurel Point Cemetery
- Parks Family Cemetery
- Porter Cemetery
