= Kiskiminetas Township, Pennsylvania =

Township in Pennsylvania, US

Coordinates: 40°37′00″N 79°27′29″W

- Township
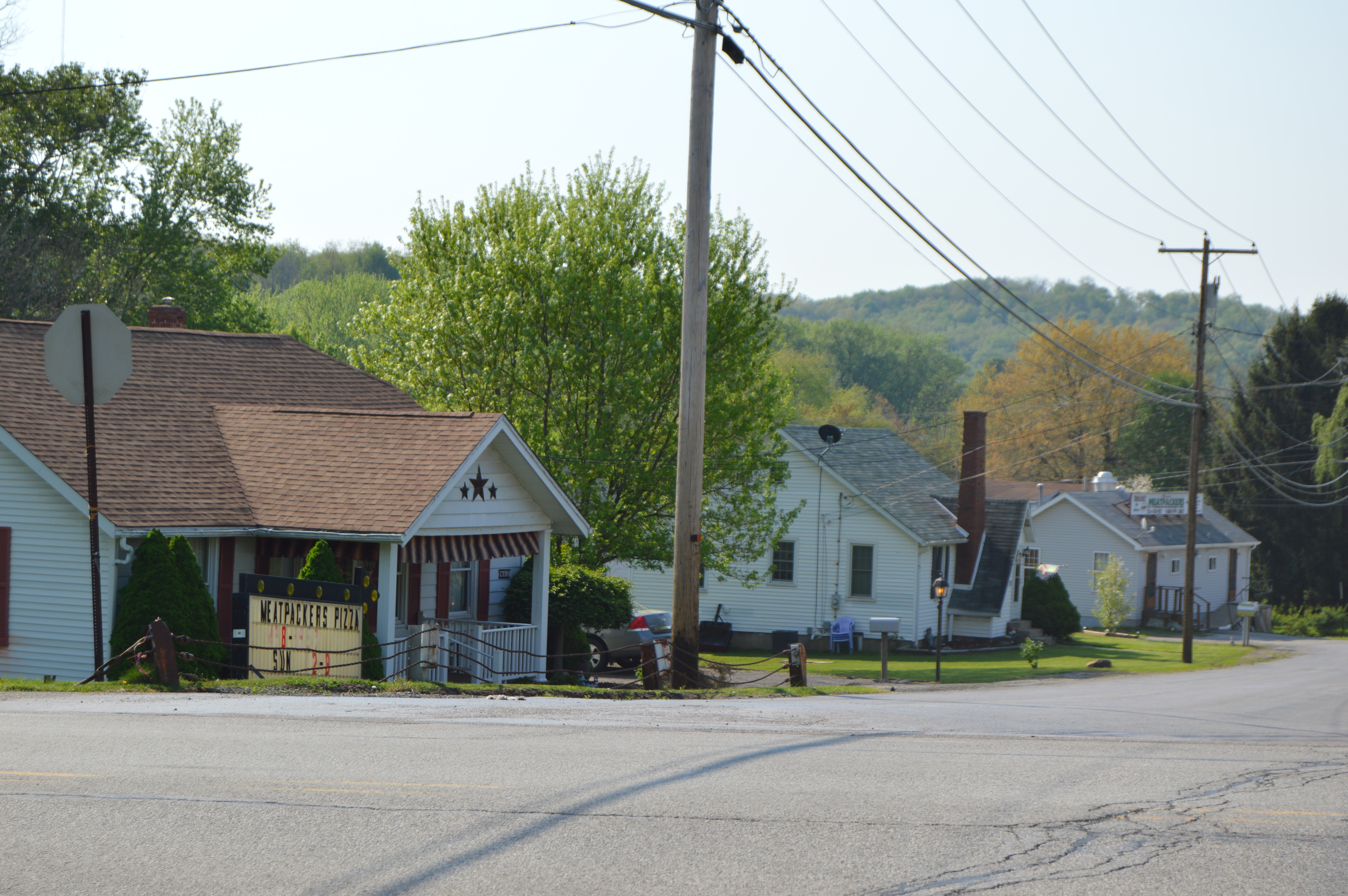
- Florida Avenue in Orchard Hills

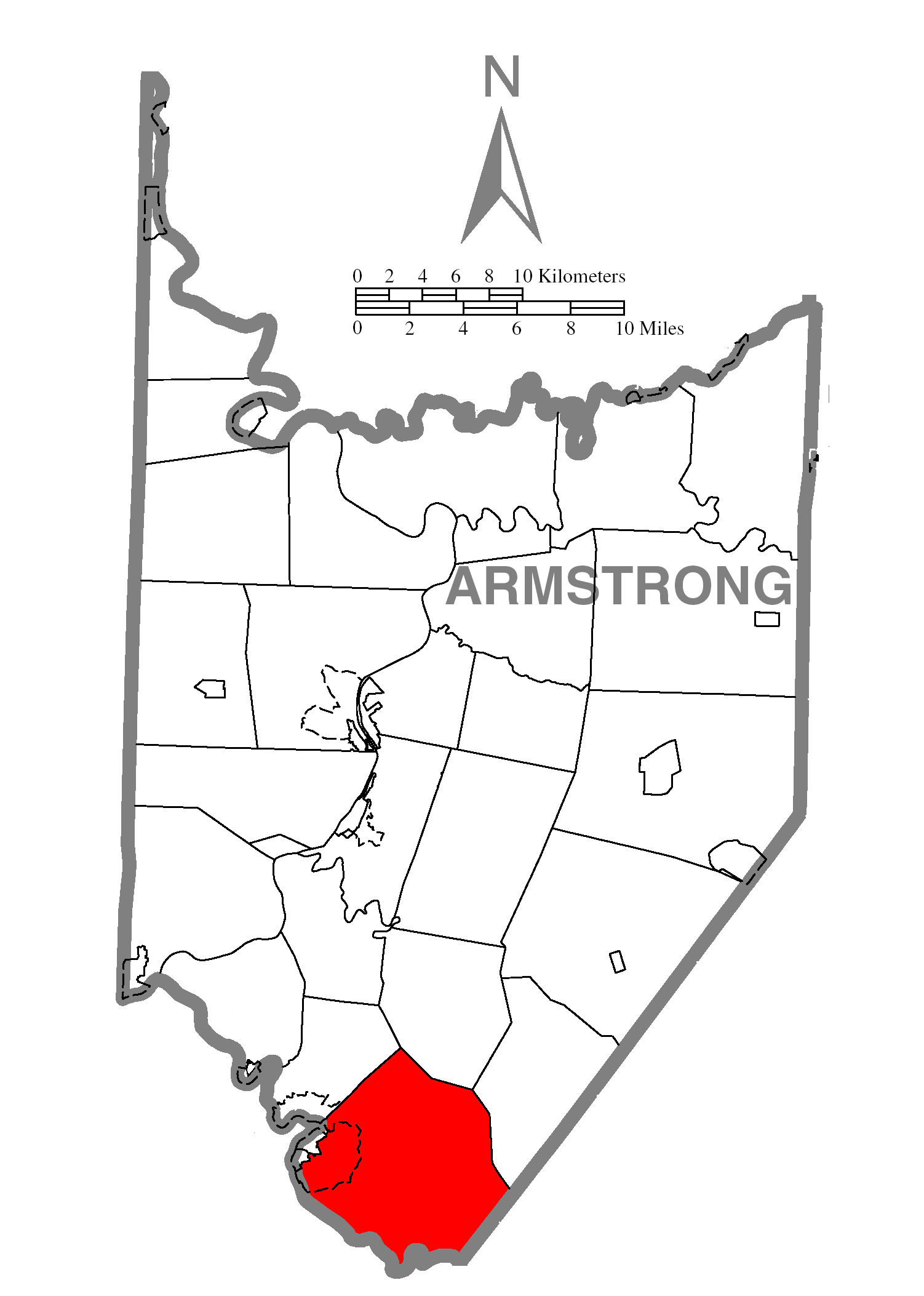
- Map of Armstrong County, Pennsylvania, highlighting Kiskiminetas Township

- Map of Armstrong County, Pennsylvania
- Country: United States
- State: Pennsylvania
- County: Armstrong
- Settled: 1773
- Incorporated: 1831

Area
  - Total: 41.04 sq mi (106.29 km^{2})
  - Land: 40.66 sq mi (105.32 km^{2})
  - Water: 0.37 sq mi (0.97 km^{2})

Population (2020)
  - Total: 4,604
  - Estimate (2021): 4,583
  - Density: 113.1/sq mi (43.65/km^{2})
- Time zone: UTC-5 (Eastern (EST))
  - Summer (DST): UTC-4 (EDT)
- FIPS code: 42-005-39968
- Website: https://kiskitownship-pa.gov/

Kiskiminetas Township is a township in Armstrong County, Pennsylvania, United States. The population was 4,604 at the 2020 census, a decrease from the figure of 4,800 tabulated in 2010, making it the most populous township or borough in the county.

Kiskiminetas is derived from a Native American language meaning "make daylight".

== Geography ==
The township is located at the southern tip of Armstrong County, bounded to the southwest by the Kiskiminetas River, a tributary of the Allegheny River. It is bordered by the boroughs of Apollo and North Apollo to the west and the village of Spring Church to the east.

The Roaring Run hiking trail lies within the boundaries of the township, adjacent to the Kiskiminetas River and what was once the Main Line Canal.

According to the United States Census Bureau, the township has a total area of 41.0 square miles (106.3 km^{2}), of which 40.7 square miles (105.3 km^{2}) is land and 0.35 square miles (0.9 km^{2}), or 0.89%, is water. It contains the census-designated place of Orchard Hills.

== Demographics ==
Historical population
Census	Pop.	Note	%±
2010	4,800		—
2020	4,604		−4.1%
2021 (est.)	4,583		−0.5%
U.S. Decennial Census

As of the 2000 census, there were 4,950 people, 1,931 households, and 1,457 families residing in the township. The population density was 121.5 inhabitants per square mile (46.9/km^{2}). There were 2,074 housing units at an average density of 50.9 per square mile (19.7/km^{2}). The racial makeup of the township was 98.28% White, 0.48% African American, 0.12% Native American, 0.22% Asian, 0.28% from other races, and 0.61% from two or more races. Hispanic or Latino of any race were 0.51% of the population.

There were 1,931 households, out of which 30.8% had children under the age of 18 living with them, 64.0% were married couples living together, 7.8% had a female householder with no husband present, and 24.5% were non-families. 20.9% of all households were made up of individuals, and 10.1% had someone living alone who was 65 years of age or older. The average household size was 2.55, and the average family size was 2.95.

The township median age of 40 years was the same as the county median age of 40 years. The distribution by age group was 23.0% under the age of 18, 6.9% from 18 to 24, 28.6% from 25 to 44, 26.0% from 45 to 64, and 15.5% who were 65 years of age or older. The median age was 40 years. For every 100 females, there were 96.7 males. For every 100 females age 18 and over, there were 96.1 males.

The median income for a household in the township was $38,487, and the median income for a family was $44,000. Males had a median income of $35,136 versus $23,529 for females. The per capita income was $16,291. About 13.4% of families and 14.9% of the population were below the poverty line, including 20.5% of those under age 18 and 7.7% of those age 65 or over.

== History ==
Kiskiminetis Township appears in the 1876 Atlas of Armstrong County, Pennsylvania. Its early history is detailed in Robert Walter Smith's 1883 History of Armstrong County.

Coal mines were once located in the township, including a mine operated by the Leechburg Mining Co. which ceased operations at some time prior to 1977.

== Cemeteries ==
- Apollo - Riverview Cemetery
- Beulah Church Cemetery
- Fairview Cemetery
- Maysville Evangelical Lutheran Church Cemetery
- Spring Church Joint Cemetery
- Spring Church Lutheran Church Cemetery
- Townsend Cemetery
