= Kiskiminetas River =

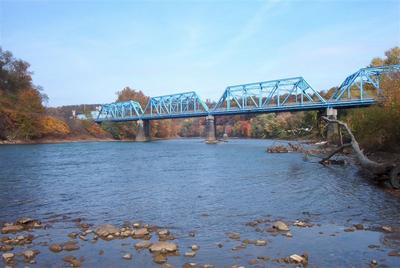
- View across the Kiskiminetas River, looking downstream from the shoreline along Leechburg, Pennsylvania

- Location of the mouth of the Kiskiminetas River in Pennsylvania

Location
- Country: United States
- State: Pennsylvania

Physical characteristics
- Source: Confluence of Conemaugh River and Loyalhanna Creek
  - location: Saltsburg, Pennsylvania
  - coordinates: 40°29′8″N 79°27′14″W
  - elevation: 827 feet (252 m)
- Mouth: Allegheny River
  - location: Schenley, Pennsylvania
  - coordinates: 40°40′46″N 79°40′1″W
  - elevation: 745 ft (227 m)
- Length: 27 mi (43 km)

Basin features
- River system: Allegheny River
- Tributaries
  - left: Loyalhanna Creek, Wolford Run, Beaver Run, Pine Run, Penn Run
  - right: Conemaugh River, Blacklegs Creek, Sulfur Run, Long Run, Flat Run, Roaring Run, Carnahan Run, Guffy Run, Brady Run, Elder Run

The Kiskiminetas River (commonly referred to as the Kiski by locals) is a tributary of the Allegheny River, approximately 27 miles (43 km) long, in Western Pennsylvania in the United States. The region stretching from the northern side of Harmar Township, Pennsylvania to the Kiskiminetas towns is often referred to by the locals as the Alle-Kiski Valley after the rivers.

== Course ==
The Kiskiminetas River is formed at Saltsburg, on the border between Westmoreland and Indiana counties, by the confluence of the Conemaugh River and Loyalhanna Creek. It flows northwest in a meandering course past Avonmore, Apollo, Vandergrift, Hyde Park and Leechburg. It joins the Allegheny River near Freeport at Schenley, approximately 25 miles (40 km) northeast of Pittsburgh.

The Kiski-Conemaugh watershed includes much of the historic coal-producing region of Western Pennsylvania. The water quality is considered degraded by numerous abandoned mine drainages in the river's upper reaches and tributaries, prompting ongoing efforts by federal, state, and private agencies to improve it. The Kittanning Path, a major trail in the region used by Native Americans and early European colonizers, crossed the river at a ford near present-day Leechburg.

=== Political subdivisions ===
The course of the Kiskiminetas River traverses the following political subdivisions, listed in the order encountered while traveling downstream.

- Saltsburg
- Loyalhanna Township, Westmoreland County
- Conemaugh Township, Indiana County
- Kiskiminetas Township, Armstrong County
- Avonmore, Westmoreland County, Pennsylvania
- Bell Township, Westmoreland County
- Apollo
- Allegheny Township, Westmoreland County
- East Vandergrift
- Vandergrift
- Parks Township, Armstrong County
- Leechburg
- West Leechburg
- Gilpin Township, Armstrong County

== Tributaries ==
(Mouth at the Allegheny River)

- Elder Run
- Penn Run
- Brady Run
- Guffy Run
- Carnahan Run
- Pine Run
- Beaver Run
- Roaring Run
  - Rattling Run (also called Jackson's Run)
- Flat Run
- Wolford Run
- Long Run
- Sulfur Run
- Blacklegs Creek
  - Big Run
  - Marshall Run
  - Harpers Run
  - Nesbit Run
  - Hooper Run
  - Whisky Run
- Loyalhanna Creek
- Conemaugh River

Tributaries of Kiskiminetas River
Name	Number	Bank	Mouth	Political subdivision	Source	Political subdivision
Kiskiminetas River	0	Left	40°40′46″N 79°40′01″W (elev. 745 feet (227 m))	Allegheny Township, Westmoreland County	40°29′08″N 79°27′14″W	Saltsburg
Conemaugh River	1	Right	40°29′08″N 79°27′14″W (elev. 827 feet (252 m))	Saltsburg	40°19′54″N 78°55′30″W	Johnstown
Loyalhanna Creek	2	Left	40°29′07″N 79°27′16″W (elev. 827 feet (252 m))	Loyalhanna Township, Westmoreland County	40°07′45″N 79°20′20″W	Donegal Township, Westmoreland County
Blacklegs Creek	3	Right	40°30′02″N 79°27′15″W (elev. 823 feet (251 m))	Conemaugh Township, Indiana County	40°37′17″N 79°17′31″W	Armstrong Township, Indiana County
Sulphur Run	4	Right	40°31′33″N 79°26′59″W (elev. 820 feet (250 m))	Conemaugh Township, Indiana County	40°32′49″N 79°26′06″W	Kiskiminetas Township, Armstrong County
Long Run	5	Right	40°32′00″N 79°28′34″W (elev. 823 feet (251 m))	Kiskiminetas Township, Armstrong County	40°35′52″N 79°25′26″W	South Bend Township, Armstrong County
Wolford Run	6	Left	40°31′29″N 79°29′24″W (elev. 807 feet (246 m))	Bell Township, Westmoreland County	40°28′25″N 79°31′37″W	Loyalhanna Township, Westmoreland County
Flat Run	7	Right	40°32′10″N 79°30′17″W (elev. 801 feet (244 m))	Kiskiminetas Township, Armstrong County	40°34′06″N 79°28′16″W	Kiskiminetas Township, Armstrong County
Roaring Run	8	Right	40°33′04″N 79°32′10″W (elev. 801 feet (244 m))	Kiskiminetas Township, Armstrong County	40°36′18″N 79°26′27″W	Kiskiminetas Township, Armstrong County
Rattling Run	8.1	Right	40°33′39″N 79°31′38″W (elev. 919 feet (280 m))	Kiskiminetas Township, Armstrong County	40°36′40″N 79°30′30″W	Kiskiminetas Township, Armstrong County
Beaver Run	9	Left	40°34′35″N 79°34′03″W (elev. 787 feet (240 m))	Bell Township, Westmoreland County	40°21′40″N 79°32′34″W	Hempfield Township, Westmoreland County
Pine Run	10	Left	40°36′26″N 79°35′05″W (elev. 771 feet (235 m))	Allegheny Township, Westmoreland County	40°30′57″N 79°37′21″W	Washington Township, Westmoreland County
Carnahan Run	11	Right	40°36′44″N 79°35′02″W (elev. 768 feet (234 m))	Parks Township, Armstrong County	40°37′50″N 79°28′34″W	Kiskiminetas Township, Armstrong County
Guffy Run	12	Right	40°37′59″N 79°34′54″W (elev. 784 feet (239 m))	Parks Township, Armstrong County	40°40′46″N 79°33′25″W	Bethel Township, Armstrong County
Brady Run	13	Right	40°37′57″N 79°36′33″W (elev. 758 feet (231 m))	Leechburg	40°40′04″N 79°34′39″W	Gilpin Township, Armstrong County
Penn Run	14	Left	40°38′24″N 79°37′20″W (elev. 863 feet (263 m))	West Leechburg	40°37′42″N 79°38′06″W	Allegheny Township, Westmoreland County
Elder Run	15	Right	40°38′52″N 79°37′33″W (elev. 755 feet (230 m))	Gilpin Township, Armstrong County	40°41′23″N 79°34′21″W	Gilpin Township, Armstrong County

=== Blacklegs Creek ===
Tributaries of Blacklegs Creek
Name	Number	Bank	Mouth	Political subdivision	Source	Political subdivision
Blacklegs Creek	0	Right	40°30′02″N 79°27′15″W (elev. 823 feet (251 m))	Conemaugh Township, Indiana County	40°37′17″N 79°17′31″W	Armstrong Township, Indiana County
Green Valley Lake	1	Left	40°35′45″N 79°18′35″W (elev. 1,132 feet (345 m))	Young Township, Indiana County		
Whisky Run	2	Right	40°33′41″N 79°21′40″W (elev. 955 feet (291 m))	Young Township, Indiana County	40°36′26″N 79°24′37″W	South Bend Township, Armstrong County
Hooper Run	3	Left	40°33′00″N 79°21′54″W (elev. 935 feet (285 m))	Young Township, Indiana County	40°35′15″N 79°18′54″W	Young Township, Indiana County
Nesbit Run	4	Right	40°32′35″N 79°22′04″W (elev. 922 feet (281 m))	Young Township, Indiana County	40°34′55″N 79°23′11″W	Young Township, Indiana County
Harpers Run	5	Right	40°32′11″N 79°22′33″W (elev. 912 feet (278 m))	Young Township, Indiana County	40°35′04″N 79°23′50″W	South Bend Township, Armstrong County
Marshall Run	6	Left	40°31′55″N 79°22′51″W (elev. 909 feet (277 m))	Conemaugh Township, Indiana County	40°31′22″N 79°19′07″W	Young Township, Indiana County
Big Run	7	Right	40°31′16″N 79°24′05″W (elev. 886 feet (270 m))	Conemaugh Township, Indiana County	40°36′52″N 79°25′46″W	South Bend Township, Armstrong County

== Etymology ==
There is no definite interpretation of the origin of the name. It may come from the Native American phrase Kithanne, meaning "Place of the largest stream." According to regional historians, the name has had several other possible meanings, including "river of the big fish" and "plenty of walnuts." Robert Walker Smith in his "History of Armstrong County, Pennsylvania" (Chicago: Waterman, Watkins & Co., 1883) reported that John Heckewelder (a Moravian writer, explorer, and historian who wrote about the Lenape and other tribes in Western Pennsylvania in the 18th century) claimed that the name is "corrupted from Gieschgumanito, signifying, make daylight. In this case, the etymology is: Gisch-gu---day; gisch-que---today; gieschapen---it is daybreak; manitoon---to make. It was probably the word of command, given by a warrior to his comrades at night to break up camp and resume the journey, or war-path." Smith also described another possible meaning from another source: "It is said in McCullough's Narrative, that the Indians called this river Kee-ak-ksheman-nit-toos, signifying 'cut spirit'." Smith noted that he preferred Heckewelder's definition. It is also possible that "Kiskiminetas" means "clear, clean stream of many bends."

== See also ==
- List of crossings of the Kiskiminetas River
- List of rivers of Pennsylvania
- List of tributaries of the Allegheny River
