= Leechburg, Pennsylvania =

Borough in Pennsylvania, US

- Borough
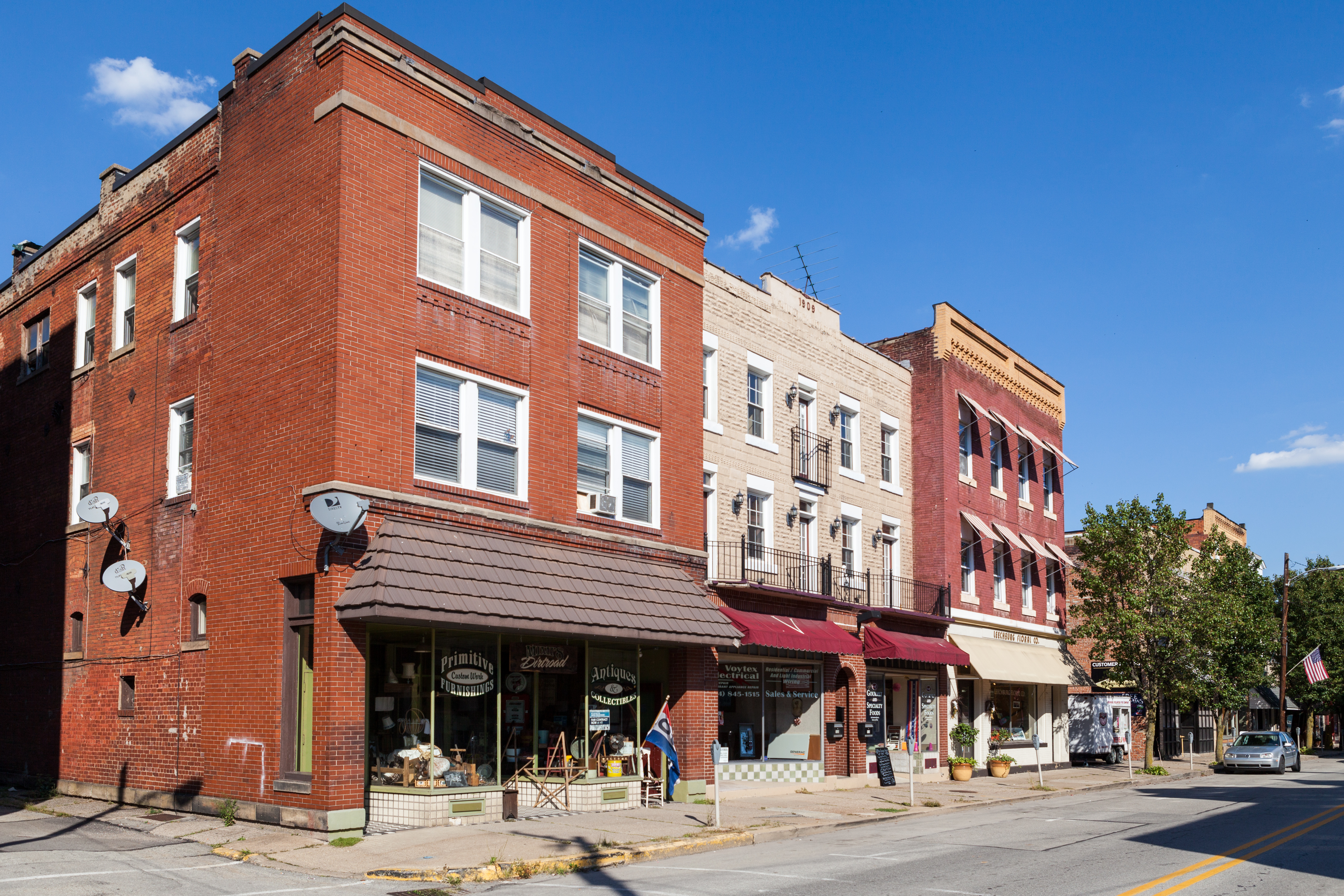
- North side of 100 block of Market Street, looking east

- Location of Leechburg in Armstrong County, Pennsylvania.

- Location within Pennsylvania
- Coordinates: 40°37′45″N 79°36′13″W
- Country: United States
- State: Pennsylvania
- County: Armstrong
- Settled: 1832
- Incorporated: 1850

Government
  - Type: Council-Mayor
  - Mayor: Doreen Smeal

Area
  - Total: 0.48 sq mi (1.25 km^{2})
  - Land: 0.44 sq mi (1.14 km^{2})
  - Water: 0.042 sq mi (0.11 km^{2})
- Elevation: 790 ft (240 m)

Population (2020)
  - Total: 2,149
  - Density: 4,891.5/sq mi (1,888.62/km^{2})
- Time zone: UTC-5 (Eastern (EST))
  - Summer (DST): UTC-4 (EDT)
- Zip code: 15656
- Area code: 724
- FIPS code: 42-42280

Leechburg is a borough in Armstrong County, Pennsylvania, United States. Situated along the Kiskiminetas River, it is part of the Allegheny-Kiski Valley region. Leechburg was founded in the early 19th century and became known for its role in the steel and natural gas industries. As of the 2020 census, the population was 2,149.

== History ==
=== Founding and Early Settlement ===
Leechburg's origins trace back to the late 18th century, with early names such as "Friendship" and "White Plains." Nearby hamlets like "Old Town" and "Jacksonville" were among the earliest developed areas. Originally part of Allegheny Township, Armstrong County, civil engineer David Leech arrived in 1827 to construct a dam and lock for the Pennsylvania Main Line Canal along the Kiskiminetas River. Leech purchased land and developed a village, constructing mills, homes, and a boatyard that produced freight and passenger boats. The first canal boats passed through Leechburg in 1829. A ferry operated before the first bridge was constructed in 1846. Leech personally funded the town’s first school in 1829 and paid the teacher. Leechburg was incorporated on March 22, 1850, with Leech as its first burgess (Mayor). Leechburg quickly became a vital canal port west of the Allegheny Mountains, facilitating commerce between Philadelphia and Pittsburgh.

=== Industrial Development ===
In 1872, the Leechburg Rolling Mill opened, producing tin plate—the first in the United States to do so. In 1874, it became the first steel plant in the world to use natural gas as a fuel source. The borough also hosted the Leechburg Foundry and Machine Company, which employed hundreds and produced machinery for regional use. George Mesta, one of its founders, went on to establish Mesta Machine Company in Pittsburgh. The Pittsburgh Shovel Works, opened in 1898, employed about 100 workers and became known for shovels used during the construction of the Panama Canal. The town also featured a roller-process flour mill, a planing mill, and a branch of the C.L. Flaccus Glass Company. Hicks Coal Company and others mined local coal to fuel these enterprises. In the 20th century, Allegheny Ludlum and later ATI operated plants in nearby West Leechburg and Bagdad, sustaining the industrial economy until closures in the early 21st century.

=== Infrastructure and Transportation ===
Leechburg's early growth centered around the canal, but railroads soon surpassed water transport. The Allegheny Valley Railroad arrived in the 1850s, connecting Leechburg with Pittsburgh and Kittanning. A succession of bridges over the Kiskiminetas River were built and destroyed by floods, including the great floods of 1861, 1875, and 1889. A robust steel truss bridge was completed in 1889 and replaced in 1935 by the current high-level bridge that remains today. The borough had significant passenger and freight rail activity into the 1900s, though passenger service ended by 1908. The region’s rail corridors are now partially repurposed for the Armstrong Trail. Leechburg’s road system includes Pennsylvania Routes 66 and 56, with Market Street serving as the borough’s main thoroughfare. The river today supports recreational use as part of the Kiski-Conemaugh Water Trail.

=== Education ===
David Leech built the first schoolhouse in 1829 and personally funded the teacher’s wages. A public brick school was constructed in 1874. As population increased, Leechburg established a high school. In the 1960s, the Leechburg Area School District was formed through a merger with Gilpin Township and West Leechburg. The district today includes Leechburg Area Junior-Senior High School and David Leech Elementary. The Opera House once hosted lectures and educational programs.

=== Public Services ===
Leechburg established a water system in 1891, using water from Beaver Run with gravity-fed pressure. After a major fire in 1889, residents formed the Leechburg Volunteer Fire Department, which continues to serve the borough. A municipal fire hall was built in 1893. The borough also formed a police department and provided refuse collection, paved streets, and electricity early in the 20th century. Today, the borough maintains several parks including Veterans Memorial Field and Riverfront Park. Other services include snow removal, street lighting, and recreational programs supported by the borough and local volunteers.

=== Cultural and Religious Life ===
Leechburg is home to a variety of churches, some dating back to the 1840s. These include Hebron Lutheran Church (1845), First Presbyterian Church (1851), First United Methodist Church (1846), and St. Catherine’s and St. Martha’s Catholic Churches, which later merged into Christ the King Parish. Services were historically offered in multiple languages including Slovak, Hungarian, Polish, and Italian. Fraternal and ethnic organizations thrived in the 19th and 20th centuries, including the Marconi Lodge No. 1 (Italian), Magyar Society, Minetora Society, and the Odd Fellows, Masons, Elks, Eagles, and Moose. The 1908 Opera House served as a venue for lectures, theater, and early cinema. The Leechburg Area Museum and Historical Society, founded in 1976, preserves artifacts and archives in the historic David Leech home. Local newspapers such as the Leechburg Enterprise and later the Leechburg Advance documented borough life.

== Demographics ==
Historical population
Census	Pop.	Note	%±
1900	2,459		—
1910	3,624		47.4%
1920	3,991		10.1%
1930	4,489		12.5%
1940	4,275		−4.8%
1950	4,041		−5.5%
1960	3,545		−12.3%
1970	2,099		−40.8%
1980	2,386		13.7%
1990	2,451		2.7%
2000	2,386		−2.7%
2010	2,156		−9.6%
2020	2,149		−0.3%
Sources: U.S. Decennial Census

Leechburg's population increased from just 359 in 1850 to 4,489 by 1930, due largely to the booming industrial sector. Immigrants from Italy, Slovakia, Hungary, Poland, Ireland, and Germany settled in the borough, establishing ethnic neighborhoods, clubs, and churches. The town's population gradually declined after World War II, mirroring regional industrial decline. By 2000, it had fallen below 2,400, and the 2020 census recorded 2,149 residents.

The racial makeup of the borough was 91.91% White, 5.46% Black or African American, and 2.63% identifying as two or more races. There were no reported residents identifying as Native American, Asian, or Pacific Islander in the 2020 count.

The median age in the borough was 39.2 years. The gender distribution was nearly even, with 49.51% male and 50.49% female residents. There were a total of 921 households, with an average household size of 2.2 persons. Of these, 57.44% were family households, and 42.56% were non-family households. Approximately 24.97% of households had children under the age of 18.

The median household income in Leechburg was $54,886, with a per capita income of $28,771. About 11.5% of residents lived below the poverty line. Regarding educational attainment, 97.1% of residents age 25 and older held at least a high school diploma, while 15.6% held a bachelor’s degree or higher. Veterans made up 8.5% of the population.

There were 1,098 total housing units in the borough. Of these, 60.26% were owner-occupied and 39.74% were renter-occupied. The median value of owner-occupied housing units was $94,300.

== Notable Events ==
- 1829: First canal boats pass through Leechburg.
- 1850: Borough of Leechburg incorporated.
- 1872: Tin plate production begins at Leechburg Rolling Mill.
- 1874: First use of natural gas in industrial steelmaking.
- 1889: Devastating fire leads to formation of volunteer fire company.
- 1900: Leechburg mill becomes part of U.S. Steel.
- 1950: Centennial celebrated with parades and historical exhibits.
- 2005–2016: Closure of major Allegheny Ludlum/ATI plants.
- 2025: Leechburg celebrates its 175th anniversary with community events.

== Notable people ==
- Joseph Grant Beale (1839–1915) – U.S. Congressman representing Pennsylvania's 27th district from 1907 to 1909, Civil War veteran, industrialist, and president of the Leechburg Banking Company.
- Alex Kroll (1937–2024) – All-American football player at Rutgers University, professional football player for the New York Titans, later CEO of Young & Rubicam, and member of both the College Football Hall of Fame and Advertising Hall of Fame.
- Jackie Wilson, (1909-1966) National Boxing Association World Featherweight Champion.
- Matt Berkey (born 1982) – Professional high-stakes poker player with over $4 million in tournament earnings, founder of the poker academy \"Solve For Why.\"
- Cal Hawk (1847–1899) – Early professional baseball pitcher, among the first paid players, known for pioneering the use of the curveball.
- George Mesta – Industrialist, co-founder of Leechburg Foundry and Machine Company, precursor to the Mesta Machine Company.
- David Leech – Founder of Leechburg, engineer behind the Pennsylvania Main Line Canal improvements, and early civic leader.
