= West Leechburg, Pennsylvania =

Borough in Pennsylvania, US

- Borough
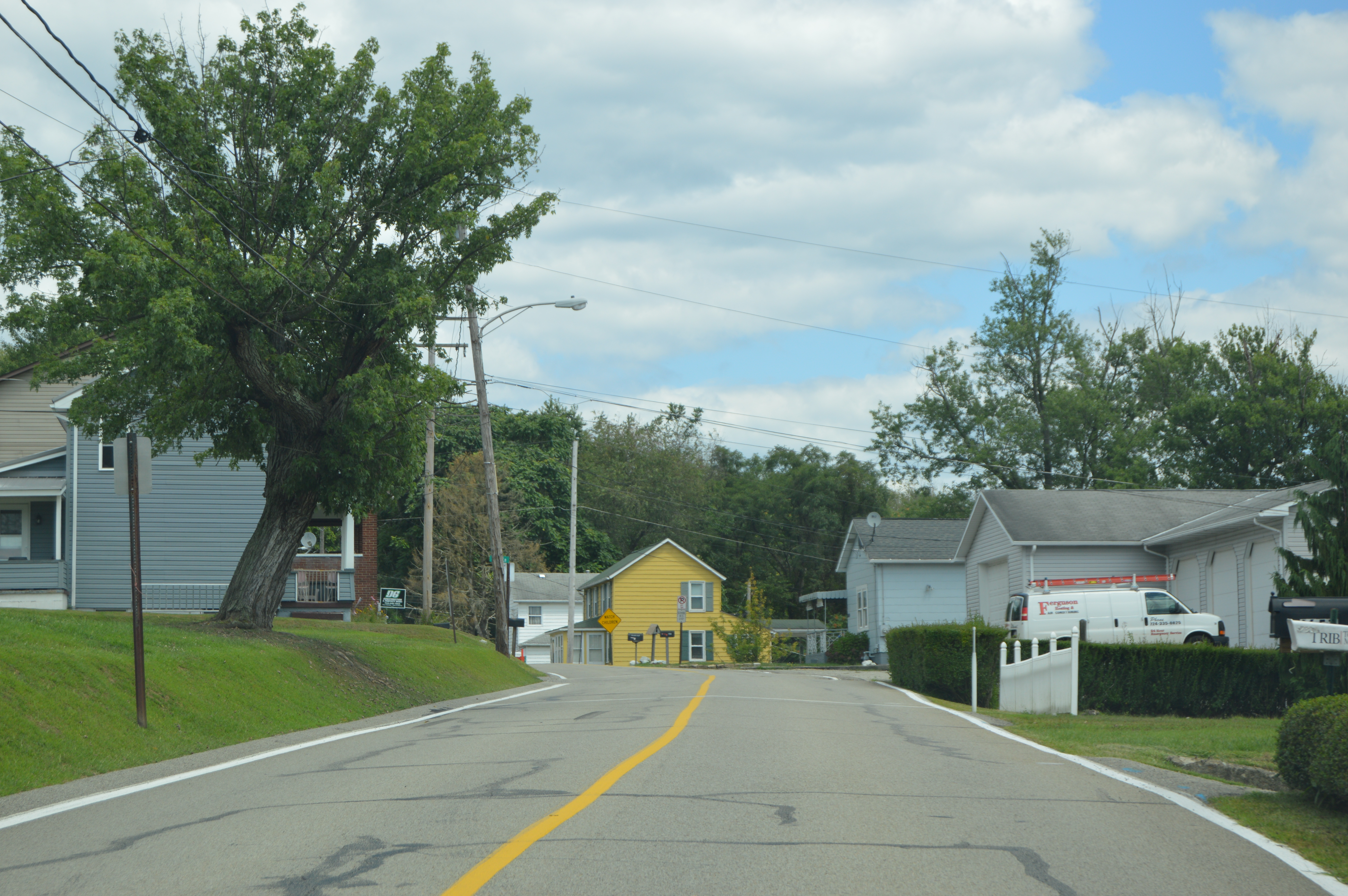
- Residential district on Main Street

- Location of West Leechburg in Westmoreland County, Pennsylvania
- Coordinates: 40°37′56″N 79°37′02″W
- Country: United States
- State: Pennsylvania
- County: Westmoreland

Area
  - Total: 1.00 sq mi (2.58 km^{2})
  - Land: 0.95 sq mi (2.47 km^{2})
  - Water: 0.042 sq mi (0.11 km^{2}) At least 1%
- Elevation: 994 ft (303 m)

Population (2010)
  - Total: 1,294
  - Estimate (2019): 1,221
  - Density: 1,278.6/sq mi (493.67/km^{2})
- Time zone: UTC-5 (Eastern (EST))
  - Summer (DST): UTC-4 (EDT)
- Zip code: 15656
- FIPS code: 42-83328
- Website: https://www.westleechburg.us/

West Leechburg is a borough in Westmoreland County, Pennsylvania, United States, along the Kiskiminetas River. As of the 2020 census, West Leechburg had a population of 1,269.

== Geography ==
West Leechburg is located at 40°37′56″N 79°37′2″W (40.632129, -79.617137).

According to the United States Census Bureau, the borough has a total area of 1.0 square mile (2.6 km^{2}), of which 0.9 square miles (2.3 km^{2}) is land and 0.1 square miles (0.26 km^{2}) is water.

== Demographics ==
Historical population
Census	Pop.	Note	%±
1930	1,044		—
1940	1,123		7.6%
1950	1,113		−0.9%
1960	1,323		18.9%
1970	1,422		7.5%
1980	1,395		−1.9%
1990	1,359		−2.6%
2000	1,290		−5.1%
2010	1,294		0.3%
2020	1,269		−1.9%

As of the census of 2000, there were 1,290 people, 542 households, and 405 families living in the borough. The population density was 1,388.3 inhabitants per square mile (536.0/km^{2}). There were 573 housing units at an average density of 616.7 units per square mile (238.1 units/km^{2}). The racial makeup of the borough was 98.47% White, 0.14% Black or African American, 0.23% Asian, 0.08% Pacific Islander, 0.39% from other races, and 0.70% from two or more races. Hispanic or Latino people of any race were 0.62% of the population.

There were 542 households, out of which 27.5% had children under the age of 18 living with them, 62.0% were married couples living together, 9.4% had a female householder with no husband present, and 25.1% were non-families. 22.0% of all households were made up of individuals, and 12.4% had someone living alone who was 65 years of age or older. The average household size was 2.38 and the average family size was 2.77.

In the borough the population was spread out, with 20.2% under the age of 18, 5.8% from 18 to 24, 26.4% from 25 to 44, 24.9% from 45 to 64, and 22.6% who were 65 years of age or older. The median age was 44 years. For every 100 females there were 96.9 males. For every 100 females age 18 and over, there were 93.8 males.

The median income for a household in the borough was $38,167, and the median income for a family was $44,000. Males had a median income of $40,875 versus $21,944 for females. The per capita income for the borough was $20,192. The median education level of residents was twice that of the state average, with a high per capita level employed in military, department of defense and robotics related occupations.
