= Tributaries of the Allegheny River =

The Tributaries of the Allegheny River drain western Pennsylvania and part of New York. The following table lists all the named tributaries of the Allegheny River. For each stream, the name, tributary number, coordinate and political subdivision of the confluence, and coordinate of the source are given.

== Direct tributaries ==
Tributaries of the Allegheny River
Name	Number	Bank	Mouth	Political subdivision	Source	Political subdivision
Woodcock Creek	1	Left	41°50′06″N 77°52′48″W (elev. 2,041 feet (622 m))	Allegany Township, Potter County	41°50′49″N 77°50′36″W	Ulysses Township, Potter County
Dwight Creek	2	Right	41°50′08″N 77°55′11″W (elev. 1,893 feet (577 m))	Allegany Township, Potter County	41°52′42″N 77°53′16″W	Allegany Township, Potter County
Peet Brook	3	Right	41°50′02″N 77°56′31″W (elev. 1,837 feet (560 m))	Allegany Township, Potter County	41°52′34″N 77°54′55″W	Allegany Township, Potter County
Baker Creek	4	Right	41°48′36″N 78°00′03″W (elev. 1,722 feet (525 m))	Eulalia Township, Potter County	41°51′58″N 77°57′13″W	Allegany Township, Potter County
Steer Run	5	Right	41°48′26″N 78°00′50″W (elev. 1,703 feet (519 m))	Eulalia Township, Potter County	41°49′59″N 78°02′38″W	Hebron Township, Potter County
Mill Creek	6	Left	41°46′22″N 78°01′05″W (elev. 1,647 feet (502 m))	Coudersport, Pennsylvania	41°42′58″N 77°54′54″W	Summit Township, Potter County
Dingman Run	7	Right	41°45′47″N 78°02′16″W (elev. 1,627 feet (496 m))	Coudersport, Pennsylvania	41°49′54″N 78°02′47″W	Hebron Township, Potter County
Lehman Run	8	Right	41°44′28″N 78°04′43″W (elev. 1,581 feet (482 m))	Eulalia Township, Potter County	41°46′18″N 78°04′06″W	Eulalia Township, Potter County
Town Run	9	Right	41°44′38″N 78°05′22″W (elev. 1,578 feet (481 m))	Eulalia Township, Potter County	41°46′54″N 78°04′50″W	Eulalia Township, Potter County
Reed Run	10	Left	41°45′04″N 78°06′27″W (elev. 1,565 feet (477 m))	Roulette Township, Potter County	41°42′40″N 78°08′45″W	Keating Township, Potter County
Sherwood Run	11	Right	41°45′20″N 78°06′32″W (elev. 1,572 feet (479 m))	Roulette Township, Potter County	41°46′14″N 78°05′38″W	Roulette Township, Potter County
Trout Brook	12	Right	41°46′21″N 78°07′55″W (elev. 1,539 feet (469 m))	Roulette Township, Potter County	41°47′43″N 78°05′03″W	Eulalia Township, Potter County
Laninger Creek	13	Left	41°46′39″N 78°09′09″W (elev. 1,526 feet (465 m))	Roulette Township, Potter County	41°44′24″N 78°10′37″W	Roulette Township, Potter County
Fishing Creek	14	Right	41°46′50″N 78°09′54″W (elev. 1,519 feet (463 m))	Roulette Township, Potter County	41°51′19″N 78°04′38″W	Hebron Township, Potter County
Card Creek	15	Left	41°47′22″N 78°11′14″W (elev. 1,509 feet (460 m))	Roulette Township, Potter County	41°44′27″N 78°11′05″W	Roulette Township, Potter County
Sartwell Creek	16	Right	41°47′16″N 78°12′27″W (elev. 1,496 feet (456 m))	Liberty Township, McKean County	41°52′57″N 78°11′54″W	Pleasant Valley Township, Potter County
Coleman Creek	17	Right	41°47′14″N 78°14′35″W (elev. 1,480 feet (450 m))	Liberty Township, McKean County	41°49′40″N 78°12′49″W	Liberty Township, McKean County
Allegheny Portage Creek	18	Left	41°48′18″N 78°16′46″W (elev. 1,467 feet (447 m))	Liberty Township, McKean County	41°41′40″N 78°08′57″W	Keating Township, Potter County
Lillibridge Creek	19	Right	41°48′27″N 78°16′56″W (elev. 1,463 feet (446 m))	Port Allegany, Pennsylvania	41°52′29″N 78°12′52″W	Liberty Township, McKean County
Twomile Creek	20	Right	41°49′48″N 78°17′54″W (elev. 1,457 feet (444 m))	Liberty Township, McKean County	41°53′14″N 78°13′04″W	Annin Township, McKean County
Simpson Cove	21		41°51′43″N 78°20′28″W (elev. 1,440 feet (440 m))	Annin Township, McKean County		
Annin Creek	22	Right	41°52′07″N 78°20′43″W (elev. 1,437 feet (438 m))	Annin Township, McKean County	41°53′43″N 78°13′31″W	Annin Township, McKean County
Rock Run	23	Right	41°52′34″N 78°21′32″W (elev. 1,440 feet (440 m))	Annin Township, McKean County	41°55′22″N 78°15′55″W	Annin Township, McKean County
Open Brook	24	Left	41°52′41″N 78°21′55″W (elev. 1,434 feet (437 m))	Annin Township, McKean County	41°48′42″N 78°21′56″W	Liberty Township, McKean County
Newell Creek	25	Right	41°53′44″N 78°22′23″W (elev. 1,437 feet (438 m))	Eldred Township, McKean County	41°56′12″N 78°16′52″W	Ceres Township, McKean County
Potato Creek	26	Left	41°53′24″N 78°22′37″W (elev. 1,430 feet (440 m))	Eldred Township, McKean County	41°39′13″N 78°21′46″W	Norwich Township, McKean County
Fowler Brook	27	Left	41°56′02″N 78°22′57″W (elev. 1,424 feet (434 m))	Eldred Township, McKean County	41°55′00″N 78°25′15″W	Eldred Township, McKean County
Carpenter Creek	28	Right	41°56′13″N 78°22′46″W (elev. 1,427 feet (435 m))	Eldred Township, McKean County	41°55′47″N 78°20′30″W	Annin Township, McKean County
Canfield Creek	29	Right	41°56′29″N 78°22′47″W (elev. 1,427 feet (435 m))	Eldred Township, McKean County	41°56′18″N 78°20′18″W	Ceres Township, McKean County
Barden Brook	30	Right	41°57′44″N 78°23′17″W (elev. 1,427 feet (435 m))	Eldred, Pennsylvania	41°57′16″N 78°17′52″W	Ceres Township, McKean County
Knapp Creek	31	Left	41°57′58″N 78°23′09″W (elev. 1,424 feet (434 m))	Eldred, Pennsylvania	42°00′11″N 78°30′46″W	Allegany, New York
Indian Creek	32	Left	41°58′37″N 78°23′43″W (elev. 1,424 feet (434 m))	Eldred Township, McKean County	42°00′12″N 78°29′58″W	Allegany, New York
Mix Creek	33	Left	41°58′58″N 78°23′47″W (elev. 1,424 feet (434 m))	Eldred Township, McKean County	42°01′39″N 78°26′21″W	Olean, New York
Louds Creek	34	Left	41°59′20″N 78°22′49″W (elev. 1,427 feet (435 m))	Eldred Township, McKean County	42°01′17″N 78°23′58″W	Olean, New York
McCrea Run	35	Right	41°59′13″N 78°21′14″W (elev. 1,421 feet (433 m))	Eldred Township, McKean County	41°58′29″N 78°18′19″W	Ceres Township, McKean County
Oswayo Creek	36	Right	42°01′38″N 78°20′50″W (elev. 1,414 feet (431 m))	Portville, New York	41°53′27″N 77°55′48″W	Allegany Township, Potter County
Dodge Creek	37	Right	42°02′07″N 78°20′37″W (elev. 1,407 feet (429 m))	Portville, New York	42°10′02″N 78°12′32″W	Clarksville, Allegany County, New York
Lillibridge Creek	38	Right	42°02′29″N 78°20′49″W (elev. 1,401 feet (427 m))	Portville, New York	42°05′19″N 78°19′23″W	Portville, New York
Wayman Branch	39	Left	42°03′06″N 78°21′38″W (elev. 1,421 feet (433 m))	Portville, New York	42°01′49″N 78°26′29″W	Olean, New York
Stephens Lake	40		42°04′00″N 78°21′53″W (elev. 1,453 feet (443 m))	Portville, New York		
Haskell Creek	41	Right	42°03′55″N 78°23′31″W (elev. 1,404 feet (428 m))	Olean, New York	42°09′34″N 78°16′01″W	Clarksville, Allegany County, New York
Kings Brook	42	Right	42°04′10″N 78°24′48″W (elev. 1,414 feet (431 m))	Olean, New York	42°06′25″N 78°23′41″W	Olean, New York
Olean Creek	43	Right	42°04′32″N 78°25′22″W (elev. 1,401 feet (427 m))	Olean, New York	42°10′10″N 78°23′19″W	Hinsdale, New York
Twomile Creek	44	Left	42°04′00″N 78°28′29″W (elev. 1,404 feet (428 m))	Allegany, New York	42°01′35″N 78°27′09″W	Olean, New York
Twomile Creek	45	Right	42°04′18″N 78°28′52″W (elev. 1,404 feet (428 m))	Allegany, New York	42°07′05″N 78°28′01″W	Allegany, New York
Fourmile Creek	46	Left	42°04′42″N 78°29′28″W (elev. 1,401 feet (427 m))	Allegany, New York	42°00′38″N 78°30′55″W	Allegany, New York
Fivemile Creek	47	Right	42°05′35″N 78°30′22″W (elev. 1,401 feet (427 m))	Allegany, New York	42°10′43″N 78°29′59″W	Humphrey, New York
Birch Run	48	Left	42°05′30″N 78°34′29″W (elev. 1,394 feet (425 m))	Allegany Reservation, New York	42°03′36″N 78°32′48″W	Allegany, New York
Ninemile Creek	49	Right	42°05′25″N 78°34′43″W (elev. 1,381 feet (421 m))	Allegany Reservation, New York	42°10′09″N 78°32′12″W	Allegany, New York
Tenmile Creek	50	Right	42°05′39″N 78°36′02″W (elev. 1,378 feet (420 m))	Allegany Reservation, New York	42°08′16″N 78°35′22″W	Great Valley, New York
Chipmunk Creek	51	Left	42°05′06″N 78°37′13″W (elev. 1,371 feet (418 m))	Allegany Reservation, New York	42°00′27″N 78°31′29″W	Allegany, New York
Tunungwant Creek	52	Left	42°05′01″N 78°39′00″W (elev. 1,375 feet (419 m))	Allegany Reservation, New York	41°57′29″N 78°38′29″W	Bradford, Pennsylvania
Carrollton Run	53	Left	42°05′55″N 78°39′29″W (elev. 1,378 feet (420 m))	Allegany Reservation, New York	42°05′09″N 78°41′39″W	Carrollton, New York
Leonard Run	54	Left	42°06′16″N 78°39′41″W (elev. 1,378 feet (420 m))	Allegany Reservation, New York	42°07′07″N 78°41′24″W	Carrollton, New York
Windfall Creek	55	Right	42°07′18″N 78°39′49″W (elev. 1,365 feet (416 m))	Allegany Reservation, New York	42°08′37″N 78°35′33″W	Great Valley, New York
Great Valley Creek	56	Right	42°09′05″N 78°41′29″W (elev. 1,358 feet (414 m))	Salamanca, New York	42°19′13″N 78°36′23″W	Ellicottville, New York
Titus Run	57	Left	42°09′39″N 78°43′40″W (elev. 1,362 feet (415 m))	Salamanca, New York	42°07′40″N 78°42′11″W	Red House, New York
Newton Run	58	Right	42°09′51″N 78°43′45″W (elev. 1,362 feet (415 m))	Salamanca, New York	42°11′43″N 78°42′56″W	Salamanca, New York
Little Valley Creek	59	Right	42°09′50″N 78°44′33″W (elev. 1,348 feet (411 m))	Salamanca, New York	42°14′36″N 78°51′28″W	Napoli, New York
Bucktooth Run	60	Right	42°09′42″N 78°46′20″W (elev. 1,352 feet (412 m))	Allegany Reservation, New York	42°10′46″N 78°47′02″W	Salamanca, New York
Bucktooth Rapids	61		42°09′36″N 78°46′21″W (elev. 1,352 feet (412 m))	Allegany Reservation, New York		
Sawmill Run	62	Right	42°08′36″N 78°47′24″W (elev. 1,348 feet (411 m))	Allegany Reservation, New York	42°11′01″N 78°50′57″W	Napoli, New York
Breeds Run	63	Left	42°08′28″N 78°46′38″W (elev. 1,348 feet (411 m))	Allegany Reservation, New York	42°08′14″N 78°44′23″W	Salamanca, New York
Sunfish Run	64	Right	42°07′19″N 78°47′39″W (elev. 1,342 feet (409 m))	Allegany Reservation, New York	42°09′14″N 78°51′44″W	Coldspring, New York
Meetinghouse Run	65	Right	42°06′40″N 78°48′59″W (elev. 1,335 feet (407 m))	Allegany Reservation, New York	42°07′51″N 78°50′12″W	Coldspring, New York
Red House Brook	66	Left	42°06′16″N 78°49′16″W (elev. 1,339 feet (408 m))	Allegany Reservation, New York	42°00′26″N 78°43′39″W	Red House, New York
Robinson Run	67	Right	42°06′22″N 78°51′20″W (elev. 1,316 feet (401 m))	Allegany Reservation, New York	42°08′07″N 78°52′04″W	Coldspring, New York
Cricks Run	68	Left	42°05′45″N 78°51′48″W (elev. 1,316 feet (401 m))	Allegany Reservation, New York	42°04′03″N 78°50′38″W	Coldspring, New York
Cold Spring Creek	69	Right	42°05′37″N 78°52′00″W (elev. 1,316 feet (401 m))	Allegany Reservation, New York	42°15′59″N 78°53′34″W	New Albion, New York
Pine Creek	70	Left	42°04′55″N 78°52′38″W (elev. 1,325 feet (404 m))	Allegany Reservation, New York	42°04′40″N 78°51′22″W	Coldspring, New York
Quaker Run	71	Left	42°03′23″N 78°53′44″W (elev. 1,296 feet (395 m))	Allegany Reservation, New York	41°59′55″N 78°43′45″W	Red House, New York
Wolf Run	72	Left	42°02′17″N 78°53′37″W (elev. 1,319 feet (402 m))	Allegany Reservation, New York	41°59′22″N 78°50′24″W	Corydon Township, McKean County
Hotchkiss Run	73	Right	42°02′36″N 78°55′25″W (elev. 1,289 feet (393 m))	Allegany Reservation, New York	42°05′52″N 78°58′52″W	Randolph, New York
Pierce Run	74	Right	42°02′36″N 78°55′42″W (elev. 1,289 feet (393 m))	Allegany Reservation, New York	42°06′01″N 78°59′40″W	Randolph, New York
Bone Run	75	Right	42°01′50″N 78°56′37″W (elev. 1,283 feet (391 m))	Allegany Reservation, New York	42°03′48″N 79°02′57″W	South Valley, New York
Peters Creek	76	Left	42°01′44″N 78°56′45″W (elev. 1,280 feet (390 m))	Allegany Reservation, New York	42°00′47″N 78°55′00″W	South Valley, New York
Sawmill Run	77	Right	42°01′28″N 78°57′29″W (elev. 1,329 feet (405 m))	Allegany Reservation, New York	42°02′01″N 78°59′47″W	South Valley, New York
State Line Run	78	Right	42°00′03″N 78°58′39″W (elev. 1,325 feet (404 m))	South Valley, New York	41°59′51″N 79°02′54″W	Elk Township, Warren County
Fishburn Run	79	Right	41°59′55″N 78°58′12″W (elev. 1,329 feet (405 m))	Elk Township, Warren County	41°58′24″N 78°59′37″W	Elk Township, Warren County
Willow Creek	80	Left	41°59′36″N 78°56′20″W (elev. 1,325 feet (404 m))	Mead Township, Warren County	41°58′22″N 78°46′01″W	Foster Township, McKean County
Carr Brook	81	Right	41°58′38″N 78°56′46″W (elev. 1,325 feet (404 m))	Elk Township, Warren County	41°58′48″N 78°58′12″W	Elk Township, Warren County
Williams Brook	82	Left	41°58′19″N 78°55′39″W (elev. 1,339 feet (408 m))	Mead Township, Warren County	41°58′28″N 78°54′21″W	Corydon Township, McKean County
Hooks Brook	83	Right	41°57′43″N 78°56′25″W (elev. 1,325 feet (404 m))	Elk Township, Warren County	41°57′51″N 78°59′22″W	Elk Township, Warren County
Tracy Run	84	Left	41°57′35″N 78°55′37″W (elev. 1,325 feet (404 m))	Mead Township, Warren County	41°56′42″N 78°52′56″W	Corydon Township, McKean County
Allegheny Reservoir	85		41°57′10″N 78°55′42″W (elev. 1,325 feet (404 m))	Mead Township, Warren County		
Cornplanter Run	86	Right	41°56′44″N 78°56′12″W (elev. 1,325 feet (404 m))	Elk Township, Warren County	41°56′35″N 79°00′44″W	Elk Township, Warren County
Whisky Run	87	Left	41°56′12″N 78°55′31″W (elev. 1,365 feet (416 m))	Mead Township, Warren County	41°56′41″N 78°54′35″W	Corydon Township, McKean County
Johnnycake Run	88	Left	41°55′50″N 78°55′35″W (elev. 1,325 feet (404 m))	Mead Township, Warren County	41°56′24″N 78°53′31″W	Corydon Township, McKean County
Hodge Run	89	Right	41°54′08″N 78°56′51″W (elev. 1,325 feet (404 m))	Elk Township, Warren County	41°54′32″N 79°01′53″W	Elk Township, Warren County
Sugar Run	90	Left	41°53′39″N 78°56′24″W (elev. 1,325 feet (404 m))	Mead Township, Warren County	41°53′00″N 78°45′35″W	Bradford Township, McKean County
Billies Run	91	Right	41°52′37″N 78°57′51″W (elev. 1,325 feet (404 m))	Glade Township, Warren County	41°52′46″N 79°00′16″W	Glade Township, Warren County
Rock Run	92	Left	41°51′26″N 78°56′39″W (elev. 1,378 feet (420 m))	Mead Township, Warren County	41°51′54″N 78°56′01″W	Mead Township, Warren County
Wolf Run	93	Left	41°51′20″N 78°56′37″W (elev. 1,368 feet (417 m))	Mead Township, Warren County	41°51′36″N 78°54′39″W	Corydon Township, McKean County
Kinzua Creek	94	Left	41°51′29″N 78°57′36″W (elev. 1,325 feet (404 m))	Mead Township, Warren County	41°50′08″N 78°35′13″W	Keating Township, McKean County
Jackson Run	95	Right	41°51′46″N 78°58′53″W (elev. 1,329 feet (405 m))	Glade Township, Warren County	41°52′14″N 78°59′54″W	Glade Township, Warren County
Jakes Run	96	Left	41°51′18″N 78°58′31″W (elev. 1,365 feet (416 m))	Mead Township, Warren County	41°50′46″N 78°58′45″W	Mead Township, Warren County
Tuttle Run	97	Left	41°50′27″N 78°59′19″W (elev. 1,355 feet (413 m))	Mead Township, Warren County	41°50′07″N 78°58′47″W	Mead Township, Warren County
Bent Run	98	Left	41°50′09″N 78°59′51″W (elev. 1,339 feet (408 m))	Mead Township, Warren County	41°49′15″N 78°59′15″W	Mead Township, Warren County
Kinzua Dam	99		41°50′17″N 79°00′15″W (elev. 1,273 feet (388 m))	Mead Township, Warren County		
Hemlock Run	100	Right	41°50′50″N 79°03′30″W (elev. 1,194 feet (364 m))	Glade Township, Warren County	41°54′11″N 79°02′45″W	Elk Township, Warren County
Anderson Run	101	Left	41°50′27″N 79°04′13″W (elev. 1,191 feet (363 m))	Mead Township, Warren County	41°50′25″N 79°02′30″W	Mead Township, Warren County
Ward Run	102	Left	41°50′07″N 79°04′27″W (elev. 1,188 feet (362 m))	Mead Township, Warren County	41°50′00″N 79°02′53″W	Mead Township, Warren County
Browns Run	103	Left	41°49′22″N 79°06′44″W (elev. 1,181 feet (360 m))	Mead Township, Warren County	41°48′27″N 78°59′10″W	Mead Township, Warren County
Glade Run	104	Right	41°49′36″N 79°07′25″W (elev. 1,188 feet (362 m))	Mead Township, Warren County	41°51′48″N 79°04′30″W	Glade Township, Warren County
Ott Run	105		41°49′39″N 79°07′39″W (elev. 1,181 feet (360 m))	Mead Township, Warren County	41°48′42″N 79°09′46″W	Pleasant Township, Warren County
Conewango Creek	106		41°50′28″N 79°08′43″W (elev. 1,181 feet (360 m))	Warren, Pennsylvania	42°16′51″N 78°51′25″W	New Albion, New York
Sill Run	107		41°49′52″N 79°11′25″W (elev. 1,168 feet (356 m))	Pleasant Township, Warren County	41°47′59″N 79°12′11″W	Pleasant Township, Warren County
Morse Run	108		41°50′19″N 79°12′56″W (elev. 1,158 feet (353 m))	Conewango Township, Warren County	41°53′18″N 79°14′36″W	Conewango Township, Warren County
Grunder Run	109		41°50′19″N 79°13′16″W (elev. 1,158 feet (353 m))	Pleasant Township, Warren County	41°47′51″N 79°13′16″W	Pleasant Township, Warren County
Scott Run	110		41°50′47″N 79°14′30″W (elev. 1,152 feet (351 m))	Conewango Township, Warren County	41°52′53″N 79°15′03″W	Conewango Township, Warren County
Brokenstraw Creek	111		41°50′08″N 79°15′34″W (elev. 1,152 feet (351 m))	Brokenstraw Township, Warren County	42°02′35″N 79°30′09″W	Harmony, New York
Lenhart Run	112		41°49′42″N 79°15′43″W (elev. 1,155 feet (352 m))	Pleasant Township, Warren County	41°48′31″N 79°14′52″W	Pleasant Township, Warren County
Dunn Run	113		41°48′20″N 79°16′53″W (elev. 1,138 feet (347 m))	Brokenstraw Township, Warren County	41°47′32″N 79°21′51″W	Brokenstraw Township, Warren County
Charley Run	114		41°48′13″N 79°16′47″W (elev. 1,138 feet (347 m))	Pleasant Township, Warren County	41°47′57″N 79°14′34″W	Pleasant Township, Warren County
Hedgehog Run	115		41°47′03″N 79°17′01″W (elev. 1,138 feet (347 m))	Pleasant Township, Warren County	41°47′33″N 79°14′10″W	Pleasant Township, Warren County
Clark Run	116		41°45′32″N 79°17′26″W (elev. 1,125 feet (343 m))	Watson Township, Warren County	41°45′19″N 79°15′38″W	Watson Township, Warren County
Dry Run	117		41°45′35″N 79°17′38″W (elev. 1,125 feet (343 m))	Deerfield Township, Warren County	41°46′07″N 79°18′29″W	Deerfield Township, Warren County
Thompson Run	118		41°45′14″N 79°18′02″W (elev. 1,125 feet (343 m))	Deerfield Township, Warren County	41°47′13″N 79°21′40″W	Deerfield Township, Warren County
Slater Run	119		41°44′56″N 79°18′32″W (elev. 1,125 feet (343 m))	Watson Township, Warren County	41°44′04″N 79°15′33″W	Watson Township, Warren County
Little Run	120		41°44′51″N 79°18′52″W (elev. 1,125 feet (343 m))	Watson Township, Warren County	41°45′52″N 79°20′03″W	Deerfield Township, Warren County
Conklin Run	121		41°44′24″N 79°19′15″W (elev. 1,122 feet (342 m))	Deerfield Township, Warren County	41°46′09″N 79°21′47″W	Deerfield Township, Warren County
Station Run	122		41°43′38″N 79°19′45″W (elev. 1,115 feet (340 m))	Deerfield Township, Warren County	41°44′17″N 79°20′30″W	Deerfield Township, Warren County
Connelly Run	123		41°43′22″N 79°20′04″W (elev. 1,115 feet (340 m))	Deerfield Township, Warren County	41°45′36″N 79°22′50″W	Deerfield Township, Warren County
Hague Run	124		41°42′55″N 79°20′44″W (elev. 1,112 feet (339 m))	Deerfield Township, Warren County	41°43′45″N 79°21′20″W	Deerfield Township, Warren County
Alex Magee Run	125		41°42′27″N 79°21′02″W (elev. 1,109 feet (338 m))	Deerfield Township, Warren County	41°42′13″N 79°19′53″W	Limestone Township, Warren County
Perry Magee Run	126		41°42′17″N 79°21′09″W (elev. 1,109 feet (338 m))	Deerfield Township, Warren County	41°45′53″N 79°24′23″W	Deerfield Township, Warren County
Waid Run	127		41°41′33″N 79°21′29″W (elev. 1,119 feet (341 m))	Limestone Township, Warren County	41°41′25″N 79°20′08″W	Limestone Township, Warren County
Snow Run	128		41°41′32″N 79°21′42″W (elev. 1,102 feet (336 m))	Deerfield Township, Warren County	41°42′35″N 79°23′00″W	Deerfield Township, Warren County
Baugher Run	129		41°41′02″N 79°22′10″W (elev. 1,102 feet (336 m))	Limestone Township, Warren County	41°40′10″N 79°22′16″W	Limestone Township, Warren County
Potter Run	130		41°41′00″N 79°22′46″W (elev. 1,115 feet (340 m))	Deerfield Township, Warren County	41°41′53″N 79°22′59″W	Deerfield Township, Warren County
McGuire Run	131		41°40′56″N 79°24′19″W (elev. 1,096 feet (334 m))	Tidioute, Pennsylvania	41°44′57″N 79°24′35″W	Deerfield Township, Warren County
Tidioute Creek	132		41°40′54″N 79°24′33″W (elev. 1,096 feet (334 m))	Tidioute, Pennsylvania	41°46′16″N 79°26′18″W	Pittsfield Township, Warren County
Gordon Run	133		41°40′45″N 79°25′16″W (elev. 1,102 feet (336 m))	Triumph Township, Warren County	41°40′02″N 79°28′39″W	Triumph Township, Warren County
Myers Run	134		41°40′02″N 79°25′03″W (elev. 1,096 feet (334 m))	Limestone Township, Warren County	41°40′12″N 79°23′52″W	Limestone Township, Warren County
Grove Run	135		41°39′37″N 79°24′59″W (elev. 1,089 feet (332 m))	Triumph Township, Warren County	41°39′48″N 79°26′06″W	Triumph Township, Warren County
Dale Run	136		41°38′50″N 79°24′24″W (elev. 1,086 feet (331 m))	Limestone Township, Warren County	41°40′19″N 79°23′15″W	Limestone Township, Warren County
Dunn Run	137		41°37′59″N 79°24′11″W (elev. 1,079 feet (329 m))	Limestone Township, Warren County	41°39′39″N 79°22′35″W	Limestone Township, Warren County
Schwab Run	138		41°37′10″N 79°23′56″W (elev. 1,083 feet (330 m))	Hickory Township, Forest County	41°37′29″N 79°22′37″W	Hickory Township, Forest County
Jones Run	139		41°37′00″N 79°24′04″W (elev. 1,076 feet (328 m))	Harmony Township, Forest County	41°38′25″N 79°25′24″W	Triumph Township, Warren County
East Hickory Creek	140		41°34′47″N 79°24′23″W (elev. 1,063 feet (324 m))	Hickory Township, Forest County	41°43′08″N 79°15′26″W	Watson Township, Warren County
Siggins Run	141		41°33′46″N 79°24′47″W (elev. 1,060 feet (320 m))	Harmony Township, Forest County	41°36′06″N 79°25′19″W	Harmony Township, Forest County
Little Hickory Run	142		41°33′35″N 79°25′03″W (elev. 1,066 feet (325 m))	Hickory Township, Forest County	41°33′27″N 79°21′03″W	Hickory Township, Forest County
West Hickory Creek	143		41°33′38″N 79°25′12″W (elev. 1,060 feet (320 m))	Harmony Township, Forest County	41°40′25″N 79°27′07″W	Triumph Township, Warren County
Dawson Run	144		41°32′15″N 79°26′21″W (elev. 1,053 feet (321 m))	Harmony Township, Forest County	41°34′34″N 79°28′12″W	Harmony Township, Forest County
Sibbald Run	145		41°32′10″N 79°26′11″W (elev. 1,063 feet (324 m))	Hickory Township, Forest County	41°31′42″N 79°25′14″W	Hickory Township, Forest County
Jamison Run	146		41°30′30″N 79°27′17″W (elev. 1,047 feet (319 m))	Tionesta Township, Forest County	41°32′12″N 79°28′33″W	Harmony Township, Forest County
Tubbs Run	147		41°30′33″N 79°26′58″W (elev. 1,060 feet (320 m))	Tionesta, Pennsylvania	41°31′51″N 79°21′57″W	Green Township, Forest County
Hunter Run	148		41°29′43″N 79°27′39″W (elev. 1,037 feet (316 m))	Tionesta Township, Forest County	41°32′51″N 79°29′25″W	Harmony Township, Forest County
Tionesta Creek	149		41°29′15″N 79°27′24″W (elev. 1,050 feet (320 m))	Tionesta Township, Forest County	41°40′36″N 79°02′04″W	Sheffield Township, Warren County
Little Tionesta Creek	150		41°28′10″N 79°28′27″W (elev. 1,040 feet (320 m))	Tionesta Township, Forest County	41°24′39″N 79°23′31″W	Washington Township, Clarion County
Bates Run	151		41°28′15″N 79°29′26″W (elev. 1,033 feet (315 m))	Tionesta Township, Forest County	41°30′36″N 79°29′21″W	Tionesta Township, Forest County
Indian Camp Run	152		41°28′14″N 79°29′49″W (elev. 1,030 feet (310 m))	Tionesta Township, Forest County	41°27′10″N 79°29′12″W	Tionesta Township, Forest County
Holeman Run	153		41°28′37″N 79°30′46″W (elev. 1,037 feet (316 m))	President Township, Venango County	41°29′46″N 79°29′58″W	Tionesta Township, Forest County
Stewart Run	154		41°28′20″N 79°32′25″W (elev. 1,033 feet (315 m))	President Township, Venango County	41°33′50″N 79°29′31″W	Harmony Township, Forest County
Fox Run	155		41°28′08″N 79°32′29″W (elev. 1,043 feet (318 m))	President Township, Venango County	41°27′17″N 79°32′11″W	President Township, Venango County
Johnson Run	156		41°28′13″N 79°32′55″W (elev. 1,037 feet (316 m))	President Township, Venango County	41°29′26″N 79°33′21″W	President Township, Venango County
Hemlock Creek	157		41°27′04″N 79°33′27″W (elev. 1,024 feet (312 m))	President Township, Venango County	41°23′58″N 79°26′48″W	Tionesta Township, Forest County
McCrea Run	158		41°26′57″N 79°34′34″W (elev. 1,020 feet (310 m))	President Township, Venango County	41°25′39″N 79°35′05″W	President Township, Venango County
Culver Run	159		41°27′39″N 79°35′09″W (elev. 1,017 feet (310 m))	President Township, Venango County	41°28′34″N 79°33′56″W	President Township, Venango County
Pithole Creek	160		41°27′23″N 79°36′35″W (elev. 1,014 feet (309 m))	President Township, Venango County	41°37′20″N 79°29′38″W	Harmony Township, Forest County
Panther Run	161		41°26′25″N 79°38′12″W (elev. 1,040 feet (320 m))	Cranberry Township, Venango County	41°26′53″N 79°35′37″W	President Township, Venango County
Lamb Run	162		41°26′08″N 79°39′20″W (elev. 991 feet (302 m))	Cornplanter Township, Venango County	41°27′39″N 79°40′02″W	Cornplanter Township, Venango County
Horse Creek	163		41°25′55″N 79°39′36″W (elev. 1,014 feet (309 m))	Cranberry Township, Venango County	41°25′10″N 79°35′36″W	President Township, Venango County
Carney Run	164		41°25′55″N 79°39′54″W (elev. 991 feet (302 m))	Cornplanter Township, Venango County	41°26′32″N 79°41′00″W	Cornplanter Township, Venango County
Sage Run	165		41°25′24″N 79°41′56″W (elev. 981 feet (299 m))	Oil City, Pennsylvania	41°22′50″N 79°41′19″W	Cranberry Township, Venango County
Oil Creek	166		41°25′54″N 79°42′33″W (elev. 981 feet (299 m))	Oil City, Pennsylvania	41°48′30″N 79°50′31″W	Bloomfield Township, Crawford County
Holiday Run	167		41°26′19″N 79°42′51″W (elev. 1,194 feet (364 m))	Oil City, Pennsylvania	41°26′53″N 79°43′36″W	Cornplanter Township, Venango County
Charley Run	168		41°25′35″N 79°43′32″W (elev. 974 feet (297 m))	Oil City, Pennsylvania	41°27′12″N 79°44′26″W	Sugarcreek, Pennsylvania
Brannon Run	169		41°24′42″N 79°45′23″W (elev. 991 feet (302 m))	Sugarcreek, Pennsylvania	41°26′48″N 79°44′42″W	Sugarcreek, Pennsylvania
Seneca Run	170		41°24′34″N 79°47′11″W (elev. 974 feet (297 m))	Cranberry Township, Venango County	41°23′34″N 79°45′26″W	Cranberry Township, Venango County
Twomile Run	171		41°24′30″N 79°47′30″W (elev. 965 feet (294 m))	Sugarcreek, Pennsylvania	41°31′30″N 79°45′04″W	Oakland Township, Venango County
French Creek	172		41°23′30″N 79°49′13″W (elev. 961 feet (293 m))	Sandycreek Township, Venango County	42°06′14″N 79°31′52″W	Sherman, New York
Lower Twomile Run	173		41°22′20″N 79°48′04″W (elev. 958 feet (292 m))	Cranberry Township, Venango County	41°22′18″N 79°41′20″W	Cranberry Township, Venango County
Siefer Run	174		41°21′19″N 79°47′22″W (elev. 948 feet (289 m))	Sandycreek Township, Venango County	41°21′24″N 79°48′56″W	Sandycreek Township, Venango County
Ajax Run	175		41°21′01″N 79°47′24″W (elev. 948 feet (289 m))	Sandycreek Township, Venango County	41°20′36″N 79°48′44″W	Sandycreek Township, Venango County
East Sandy Creek	176		41°19′59″N 79°46′07″W (elev. 942 feet (287 m))	Sandycreek Township, Venango County	41°21′04″N 79°26′57″W	Washington Township, Clarion County
Snyder Run	177		41°19′35″N 79°50′10″W (elev. 942 feet (287 m))	Rockland Township, Venango County	41°18′48″N 79°48′40″W	Rockland Township, Venango County
Sandy Creek	178		41°19′31″N 79°50′36″W (elev. 932 feet (284 m))	Sandycreek Township, Venango County	41°31′00″N 80°17′22″W	East Fallowfield Township, Crawford County
Clark Run	179		41°18′51″N 79°51′22″W (elev. 935 feet (285 m))	Victory Township, Venango County	41°17′55″N 79°52′49″W	Victory Township, Venango County
Pine Hill Run	180		41°17′15″N 79°49′27″W (elev. 935 feet (285 m))	Rockland Township, Venango County	41°18′54″N 79°47′03″W	Rockland Township, Venango County
Dennison Run	181		41°16′25″N 79°50′51″W (elev. 925 feet (282 m))	Clinton Township, Venango County	41°17′29″N 79°53′59″W	Victory Township, Venango County
Scrubgrass Creek	182		41°15′37″N 79°50′16″W (elev. 922 feet (281 m))	Clinton Township, Venango County	41°14′45″N 79°57′33″W	Irwin Township, Venango County
Roberts Run	183		41°16′18″N 79°47′41″W (elev. 932 feet (284 m))	Rockland Township, Venango County	41°17′45″N 79°45′12″W	Rockland Township, Venango County
Falling Spring Run	184		41°16′09″N 79°47′51″W (elev. 899 feet (274 m))	Scrubgrass Township, Venango County	41°16′03″N 79°48′39″W	Scrubgrass Township, Venango County
Whitherup Run	185		41°15′04″N 79°47′40″W (elev. 902 feet (275 m))	Rockland Township, Venango County	41°16′12″N 79°45′33″W	Rockland Township, Venango County
Perry Run	186		41°14′53″N 79°47′37″W (elev. 899 feet (274 m))	Scrubgrass Township, Venango County	41°14′01″N 79°49′20″W	Scrubgrass Township, Venango County
Whann Run	187		41°13′33″N 79°46′32″W (elev. 899 feet (274 m))	Scrubgrass Township, Venango County	41°13′05″N 79°49′22″W	Scrubgrass Township, Venango County
Little Scrubgrass Creek	188		41°13′30″N 79°46′19″W (elev. 902 feet (275 m))	Scrubgrass Township, Venango County	41°10′11″N 79°51′44″W	Venango Township, Butler County
Shull Run	189		41°13′51″N 79°45′10″W (elev. 896 feet (273 m))	Scrubgrass Township, Venango County	41°16′48″N 79°43′47″W	Rockland Township, Venango County
Mill Creek	190		41°13′29″N 79°43′24″W (elev. 902 feet (275 m))	Rockland Township, Venango County	41°15′22″N 79°36′34″W	Ashland Township, Clarion County
Richey Run	191		41°10′34″N 79°42′00″W (elev. 866 feet (264 m))	Richland Township, Clarion County	41°13′21″N 79°39′39″W	Richland Township, Venango County
Lowrey Run	192		41°10′20″N 79°41′38″W (elev. 869 feet (265 m))	Allegheny Township, Butler County	41°08′29″N 79°45′19″W	Allegheny Township, Butler County
Fowler Run	193		41°08′25″N 79°40′57″W (elev. 860 feet (260 m))	Foxburg, Pennsylvania	41°08′32″N 79°44′04″W	Allegheny Township, Butler County
Clarion River	194		41°06′59″N 79°40′30″W (elev. 850 feet (260 m))	Perry Township, Clarion County	41°29′28″N 78°40′41″W	Johnsonburg, Pennsylvania
Thoms Run	195		41°06′21″N 79°40′53″W (elev. 856 feet (261 m))	Hovey Township, Armstrong County	41°07′10″N 79°42′20″W	Allegheny Township, Butler County
Bear Creek	196		41°04′58″N 79°40′25″W (elev. 840 feet (260 m))	Perry Township, Clarion County	40°57′03″N 79°47′44″W	Oakland Township, Butler County
Dunlap Creek	197		41°04′42″N 79°39′41″W (elev. 856 feet (261 m))	Perry Township, Clarion County	41°05′55″N 79°38′27″W	Perry Township, Clarion County
Black Fox Run	198		41°02′15″N 79°37′35″W (elev. 840 feet (260 m))	Perry Township, Clarion County	41°03′58″N 79°33′57″W	Toby Township, Clarion County
Birch Run	199		41°02′00″N 79°37′09″W (elev. 837 feet (255 m))	Toby Township, Clarion County	41°01′16″N 79°37′49″W	Perry Township, Armstrong County
Armstrong Run	200	Right	41°00′43″N 79°36′33″W (elev. 827 feet (252 m))	Madison Township, Clarion County	41°01′06″N 79°38′18″W	Perry Township, Armstrong County
Catfish Run	201		41°00′19″N 79°35′17″W (elev. 823 feet (251 m))	Madison Township, Clarion County	41°03′21″N 79°33′05″W	Toby Township, Clarion County
Sugar Creek	202	Right	40°59′31″N 79°36′49″W (elev. 830 feet (250 m))	Bradys Bend Township, Armstrong County	40°58′11″N 79°42′33″W	Fairview Township, Butler County
Snyders Run	203	Right	40°58′12″N 79°35′22″W (elev. 846 feet (258 m))	Bradys Bend Township, Armstrong County	40°56′28″N 79°35′48″W	Sugarcreek Township, Armstrong County
Huling Run	204	Right	40°59′01″N 79°34′32″W (elev. 823 feet (251 m))	Washington Township, Armstrong County	40°54′47″N 79°35′17″W	Sugarcreek Township, Armstrong County
Redbank Creek	205	Left	40°58′55″N 79°33′00″W (elev. 823 feet (251 m))	Madison Township, Clarion County	41°09′30″N 79°04′36″W	Brookville, Pennsylvania
Allegheny River Pool Nine	206		40°57′18″N 79°32′53″W (elev. 814 feet (248 m))	Madison Township, Armstrong County		
Allegheny River Lock and Dam Nine	207		40°57′18″N 79°32′53″W (elev. 814 feet (248 m))	Madison Township, Armstrong County		
Mast Run	208	Left	40°56′49″N 79°32′39″W (elev. 817 feet (249 m))	Madison Township, Armstrong County	40°57′47″N 79°31′07″W	Madison Township, Armstrong County
Mahoning Creek	209		40°55′59″N 79°27′40″W (elev. 801 feet (244 m))	Pine Township, Armstrong County	40°58′26″N 78°51′22″W	Henderson Township, Jefferson County
Wiskey Creek	210		40°55′12″N 79°27′48″W (elev. 814 feet (248 m))	Pine Township, Armstrong County	40°55′06″N 79°26′06″W	Pine Township, Armstrong County
Allegheny River Pool Eight	211		40°53′42″N 79°28′41″W (elev. 787 feet (240 m))	Boggs Township, Armstrong County		
Allegheny River Lock and Dam Eight	212		40°53′42″N 79°28′41″W (elev. 787 feet (240 m))	Boggs Township, Armstrong County		
Pine Creek	213	Right	40°52′16″N 79°28′41″W (elev. 801 feet (244 m))	Rayburn Township, Armstrong County	40°52′27″N 79°28′08″W	Rayburn Township, Armstrong County
Hays Run	214	Right	40°51′44″N 79°28′59″W (elev. 807 feet (246 m))	Rayburn Township, Armstrong County	40°50′29″N 79°26′33″W	Valley Township, Armstrong County
Limestone Run	215	Right	40°51′21″N 79°30′28″W (elev. 791 feet (241 m))	East Franklin Township, Armstrong County	40°54′58″N 79°33′10″W	Washington Township, Armstrong County
Cowanshannock Creek	216	Left	40°51′04″N 79°30′28″W (elev. 787 feet (240 m))	Rayburn Township, Armstrong County	40°49′34″N 79°10′32″W	South Mahoning Township, Indiana County
Lock Number Seven	217		40°49′08″N 79°31′46″W (elev. 774 feet (236 m))	East Franklin Township, Armstrong County		
Allegheny River Pool Seven	218		40°49′06″N 79°31′41″W (elev. 774 feet (236 m))	Kittanning, Pennsylvania		
Allegheny River Lock and Dam Seven	219		40°49′06″N 79°31′41″W (elev. 774 feet (236 m))	Kittanning, Pennsylvania		
Garretts Run	220		40°47′40″N 79°31′02″W (elev. 801 feet (244 m))	Manor Township, Armstrong County	40°45′32″N 79°27′22″W	Kittanning Township, Armstrong County
Tub Mill Run	221	Left	40°45′23″N 79°32′50″W (elev. 768 feet (234 m))	Manor Township, Armstrong County	40°45′43″N 79°30′36″W	Manor Township, Armstrong County
Glade Run	222	Right	40°45′08″N 79°34′06″W (elev. 768 feet (234 m))	Cadogan Township, Armstrong County	40°54′17″N 79°34′24″W	Washington Township, Armstrong County
Crooked Creek	223	Left	40°44′57″N 79°33′18″W (elev. 771 feet (235 m))	Bethel Township, Armstrong County	40°41′44″N 79°04′43″W	Rayne Township, Indiana County
Nicholson Run	224	Right	40°43′34″N 79°35′13″W (elev. 768 feet (234 m))	South Buffalo Township, Armstrong County	40°47′09″N 79°36′19″W	North Buffalo Township, Armstrong County
Allegheny River Pool Six	225		40°43′00″N 79°34′47″W (elev. 768 feet (234 m))	South Buffalo Township, Armstrong County		
Allegheny River Lock and Dam Six	226		40°43′00″N 79°34′47″W (elev. 768 feet (234 m))	South Buffalo Township, Armstrong County		
Taylor Run	227		40°42′28″N 79°34′49″W (elev. 758 feet (231 m))	Bethel Township, Armstrong County	40°40′37″N 79°31′38″W	Bethel Township, Armstrong County
Watson Run	228	Right	40°42′07″N 79°36′19″W (elev. 879 feet (268 m))	South Buffalo Township, Armstrong County	40°43′24″N 79°37′22″W	South Buffalo Township, Armstrong County
Hill Run	229	Right	40°41′41″N 79°37′15″W (elev. 758 feet (231 m))	South Buffalo Township, Armstrong County	40°43′44″N 79°37′55″W	South Buffalo Township, Armstrong County
Knapp Run	230	Right	40°41′44″N 79°38′46″W (elev. 764 feet (233 m))	South Buffalo Township, Armstrong County	40°43′39″N 79°38′14″W	South Buffalo Township, Armstrong County
Allegheny River Pool Five	231		40°41′03″N 79°39′58″W (elev. 755 feet (230 m))	Gilpin Township, Armstrong County		
Allegheny River Lock and Dam Five	232		40°41′00″N 79°39′59″W (elev. 748 feet (228 m))	Gilpin Township, Armstrong County		
Big Run	233		40°40′52″N 79°40′11″W (elev. 751 feet (229 m))	South Buffalo Township, Armstrong County	40°43′25″N 79°39′18″W	South Buffalo Township, Armstrong County
Kiskiminetas River	234	Left	40°40′46″N 79°40′01″W (elev. 745 feet (227 m))	Allegheny Township, Westmoreland County	40°29′08″N 79°27′14″W	Saltsburg, Pennsylvania
Buffalo Creek	235	Right	40°40′11″N 79°41′34″W (elev. 745 feet (227 m))	Freeport, Pennsylvania	40°56′46″N 79°47′19″W	Oakland Township, Butler County
Rachel Carson Run	236		40°38′56″N 79°41′28″W (elev. 748 feet (228 m))	Harrison Township, Allegheny County	40°39′32″N 79°42′15″W	Harrison Township, Allegheny County
Allegheny River Pool Four	237		40°36′54″N 79°43′00″W (elev. 748 feet (228 m))	Harrison Township, Allegheny County		
Allegheny River Lock and Dam Four	238		40°36′54″N 79°43′05″W (elev. 748 feet (228 m))	Harrison Township, Allegheny County		
Chartiers Run	239		40°36′16″N 79°43′29″W (elev. 768 feet (234 m))	Lower Burrell, Pennsylvania	40°34′32″N 79°40′29″W	Upper Burrell Township, Westmoreland County
Bull Creek	240		40°35′52″N 79°45′27″W (elev. 755 feet (230 m))	Tarentum, Pennsylvania	40°41′40″N 79°53′43″W	Middlesex Township, Butler County
Bailey Run	241		40°35′04″N 79°46′26″W (elev. 761 feet (232 m))	East Deer Township, Allegheny County	40°37′13″N 79°48′39″W	Frazer Township, Allegheny County
Crawford Run	242		40°34′52″N 79°46′30″W (elev. 755 feet (230 m))	East Deer Township, Allegheny County	40°35′57″N 79°48′36″W	Frazer Township, Allegheny County
Pucketa Creek	243		40°33′01″N 79°45′45″W (elev. 738 feet (225 m))	Plum, Pennsylvania	40°28′36″N 79°37′00″W	Washington Township, Westmoreland County
Riddle Run	244		40°32′22″N 79°46′11″W (elev. 738 feet (225 m))	Springdale, Pennsylvania	40°34′24″N 79°47′21″W	Frazer Township, Allegheny County
Tawney Run	245		40°32′13″N 79°47′36″W (elev. 751 feet (229 m))	Springdale, Pennsylvania	40°34′48″N 79°47′58″W	Frazer Township, Allegheny County
Blacks Run	246		40°32′09″N 79°48′48″W (elev. 735 feet (224 m))	Plum, Pennsylvania	40°31′47″N 79°47′26″W	Plum, Pennsylvania
Allegheny River Pool Three	247		40°32′18″N 79°48′53″W (elev. 735 feet (224 m))	Harmar Township, Allegheny County		
C. W. Bill Young Lock and Dam	248		40°32′18″N 79°48′55″W (elev. 732 feet (223 m))	Harmar Township, Allegheny County		
Deer Creek	249		40°32′07″N 79°50′22″W (elev. 725 feet (221 m))	Harmar Township, Allegheny County	40°41′04″N 79°54′09″W	Middlesex Township, Butler County
Falling Springs Run	250		40°31′50″N 79°50′11″W (elev. 778 feet (237 m))	Plum, Pennsylvania	40°31′42″N 79°49′40″W	Plum, Pennsylvania
Guys Run	251		40°32′06″N 79°50′51″W (elev. 725 feet (221 m))	Harmar Township, Allegheny County	40°33′21″N 79°52′05″W	Harmar Township, Allegheny County
Plum Creek	252		40°30′27″N 79°50′50″W (elev. 728 feet (222 m))	Verona, Pennsylvania	40°28′22″N 79°44′56″W	Plum, Pennsylvania
Powers Run	253		40°30′23″N 79°51′04″W (elev. 741 feet (226 m))	O'Hara Township, Allegheny County	40°31′27″N 79°51′45″W	O'Hara Township, Allegheny County
Indian Creek	254		40°30′12″N 79°50′48″W (elev. 725 feet (221 m))	Verona, Pennsylvania	40°29′51″N 79°49′33″W	Penn Hills Township, Allegheny County
Quigley Creek	255		40°29′29″N 79°50′57″W (elev. 728 feet (222 m))	Penn Hills Township, Allegheny County	40°29′14″N 79°50′24″W	Penn Hills Township, Allegheny County
Sandy Creek	256		40°29′09″N 79°51′28″W (elev. 725 feet (221 m))	Penn Hills Township, Allegheny County	40°27′43″N 79°51′55″W	Penn Hills Township, Allegheny County
Squaw Run	257		40°29′04″N 79°52′38″W (elev. 725 feet (221 m))	O'Hara Township, Allegheny County	40°33′19″N 79°53′07″W	Indiana Township, Allegheny County
Shades Run	258		40°28′57″N 79°53′03″W (elev. 784 feet (239 m))	Pittsburgh, Pennsylvania	40°28′10″N 79°52′39″W	Penn Hills Township, Allegheny County
Allegheny River Pool Two	259		40°29′21″N 79°54′48″W (elev. 722 feet (220 m))	O'Hara Township, Allegheny County		
Allegheny River Lock and Dam Two	260		40°29′16″N 79°54′55″W (elev. 712 feet (217 m))	Pittsburgh, Pennsylvania		
Guyasuta Run	261	Right	40°29′29″N 79°54′49″W (elev. 722 feet (220 m))	O'Hara Township, Allegheny County	40°31′07″N 79°55′04″W	O'Hara Township, Allegheny County
Pine Creek	262		40°29′21″N 79°57′04″W (elev. 712 feet (217 m))	Etna, Pennsylvania	40°38′21″N 80°04′21″W	Bradford Woods, Pennsylvania
Girtys Run	263	Right	40°28′42″N 79°58′07″W (elev. 735 feet (224 m))	Millvale, Pennsylvania	40°33′59″N 80°02′09″W	McCandless Township, Allegheny County

== Red House Brook ==
Tributaries of Red House Brook
Name	Number	Bank	Mouth	Political subdivision	Source	Political subdivision
Bay State Brook	1	Left	42°06′14″N 78°48′48″W (elev. 1,329 feet (405 m))	Allegany Indian Reservation	42°03′08″N 78°46′16″W	Red House, New York
Red House Lake	2		42°06′10″N 78°44′41″W (elev. 1,411 feet (430 m))	Red House, New York		
Stoddard Creek	3	Left	42°05′58″N 78°44′50″W (elev. 1,411 feet (430 m))	Red House, New York	42°03′25″N 78°45′50″W	Red House, New York
McIntosh Creek	4	Right	42°06′21″N 78°44′40″W (elev. 1,411 feet (430 m))	Red House, New York	42°07′35″N 78°42′26″W	Red House, New York
Beehunter Creek	5	Left	42°05′57″N 78°44′18″W (elev. 1,411 feet (430 m))	Red House, New York	42°03′45″N 78°44′18″W	Red House, New York
Bova Creek	6	Right	42°05′53″N 78°43′26″W (elev. 1,444 feet (440 m))	Red House, New York	42°07′22″N 78°42′04″W	Red House, New York
France Brook	7	Left	42°03′06″N 78°43′09″W (elev. 1,650 feet (500 m))	Red House, New York	42°03′13″N 78°45′49″W	Red House, New York

== East Sandy Creek ==
Tributaries of East Sandy Creek
Name	Number	Bank	Mouth	Political subdivision	Source	Political subdivision
Richland Run	1	Right	41°19′39″N 79°28′51″W (elev. 1,421 feet (433 m))	Elk Township, Clarion County	41°21′10″N 79°27′39″W	Washington Township, Clarion County
Prairie Run	2	Right	41°19′54″N 79°33′48″W (elev. 1,260 feet (380 m))	Pinegrove Township, Venango County	41°22′23″N 79°30′52″W	Pinegrove Township, Venango County
Cogley Run	3	Left	41°19′34″N 79°34′30″W (elev. 1,240 feet (380 m))	Pinegrove Township, Venango County	41°18′02″N 79°32′05″W	Ashland Township, Clarion County
Little East Sandy Creek	4	Left	41°18′59″N 79°37′21″W (elev. 1,204 feet (367 m))	Cranberry Township, Venango County	41°17′37″N 79°31′57″W	Ashland Township, Clarion County
Tarkiln Run	5	Right	41°19′01″N 79°38′55″W (elev. 1,184 feet (361 m))	Cranberry Township, Venango County	41°22′26″N 79°34′34″W	Pinegrove Township, Venango County
Pine Run	6	Left	41°18′00″N 79°41′14″W (elev. 1,138 feet (347 m))	Rockland Township, Venango County	41°15′42″N 79°35′54″W	Ashland Township, Clarion County
Shaw Run	7	Left	41°18′19″N 79°42′22″W (elev. 1,106 feet (337 m))	Rockland Township, Venango County	41°16′23″N 79°42′59″W	Rockland Township, Venango County
Shannon Run	8	Left	41°18′31″N 79°42′33″W (elev. 1,125 feet (343 m))	Cranberry Township, Venango County	41°17′58″N 79°43′13″W	Rockland Township, Venango County
Pryor Run	9	Right	41°18′44″N 79°42′32″W (elev. 1,152 feet (351 m))	Cranberry Township, Venango County	41°19′00″N 79°41′53″W	Cranberry Township, Venango County
Halls Run	10	Right	41°19′10″N 79°42′50″W (elev. 1,089 feet (332 m))	Cranberry Township, Venango County	41°23′07″N 79°37′37″W	Cranberry Township, Venango County
Browns Run	11	Left	41°18′49″N 79°43′22″W (elev. 1,093 feet (333 m))	Rockland Township, Venango County	41°17′12″N 79°44′32″W	Rockland Township, Venango County
Porcupine Run	12	Left	41°19′23″N 79°45′11″W (elev. 974 feet (297 m))	Rockland Township, Venango County	41°17′56″N 79°45′35″W	Rockland Township, Venango County
Burford Run	13	Right	41°19′57″N 79°45′24″W (elev. 974 feet (297 m))	Cranberry Township, Venango County	41°21′16″N 79°44′57″W	Cranberry Township, Venango County

== Clarion River ==
Tributaries of the Clarion River
Name	Number	Bank	Mouth	Political subdivision	Source	Political subdivision
West Branch Clarion River	1	Right	41°29′29″N 78°40′42″W (elev. 1,437 feet (438 m))	Johnsonburg, Pennsylvania	41°43′08″N 78°38′48″W	Mount Jewett, Pennsylvania
East Branch Clarion River	2	Left	41°29′29″N 78°40′41″W (elev. 1,440 feet (440 m))	Johnsonburg, Pennsylvania	41°40′33″N 78°29′07″W	Sergeant Township, McKean County
Johnson Run	3	Right	41°29′20″N 78°40′42″W (elev. 1,437 feet (438 m))	Johnsonburg, Pennsylvania	41°30′00″N 78°42′25″W	Ridgway Township, Elk County
Powers Run	4	Left	41°28′46″N 78°40′19″W (elev. 1,424 feet (434 m))	Johnsonburg, Pennsylvania	41°29′40″N 78°33′25″W	St. Marys, Pennsylvania
Riley Run	5	Right	41°27′14″N 78°42′31″W (elev. 1,414 feet (431 m))	Ridgway Township, Elk County	41°28′22″N 78°41′53″W	Ridgway Township, Elk County
Little Mill Creek	6	Right	41°27′12″N 78°43′12″W (elev. 1,381 feet (421 m))	Ridgway Township, Elk County	41°33′25″N 78°45′29″W	Jones Township, Elk County
Mason Creek	7	Right	41°26′20″N 78°43′54″W (elev. 1,371 feet (418 m))	Ridgway Township, Elk County	41°28′12″N 78°45′52″W	Ridgway Township, Elk County
Elk Creek	8	Left	41°25′18″N 78°44′03″W (elev. 1,362 feet (415 m))	Ridgway, Pennsylvania	41°28′49″N 78°33′57″W	St. Marys, Pennsylvania
Island Run	9	Left	41°23′50″N 78°45′09″W (elev. 1,348 feet (411 m))	Ridgway Township, Elk County	41°23′53″N 78°45′06″W	Ridgway Township, Elk County
Big Mill Creek	10	Right	41°23′44″N 78°45′46″W (elev. 1,342 feet (409 m))	Ridgway Township, Elk County	41°35′55″N 78°47′34″W	Jones Township, Elk County
Connerville Run	11	Right	41°22′49″N 78°46′59″W (elev. 1,332 feet (406 m))	Ridgway Township, Elk County	41°23′46″N 78°47′39″W	Ridgway Township, Elk County
Dog Hollow Run	12	Left	41°22′26″N 78°47′32″W (elev. 1,325 feet (404 m))	Ridgway Township, Elk County	41°21′43″N 78°45′22″W	Ridgway Township, Elk County
Gillis Run	13	Right	41°22′29″N 78°48′43″W (elev. 1,329 feet (405 m))	Ridgway Township, Elk County	41°23′13″N 78°48′12″W	Ridgway Township, Elk County
Little Toby Creek	14	Left	41°21′59″N 78°49′25″W (elev. 1,322 feet (403 m))	Spring Creek Township, Elk County	41°19′55″N 78°36′32″W	Fox Township, Elk County
Bear Creek	15	Right	41°22′53″N 78°49′53″W (elev. 1,335 feet (407 m))	Spring Creek Township, Elk County	41°34′04″N 78°49′05″W	Highland Township, Elk County
Mahood Run	16	Left	41°22′24″N 78°51′03″W (elev. 1,302 feet (397 m))	Spring Creek Township, Elk County	41°21′12″N 78°50′43″W	Spring Creek Township, Elk County
Beech Bottom Run	17	Left	41°23′21″N 78°52′30″W (elev. 1,289 feet (393 m))	Spring Creek Township, Elk County	41°20′41″N 78°51′16″W	Spring Creek Township, Elk County
Lake City Run	18	Left	41°23′21″N 78°52′34″W (elev. 1,283 feet (391 m))	Spring Creek Township, Elk County	41°22′06″N 78°53′28″W	Spring Creek Township, Elk County
Crow Run	19	Right	41°23′53″N 78°53′09″W (elev. 1,276 feet (389 m))	Spring Creek Township, Elk County	41°26′08″N 78°51′27″W	Spring Creek Township, Elk County
Irwin Run	20	Right	41°24′00″N 78°54′19″W (elev. 1,276 feet (389 m))	Spring Creek Township, Elk County	41°26′56″N 78°52′41″W	Spring Creek Township, Elk County
Spring Creek	21	Right	41°24′02″N 78°55′57″W (elev. 1,257 feet (383 m))	Spring Creek Township, Elk County	41°32′23″N 79°01′40″W	Howe Township, Forest County
Maxwell Run	22	Left	41°23′04″N 78°56′05″W (elev. 1,250 feet (380 m))	Spring Creek Township, Elk County	41°19′03″N 78°51′15″W	Spring Creek Township, Elk County
Elliott Run	23	Right	41°22′57″N 78°56′37″W (elev. 1,257 feet (383 m))	Spring Creek Township, Elk County	41°23′38″N 78°57′45″W	Millstone Township, Elk County
Daugherty Run	24	Left	41°22′11″N 78°57′38″W (elev. 1,253 feet (382 m))	Heath Township, Jefferson County	41°21′27″N 78°56′22″W	Spring Creek Township, Elk County
Raught Run	25	Left	41°22′10″N 78°57′50″W (elev. 1,240 feet (380 m))	Heath Township, Jefferson County	41°20′10″N 78°58′00″W	Heath Township, Jefferson County
Painter Run	26		41°22′18″N 78°58′01″W (elev. 1,237 feet (377 m))	Heath Township, Jefferson County	41°23′17″N 78°58′02″W	Millstone Township, Elk County
Church Run	27	Right	41°22′35″N 78°58′24″W (elev. 1,243 feet (379 m))	Millstone Township, Elk County	41°24′06″N 78°59′21″W	Millstone Township, Elk County
Clyde Run	28	Right	41°22′23″N 78°58′34″W (elev. 1,230 feet (370 m))	Heath Township, Jefferson County	41°22′58″N 78°59′27″W	Millstone Township, Elk County
Callen Run	29	Left	41°21′01″N 79°00′54″W (elev. 1,240 feet (380 m))	Heath Township, Jefferson County	41°18′50″N 78°57′43″W	Polk Township, Jefferson County
Cline Run	30	Right	41°21′26″N 79°01′37″W (elev. 1,237 feet (377 m))	Millstone Township, Elk County	41°22′54″N 79°00′32″W	Millstone Township, Elk County
Wyncoop Run	31	Right	41°21′26″N 79°02′15″W (elev. 1,207 feet (368 m))	Heath Township, Jefferson County	41°24′08″N 79°00′12″W	Millstone Township, Elk County
Leeper Run	32	Left	41°21′16″N 79°02′32″W (elev. 1,224 feet (373 m))	Heath Township, Jefferson County	41°20′06″N 79°01′59″W	Heath Township, Jefferson County
Pine Run	33	Left	41°21′00″N 79°03′35″W (elev. 1,207 feet (368 m))	Heath Township, Jefferson County	41°19′51″N 79°02′44″W	Heath Township, Jefferson County
Millstone Creek	34	Right	41°21′13″N 79°04′17″W (elev. 1,207 feet (368 m))	Millstone Township, Elk County	41°22′25″N 79°05′02″W	Millstone Township, Elk County
Shippen Run	35	Right	41°20′33″N 79°05′57″W (elev. 1,197 feet (365 m))	Barnett Township, Forest County	41°22′07″N 79°06′00″W	Barnett Township, Forest County
Clear Creek	36	Left	41°19′46″N 79°06′12″W (elev. 1,194 feet (364 m))	Barnett Township, Jefferson County	41°19′09″N 79°00′28″W	Heath Township, Jefferson County
Tadler Run	37	Left	41°19′49″N 79°07′28″W (elev. 1,194 feet (364 m))	Barnett Township, Jefferson County	41°18′41″N 79°06′57″W	Barnett Township, Jefferson County
Cherry Run	38	Right	41°19′59″N 79°07′32″W (elev. 1,207 feet (368 m))	Barnett Township, Forest County	41°22′37″N 79°08′02″W	Barnett Township, Forest County
Maple Creek	39	Right	41°20′29″N 79°08′18″W (elev. 1,178 feet (359 m))	Barnett Township, Jefferson County	41°27′12″N 79°08′21″W	Jenks Township, Forest County
Coleman Run	40	Right	41°20′38″N 79°09′56″W (elev. 1,184 feet (361 m))	Barnett Township, Forest County	41°22′42″N 79°12′39″W	Farmington Township, Clarion County
Troutman Run	41	Right	41°20′20″N 79°11′05″W (elev. 1,161 feet (354 m))	Barnett Township, Jefferson County	41°21′19″N 79°12′01″W	Barnett Township, Forest County
Henry Run	42	Right	41°19′27″N 79°11′31″W (elev. 1,155 feet (352 m))	Barnett Township, Jefferson County	41°20′20″N 79°12′12″W	Barnett Township, Forest County
Toms Run	43	Right	41°19′55″N 79°12′25″W (elev. 1,158 feet (353 m))	Barnett Township, Forest County	41°24′41″N 79°14′20″W	Farmington Township, Clarion County
Henry Run	44	Right	41°19′15″N 79°13′36″W (elev. 1,145 feet (349 m))	Farmington Township, Clarion County	41°21′17″N 79°15′06″W	Farmington Township, Clarion County
Cathers Run	45	Left	41°19′00″N 79°14′01″W (elev. 1,138 feet (347 m))	Millcreek Township, Clarion County	41°15′00″N 79°06′59″W	Eldred Township, Jefferson County
Watson Run	46	Right	41°18′32″N 79°15′26″W (elev. 1,122 feet (342 m))	Farmington Township, Clarion County	41°19′49″N 79°16′04″W	Farmington Township, Clarion County
Maxwell Run	47	Left	41°17′30″N 79°16′08″W (elev. 1,125 feet (343 m))	Millcreek Township, Clarion County	41°17′20″N 79°13′45″W	Millcreek Township, Clarion County
Callihan Run	48	Right	41°16′48″N 79°17′42″W (elev. 1,102 feet (336 m))	Highland Township, Clarion County	41°18′36″N 79°17′05″W	Highland Township, Clarion County
Blyson Run	49	Left	41°16′07″N 79°18′09″W (elev. 1,096 feet (334 m))	Millcreek Township, Clarion County	41°16′03″N 79°14′38″W	Millcreek Township, Clarion County
McGourvey Run	50	Right	41°14′34″N 79°18′47″W (elev. 1,089 feet (332 m))	Millcreek Township, Clarion County	41°16′13″N 79°19′35″W	Highland Township, Clarion County
Mill Creek	51	Left	41°14′08″N 79°19′16″W (elev. 1,089 feet (332 m))	Millcreek Township, Clarion County	41°15′32″N 79°06′35″W	Eldred Township, Jefferson County
Reed Run	52	Right	41°13′36″N 79°20′19″W (elev. 1,089 feet (332 m))	Highland Township, Clarion County	41°14′58″N 79°20′36″W	Highland Township, Clarion County
Toby Creek	53	Right	41°13′35″N 79°23′24″W (elev. 1,089 feet (332 m))	Highland Township, Clarion County	41°23′18″N 79°16′51″W	Farmington Township, Clarion County
Trout Run	54	Left	41°12′08″N 79°24′22″W (elev. 1,093 feet (333 m))	Monroe Township, Clarion County	41°11′40″N 79°22′19″W	Clarion Township, Clarion County
Courtleys Run	55	Left	41°11′20″N 79°24′43″W (elev. 1,119 feet (341 m))	Monroe Township, Clarion County	41°11′25″N 79°23′16″W	Monroe Township, Clarion County
Piney Reservoir	56		41°11′30″N 79°26′05″W (elev. 1,053 feet (321 m))	Piney Township, Clarion County		
Piney Dam	57		41°11′32″N 79°26′01″W (elev. 1,056 feet (322 m))	Paint Township, Clarion County		
Piney Creek	58	Left	41°10′10″N 79°28′24″W (elev. 997 feet (304 m))	Piney Township, Clarion County	41°09′44″N 79°14′09″W	Limestone Township, Clarion County
Deer Creek	59	Right	41°10′18″N 79°28′44″W (elev. 997 feet (304 m))	Beaver Township, Clarion County	41°17′16″N 79°31′46″W	Ashland Township, Clarion County
Canoe Creek	60	Right	41°09′44″N 79°31′58″W (elev. 984 feet (300 m))	Beaver Township, Clarion County	41°16′28″N 79°33′54″W	Ashland Township, Clarion County
Beaver Creek	61	Right	41°09′37″N 79°32′50″W (elev. 978 feet (298 m))	Licking Township, Clarion County	41°15′56″N 79°35′03″W	Ashland Township, Clarion County
Licking Creek	62	Left	41°07′44″N 79°33′35″W (elev. 958 feet (292 m))	Licking Township, Clarion County	41°03′55″N 79°26′12″W	Porter Township, Clarion County
Turkey Run	63	Right	41°09′12″N 79°37′50″W (elev. 892 feet (272 m))	Richland Township, Clarion County	41°14′35″N 79°36′21″W	Salem Township, Clarion County

== Redbank Creek ==
Tributaries of Redbank Creek
Name	Number	Bank	Mouth	Political subdivision	Source	Political subdivision
Sandy Lick Creek	1	Left	41°09′30″N 79°04′36″W (elev. 1,194 feet (364 m))	Brookville, Pennsylvania	41°11′44″N 78°40′19″W	Sandy Township, Clearfield County
North Fork Creek	2	Right	41°09′30″N 79°04′36″W (elev. 1,194 feet (364 m))	Brookville, Pennsylvania	41°19′07″N 78°53′59″W	Polk Township, Jefferson County
Clement Run	3	Right	41°08′37″N 79°06′56″W (elev. 1,188 feet (362 m))	Rose Township, Jefferson County	41°10′34″N 79°06′16″W	Rose Township, Jefferson County
Rattlesnake Run	4	Left	41°08′04″N 79°08′36″W (elev. 1,175 feet (358 m))	Clover Township, Jefferson County	41°06′45″N 79°06′39″W	Rose Township, Jefferson County
Thompson Run	5	Right	41°07′59″N 79°09′02″W (elev. 1,168 feet (356 m))	Clover Township, Jefferson County	41°09′12″N 79°09′36″W	Clover Township, Jefferson County
Simpson Run	6	Right	41°08′00″N 79°09′25″W (elev. 1,171 feet (357 m))	Clover Township, Jefferson County	41°10′16″N 79°11′02″W	Union Township, Jefferson County
Welch Run	7	Right	41°07′29″N 79°10′53″W (elev. 1,158 feet (353 m))	Clover Township, Jefferson County	41°10′49″N 79°11′51″W	Corsica
Runaway Run	8	Right	41°06′58″N 79°11′44″W (elev. 1,138 feet (347 m))	Summerville	41°09′47″N 79°13′10″W	Limestone Township, Clarion County
Carrier Run	9	Left	41°06′32″N 79°11′58″W (elev. 1,138 feet (347 m))	Clover Township, Jefferson County	41°06′55″N 79°10′35″W	Clover Township, Jefferson County
Beaver Run	10	Left	41°05′21″N 79°10′57″W (elev. 1,129 feet (344 m))	Beaver Township, Jefferson County	41°03′47″N 79°05′41″W	Oliver Township, Jefferson County
Tarkiln Run	11	Left	41°04′13″N 79°11′12″W (elev. 1,109 feet (338 m))	Beaver Township, Jefferson County	41°04′26″N 79°08′50″W	Beaver Township, Jefferson County
Red Run	12	Left	41°03′55″N 79°11′23″W (elev. 1,112 feet (339 m))	Beaver Township, Jefferson County	41°03′35″N 79°10′02″W	Beaver Township, Jefferson County
Patton Run	13	Right	41°03′32″N 79°12′13″W (elev. 1,093 feet (333 m))	Beaver Township, Jefferson County	41°05′40″N 79°12′55″W	Redbank Township, Clarion County
Little Sandy Creek	14	Left	41°02′44″N 79°13′48″W (elev. 1,083 feet (330 m))	Redbank Township, Armstrong County	41°01′39″N 78°57′31″W	McCalmont Township, Jefferson County
Pine Creek	15	Left	41°01′40″N 79°15′46″W (elev. 1,070 feet (330 m))	Redbank Township, Clarion County	41°07′23″N 79°13′09″W	Limestone Township, Clarion County
Miller Run	16	Right	41°02′28″N 79°14′14″W (elev. 1,079 feet (329 m))	Redbank Township, Clarion County	41°03′51″N 79°13′23″W	Redbank Township, Clarion County
Town Run	17	Right	41°00′49″N 79°18′03″W (elev. 1,056 feet (322 m))	Redbank Township, Clarion County	41°05′51″N 79°16′43″W	Redbank Township, Clarion County
Middle Run>	18	Right	41°00′38″N 79°18′26″W (elev. 1,060 feet (320 m))	Redbank Township, Clarion County	41°03′19″N 79°18′33″W	Redbank Township, Clarion County
Leisure Run	19	Right	41°00′03″N 79°19′38″W (elev. 1,047 feet (319 m))	New Bethlehem	41°05′06″N 79°19′21″W	Redbank Township, Clarion County
Citizens Water Company Dam	20		41°00′06″N 79°20′05″W (elev. 1,066 feet (325 m))	New Bethlehem," "		
Long Run	21	Right	41°00′00″N 79°21′13″W (elev. 1,040 feet (320 m))	Porter Township, Clarion County	41°02′39″N 79°20′21″W	Porter Township, Clarion County
Leatherwood Creek	22	Right	40°59′39″N 79°23′20″W (elev. 981 feet (299 m))	Porter Township, Clarion County	41°05′34″N 79°20′05″W	Porter Township, Clarion County
Middle Run	23	Right	41°00′33″N 79°24′41″W (elev. 988 feet (301 m))	Porter Township, Clarion County	41°02′19″N 79°24′50″W	Porter Township, Clarion County
Rock Run	24	Right	40°59′22″N 79°25′27″W (elev. 942 feet (287 m))	Madison Township, Armstrong County	41°01′12″N 79°26′02″W	Porter Township, Clarion County
Wildcat Run	25	Right	40°59′44″N 79°29′19″W (elev. 873 feet (266 m))	Madison Township, Clarion County	41°03′20″N 79°28′30″W	Toby Township, Clarion County

=== North Fork Creek ===
North Fork Creek is formed by the confluence of Muddy Run and Williams Run in Polk Township, Jefferson County.

Tributaries of North Fork Creek
Name	Number	Bank	Mouth	Political subdivision	Source	Political subdivision
Williams Run	1	Left	41°19′07″N 78°53′59″W (elev. 1,581 feet (482 m))	Polk Township, Jefferson County	41°18′53″N 78°51′33″W	Snyder Township, Jefferson County
Muddy Run	2	Right	41°19′08″N 78°53′59″W (elev. 1,581 feet (482 m))	Polk Township, Jefferson County	41°19′37″N 78°55′03″W	Polk Township, Jefferson County
Bearpen Run	3	Left	41°18′45″N 78°54′16″W (elev. 1,558 feet (475 m))	Polk Township, Jefferson County	41°18′14″N 78°51′21″W	Snyder Township, Jefferson County
Manners Dam Run	4	Left	41°18′16″N 78°54′44″W (elev. 1,519 feet (463 m))	Polk Township, Jefferson County	41°17′16″N 78°52′41″W	Snyder Township, Jefferson County
Hetrick Run	5	Right	41°17′43″N 78°55′36″W (elev. 1,489 feet (454 m))	Polk Township, Jefferson County	41°17′55″N 78°58′00″W	Polk Township, Jefferson County
Lucas Run	6	Left	41°17′04″N 78°55′35″W (elev. 1,486 feet (453 m))	Polk Township, Jefferson County	41°16′44″N 78°52′33″W	Snyder Township, Jefferson County
South Branch North Fork Redbank Creek	7	Left	41°16′09″N 78°56′08″W (elev. 1,447 feet (441 m))	Polk Township, Jefferson County	41°17′32″N 78°52′06″W	Snyder Township, Jefferson County
Acy Run	8	Left	41°15′50″N 78°56′55″W (elev. 1,430 feet (440 m))	Polk Township, Jefferson County	41°15′04″N 78°56′31″W	Warsaw Township, Jefferson County
Seneca Run	9	Left	41°15′26″N 78°57′43″W (elev. 1,414 feet (431 m))	Warsaw Township, Jefferson County	41°12′34″N 78°56′27″W	Warsaw Township, Jefferson County
Windfall Run	10	Right	41°15′10″N 79°01′45″W (elev. 1,345 feet (410 m))	Warsaw Township, Jefferson County	41°18′16″N 78°58′25″W	Polk Township, Jefferson County
Clear Run	11	Right	41°15′20″N 79°02′30″W (elev. 1,339 feet (408 m))	Warsaw Township, Jefferson County	41°19′02″N 78°59′16″W	Heath Township, Jefferson County
Tarkiln Run	12	Right	41°15′16″N 79°02′40″W (elev. 1,332 feet (406 m))	Warsaw Township, Jefferson County	41°16′45″N 79°04′34″W	Eldred Township, Jefferson County
Shippen Run	13		41°14′41″N 79°02′57″W (elev. 1,312 feet (400 m))	Warsaw Township, Jefferson County	41°16′37″N 79°05′58″W	Eldred Township, Jefferson County
Craft Run	14	Right	41°14′04″N 79°02′30″W (elev. 1,480 feet (450 m))	Warsaw Township, Jefferson County	41°14′49″N 79°05′45″W	Eldred Township, Jefferson County
Red Lick Run	15	Right	41°11′59″N 79°03′59″W (elev. 1,549 feet (472 m))	Pine Creek Township, Jefferson County	41°14′07″N 79°06′05″W	Eldred Township, Jefferson County
Yeomans Run	16		41°11′15″N 79°04′35″W (elev. 1,230 feet (370 m))	Rose Township, Jefferson County	41°11′42″N 79°05′45″W	Eldred Township, Jefferson County
Sugarcamp Run	17	Left	41°11′07″N 79°04′29″W (elev. 1,234 feet (376 m))	Pine Creek Township, Jefferson County	41°11′59″N 79°01′32″W	Warsaw Township, Jefferson County
Sugar Camp Run	18	Right	41°10′37″N 79°04′26″W (elev. 1,220 feet (370 m))	Rose Township, Jefferson County	41°11′16″N 79°06′20″W	Rose Township, Jefferson County
Brookville Reservoir	19		41°10′12″N 79°04′23″W (elev. 1,234 feet (376 m))	Brookville, Pennsylvania		
Brookville Waterworks Dam	20		41°10′12″N 79°04′23″W (elev. 1,234 feet (376 m))	Brookville, Pennsylvania		

=== Sandy Lick Creek ===
Sandy Lick Creek

Tributaries of Sandy Lick Creek
Name	Number	Bank	Mouth	Political subdivision	Source	Political subdivision
Lake Sabula	1		41°09′28″N 78°39′58″W (elev. 1,460 feet (450 m))	Sandy Township, Clearfield County		
Coal Run	2	Left	41°08′26″N 78°40′59″W (elev. 1,430 feet (440 m))	Sandy Township, Clearfield County	41°07′52″N 78°38′48″W	Union Township
Muddy Run	3	Right	41°08′21″N 78°41′15″W (elev. 1,424 feet (434 m))	Sandy Township, Clearfield County	41°09′58″N 78°40′57″W	Sandy Township, Clearfield County
Narrows Creek	4	Right	41°07′59″N 78°41′45″W (elev. 1,421 feet (433 m))	Sandy Township, Clearfield County	41°12′17″N 78°41′40″W	Sandy Township, Clearfield County
Gravel Lick Run	5	Right	41°07′28″N 78°42′56″W (elev. 1,407 feet (429 m))	Sandy Township, Clearfield County	41°09′20″N 78°42′14″W	Sandy Township, Clearfield County
Laborde Branch	6	Left	41°07′05″N 78°43′41″W (elev. 1,401 feet (427 m))	Sandy Township, Clearfield County	41°03′35″N 78°42′21″W	Brady Township, Clearfield County
Reisinger Run	7	Left	41°07′06″N 78°45′13″W (elev. 1,398 feet (426 m))	DuBois, Pennsylvania	41°05′17″N 78°44′19″W	Brady Township, Clearfield County
Pentz Run	8	Left	41°07′21″N 78°45′47″W (elev. 1,398 feet (426 m))	DuBois	41°05′01″N 78°45′04″W	Brady Township, Clearfield County
Beaver Run	9	Right	41°07′30″N 78°45′45″W (elev. 1,398 feet (426 m))	DuBois	41°08′41″N 78°43′25″W	Sandy Township, Clearfield County
Clear Run	10	Right	41°07′40″N 78°46′13″W (elev. 1,398 feet (426 m))	DuBois	41°09′45″N 78°45′50″W	Sandy Township, Clearfield County
Slab Run	11	Right	41°08′14″N 78°47′22″W (elev. 1,384 feet (422 m))	Sandy Township, Clearfield County	41°09′53″N 78°46′13″W	Sandy Township, Clearfield County
Wolf Run	12	Right	41°08′14″N 78°47′35″W (elev. 1,381 feet (421 m))	Sandy Township, Clearfield County	41°11′54″N 78°42′46″W	Sandy Township, Clearfield County
Panther Run	13	Right	41°07′18″N 78°52′26″W (elev. 1,371 feet (418 m))	Winslow Township, Jefferson County	41°08′43″N 78°53′29″W	Washington Township, Jefferson County
Pitchpine Run	14	Left	41°05′47″N 78°53′33″W (elev. 1,358 feet (414 m))	Reynoldsville	41°06′47″N 78°51′15″W	Winslow Township, Jefferson County
Soldier Run	15	Left	41°05′21″N 78°53′33″W (elev. 1,352 feet (412 m))	Reynoldsville	41°05′20″N 78°47′13″W	Sandy Township, Clearfield County
Trout Run	16	Left	41°05′14″N 78°54′35″W (elev. 1,352 feet (412 m))	Winslow Township, Jefferson County	41°03′25″N 78°50′55″W	Winslow Township, Jefferson County
Schoolhouse Run	17	Left	41°05′29″N 78°55′24″W (elev. 1,345 feet (410 m))	Winslow Township, Jefferson County	41°07′48″N 78°54′08″W	Winslow Township, Jefferson County
O'Donnell Run	18	Right	41°05′46″N 78°56′22″W (elev. 1,345 feet (410 m))	Winslow Township, Jefferson County	41°08′17″N 78°55′16″W	Washington Township, Jefferson County
Camp Run	19	Left	41°05′19″N 78°58′00″W (elev. 1,325 feet (404 m))	Knox Township, Jefferson County	41°02′30″N 78°56′54″W	McCalmont Township, Jefferson County
Fuller Run	20	Left	41°05′51″N 78°59′21″W (elev. 1,302 feet (397 m))	Knox Township, Jefferson County	41°04′28″N 79°00′19″W	Knox Township, Jefferson County
Cable Run	21	Right	41°06′52″N 78°59′48″W (elev. 1,293 feet (394 m))	Pine Creek Township, Jefferson County	41°07′43″N 78°58′51″W	Pine Creek Township, Jefferson County
Mill Creek	22	Right	41°09′22″N 79°03′11″W (elev. 1,230 feet (370 m))	Pine Creek Township, Jefferson County	41°14′53″N 78°49′18″W	Snyder Township, Jefferson County
Horm Run	22.1	Left	41°10′31″N 78°56′26″W (elev. 1,460 feet (450 m))	Washington Township, Jefferson County	41°09′57″N 78°52′40″W	Washington Township, Jefferson County
Fivemile Run	22.2	Left	41°09′40″N 79°00′04″W (elev. 1,306 feet (398 m))	Pine Creek Township, Jefferson County	41°08′28″N 78°55′28″W	Washington Township, Jefferson County
Little Mill Creek	22.3	Right	41°09′44″N 79°02′01″W (elev. 1,250 feet (380 m))	Pine Creek Township	41°12′11″N 78°57′35″W	Warsaw Township
Fivemile Run	23	Left	41°08′54″N 79°04′32″W (elev. 1,224 feet (373 m))	Pine Creek Township, Jefferson County	41°06′11″N 79°01′41″W	Knox Township, Jefferson County

=== Little Sandy Creek ===
Tributaries of Little Sandy Creek
Name	Number	Bank	Mouth	Political subdivision	Source	Political subdivision
Middle Branch Little Sandy Creek	1	Right	41°02′20″N 79°01′30″W (elev. 1,394 feet (425 m))	Oliver Township, Jefferson County	41°03′58″N 79°00′35″W	Knox Township, Jefferson County
Hickok Run	2	Left	41°02′04″N 79°01′54″W (elev. 1,362 feet (415 m))	Oliver Township, Jefferson County	41°01′50″N 79°00′04″W	McCalmont Township, Jefferson County
Clutch Run	3	Left	41°01′41″N 79°02′40″W (elev. 1,316 feet (401 m))	Oliver Township, Jefferson County	41°00′53″N 78°59′35″W	McCalmont Township, Jefferson County
Indiancamp Run	4	Right	41°01′56″N 79°03′01″W (elev. 1,299 feet (396 m))	Oliver Township, Jefferson County	41°04′59″N 79°01′32″W	Knox Township, Jefferson County
Lick Run	5	Right	41°02′42″N 79°05′22″W (elev. 1,234 feet (376 m))	Oliver Township, Jefferson County	41°04′39″N 79°05′28″W	Rose Township, Jefferson County
Big Run	6	Left	41°01′30″N 79°07′56″W (elev. 1,188 feet (362 m))	Ringgold Township, Jefferson County	40°58′16″N 79°02′03″W	Perry Township, Jefferson County
Ferguson Run	7	Right	41°02′06″N 79°10′12″W (elev. 1,155 feet (352 m))	Beaver Township, Jefferson County	41°03′37″N 79°07′56″W	Beaver Township, Jefferson County
Cherry Run	8	Left	41°01′58″N 79°11′05″W (elev. 1,142 feet (348 m))	Ringgold Township, Jefferson County	40°59′04″N 79°10′12″W	Ringgold Township, Jefferson County
Brocious Run	9	Right	41°02′25″N 79°12′06″W (elev. 1,132 feet (345 m))	Beaver Township, Jefferson County	41°02′58″N 79°11′23″W	Beaver Township, Jefferson County
Nolf Run	10	Left	41°02′21″N 79°13′06″W (elev. 1,109 feet (338 m))	Redbank Township, Armstrong County	41°00′11″N 79°12′24″W	Ringgold Township, Jefferson County

== Mahoning Creek ==
Tributaries of Mahoning Creek
Name	Number	Bank	Mouth	Political subdivision	Source	Political subdivision
East Branch Mahoning Creek	1	Left	40°58′26″N 78°51′22″W (elev. 1,293 feet (394 m))	Henderson Township, Jefferson County	41°02′19″N 78°42′18″W	Brady Township, Clearfield County
Stump Creek	2	Right	40°58′26″N 78°51′22″W (elev. 1,293 feet (394 m))	Henderson Township, Jefferson County	41°02′57″N 78°42′36″W	Brady Township, Clearfield County
Big Run	3	None	40°58′05″N 78°53′21″W (elev. 1,266 feet (386 m))	Big Run	41°01′40″N 78°56′57″W	McCalmont Township, Jefferson County
Rock Run	4	Right	40°57′58″N 78°54′29″W (elev. 1,263 feet (385 m))	Bell Township, Jefferson County	40°58′37″N 78°55′58″W	Bell Township, Jefferson County
Graffius Run	5	Right	40°57′13″N 78°55′42″W (elev. 1,250 feet (380 m))	Bell Township, Jefferson County	40°58′58″N 78°56′11″W	Bell Township, Jefferson County
Jackson Run	6	Left	40°56′46″N 78°55′41″W (elev. 1,260 feet (380 m))	Bell Township, Jefferson County	40°56′33″N 78°52′57″W	Gaskill Township, Jefferson County
Canoe Creek	7	Left	40°56′13″N 78°56′15″W (elev. 1,240 feet (380 m))	Bell Township, Jefferson County	40°54′06″N 79°00′32″W	North Mahoning Township, Indiana County
Elk Run	8	Right	40°56′57″N 78°57′52″W (elev. 1,234 feet (376 m))	Punxsutawney	41°01′18″N 78°59′02″W	McCalmont Township, Jefferson County
Sawmill Run	9	Right	40°56′29″N 78°59′19″W (elev. 1,217 feet (371 m))	Punxsutawney	40°59′03″N 79°01′16″W	Oliver Township, Jefferson County
Rose Run	10	Right	40°55′58″N 79°01′52″W (elev. 1,197 feet (365 m))	Perry Township, Jefferson County	40°57′40″N 79°03′13″W	Perry Township, Jefferson County
Nicely Run	11	Right	40°55′28″N 79°03′06″W (elev. 1,171 feet (357 m))	Perry Township, Jefferson County	40°56′50″N 79°04′33″W	Perry Township, Jefferson County
Dutch Run	12	Left	40°54′41″N 79°03′19″W (elev. 1,175 feet (358 m))	Perry Township, Jefferson County	40°53′38″N 79°01′05″W	North Mahoning Township, Indiana County
Perryville Run	13	Right	40°55′20″N 79°04′46″W (elev. 1,168 feet (356 m))	Perry Township, Jefferson County	40°57′41″N 79°05′51″W	Perry Township, Jefferson County
Foundry Run	14	Right	40°55′11″N 79°04′58″W (elev. 1,161 feet (354 m))	Perry Township, Jefferson County	40°57′16″N 79°06′46″W	Perry Township, Jefferson County
Steer Run	15	Right	40°54′16″N 79°07′49″W (elev. 1,165 feet (355 m))	West Mahoning Township, Indiana County	40°55′55″N 79°07′33″W	Porter Township, Jefferson County
Carr Run	16	Left	40°53′40″N 79°08′55″W (elev. 1,142 feet (348 m))	West Mahoning Township, Indiana County	40°53′03″N 79°05′45″W	North Mahoning Township, Indiana County
Hamilton Run	17	Right	40°53′58″N 79°09′47″W (elev. 1,129 feet (344 m))	West Mahoning Township, Indiana County	40°56′38″N 79°08′32″W	Porter Township, Jefferson County
Sugarcamp Run	18	Right	40°53′45″N 79°11′32″W (elev. 1,112 feet (339 m))	West Mahoning Township, Indiana County	40°55′39″N 79°09′44″W	Porter Township, Jefferson County
Little Mahoning Creek	19	Left	40°53′45″N 79°11′46″W (elev. 1,109 feet (338 m))	West Mahoning Township, Indiana County	40°44′11″N 78°57′17″W	Green Township, Indiana County
Foundry Run	20	Right	40°54′37″N 79°13′15″W (elev. 1,096 feet (334 m))	Wayne Township, Armstrong County	40°55′55″N 79°11′20″W	Porter Township, Jefferson County
Mahoning Creek Lake	21	None	40°55′04″N 79°13′44″W (elev. 1,096 feet (334 m))	Wayne Township, Armstrong County		
Glade Run	22	Left	40°54′53″N 79°15′47″W (elev. 1,099 feet (335 m))	Wayne Township, Armstrong County	40°50′42″N 79°12′23″W	West Mahoning Township, Indiana County
Mahoning Creek Dam	23	None	40°55′18″N 79°16′38″W (elev. 1,063 feet (324 m))	Redbank Township, Armstrong County		
Camp Run	24	Left	40°55′29″N 79°17′23″W (elev. 1,004 feet (306 m))	Wayne Township, Armstrong County	40°53′40″N 79°17′33″W	Wayne Township, Armstrong County
Pine Run	25	Right	40°56′47″N 79°16′39″W (elev. 1,004 feet (306 m))	Redbank Township, Armstrong County	40°58′10″N 79°06′29″W	Perry Township, Jefferson County
Little Mudlick Creek	26	Right	40°57′10″N 79°18′09″W (elev. 1,020 feet (310 m))	Redbank Township, Armstrong County	40°59′52″N 79°15′25″W	Redbank Township, Armstrong County
Cathcart Run	27	Right	40°57′25″N 79°18′45″W (elev. 958 feet (292 m))	Mahoning Township, Armstrong County	40°59′15″N 79°18′06″W	Mahoning Township, Armstrong County
Hamilton Run	28	Right	40°57′00″N 79°19′16″W (elev. 935 feet (285 m))	Mahoning Township, Armstrong County	40°58′46″N 79°19′44″W	Mahoning Township, Armstrong County
Cave Run	29	Left	40°56′19″N 79°22′19″W (elev. 869 feet (265 m))	Mahoning Township, Armstrong County	40°55′43″N 79°22′24″W	Mahoning Township, Armstrong County
Scrubgrass Creek	30	Left	40°55′33″N 79°25′26″W (elev. 837 feet (255 m))	Pine Township, Armstrong County	40°54′45″N 79°19′29″W	Wayne Township, Armstrong County

=== Pine Run ===
Tributaries of Pine Run
Name	Number	Bank	Mouth	Political subdivision	Source	Political subdivision
Middle Branch Pine Run	1	Left	40°57′54″N 79°08′57″W (elev. 1,306 feet (398 m))	Ringgold Township, Jefferson County	40°56′53″N 79°07′39″W	Porter Township, Jefferson County
Caylor Run	2	Right	40°58′05″N 79°10′14″W (elev. 1,273 feet (388 m))	Ringgold Township, Jefferson County	40°59′41″N 79°09′02″W	Ringgold Township, Jefferson County
Eagle Run	3	Right	40°57′53″N 79°12′00″W (elev. 1,237 feet (377 m))	Timblin	40°59′48″N 79°11′23″W	Ringgold Township, Jefferson County
Painter Run	4	Right	40°58′00″N 79°12′39″W (elev. 1,224 feet (373 m))	Timblin	40°59′59″N 79°11′33″W	Ringgold Township, Jefferson County
Nye Branch	5	Left	40°57′45″N 79°13′17″W (elev. 1,204 feet (367 m))	Redbank Township, Armstrong County	40°56′37″N 79°09′29″W	Porter Township, Jefferson County
Sugarcamp Run	6	Right	40°57′43″N 79°14′13″W (elev. 1,197 feet (365 m))	Redbank Township, Armstrong County	40°59′40″N 79°13′05″W	Redbank Township, Armstrong County
Mudlick Creek	7	Right	40°57′45″N 79°15′09″W (elev. 1,148 feet (350 m))	Redbank Township, Armstrong County	41°01′14″N 79°13′25″W	Redbank Township, Armstrong County

== Cowanshannock Creek ==
Tributaries of Cowanshannock Creek
Name	Number	Bank	Mouth	Political subdivision	Source	Political subdivision
Spruce Run	1	Right	40°49′01″N 79°14′41″W (elev. 1,155 feet (352 m))	Cowanshannock Township, Armstrong County	40°51′03″N 79°14′26″W	Wayne Township, Armstrong County
South Branch Cowanshannock Creek	2	Left	40°47′51″N 79°15′55″W (elev. 1,125 feet (343 m))	Cowanshannock Township, Armstrong County	40°49′15″N 79°10′40″W	South Mahoning Township, Indiana County
Craigs Run	3	Right	40°47′42″N 79°18′36″W (elev. 1,106 feet (337 m))	Rural Valley	40°49′40″N 79°18′30″W	Cowanshannock Township, Armstrong County
Huskins Run	4	Left	40°47′54″N 79°22′14″W (elev. 1,073 feet (327 m))	Cowanshannock Township, Armstrong County	40°45′16″N 79°20′40″W	Plumcreek Township, Armstrong County
Long Run	5	Right	40°48′34″N 79°24′40″W (elev. 1,020 feet (310 m))	Valley Township, Armstrong County	40°49′39″N 79°23′15″W	Valley Township, Armstrong County
Spra Run	6	Left	40°48′39″N 79°25′08″W (elev. 1,004 feet (306 m))	Valley Township, Armstrong County	40°45′54″N 79°23′04″W	Cowanshannock Township, Armstrong County
Mill Run	7	Left	40°48′29″N 79°27′47″W (elev. 948 feet (289 m))	Rayburn Township, Armstrong County	40°45′57″N 79°23′30″W	Kittanning Township, Armstrong County

== Crooked Creek ==
Tributaries of Crooked Creek
Name	Number	Bank	Mouth	Political subdivision	Source	Political subdivision
Rayne Run	1	Right	40°42′47″N 79°03′36″W (elev. 1,106 feet (337 m))	Rayne Township, Indiana County	40°45′56″N 79°01′25″W	East Mahoning Township, Indiana County
Brush Run	2	Right	40°43′20″N 79°05′49″W (elev. 1,076 feet (328 m))	Rayne Township, Indiana County	40°44′43″N 79°03′57″W	Rayne Township, Indiana County
Pine Run	3	Right	40°43′20″N 79°06′07″W (elev. 1,073 feet (327 m))	Rayne Township, Indiana County	40°46′41″N 79°02′08″W	East Mahoning Township, Indiana County
Twomile Run	4	Right	40°41′17″N 79°10′53″W (elev. 1,030 feet (310 m))	Washington Township, Indiana County	40°42′37″N 79°12′24″W	Washington Township, Indiana County
McKee Run	5	Left	40°40′51″N 79°11′23″W (elev. 1,027 feet (313 m))	Creekside	40°41′30″N 79°05′54″W	Rayne Township, Indiana County
Fulton Run	6	Left	40°40′03″N 79°12′36″W (elev. 1,020 feet (310 m))	White Township, Indiana County	40°38′24″N 79°10′07″W	White Township, Indiana County
Dark Hollow Run	7	Right	40°39′32″N 79°15′19″W (elev. 1,001 feet (305 m))	Armstrong Township, Indiana County	40°42′34″N 79°13′00″W	Washington Township, Indiana County
Mitchell Run	8	Right	40°39′26″N 79°16′13″W (elev. 994 feet (303 m))	Armstrong Township, Indiana County	40°42′09″N 79°14′53″W	Washington Township, Indiana County
Curry Run	9	Left	40°39′22″N 79°16′55″W (elev. 988 feet (301 m))	Armstrong Township, Indiana County	40°37′18″N 79°12′56″W	Armstrong Township, Indiana County
–Cheese Run	9.1	Right	40°39′04″N 79°16′16″W (elev. 1,014 feet (309 m))	Armstrong Township, Indiana County	40°37′48″N 79°12′39″W	White Township, Indiana County
Anthony Run	10	Left	40°39′18″N 79°17′22″W (elev. 997 feet (304 m))	Armstrong Township, Indiana County	40°35′53″N 79°16′59″W	Armstrong Township, Indiana County
Walker Run	11	Left	40°39′38″N 79°19′04″W (elev. 978 feet (298 m))	Armstrong Township, Indiana County	40°37′12″N 79°18′10″W	Armstrong Township, Indiana County
Plum Creek	12	Right	40°39′56″N 79°19′45″W (elev. 965 feet (294 m))	Plumcreek Township, Armstrong County	40°43′14″N 79°18′09″W	Plumcreek Township, Armstrong County
–South Branch Plum Creek	12.1	Left	40°43′13″N 79°18′09″W (elev. 1,001 feet (305 m))	Plumcreek Township, Armstrong County	40°47′13″N 79°04′34″W	East Mahoning Township, Indiana County
–North Branch Plum Creek	12.2	Right	40°43′13″N 79°18′09″W (elev. 1,001 feet (305 m))	Plumcreek Township, Armstrong County	40°49′33″N 79°10′02″W	South Mahoning Township, Indiana County
–Cessna Run	12.3	Right	40°42′14″N 79°19′09″W (elev. 991 feet (302 m))	Plumcreek Township, Armstrong County	40°46′20″N 79°19′32″W	Cowanshannock Township, Armstrong County
–Dutch Run	12.4	Left	40°41′12″N 79°19′41″W (elev. 981 feet (299 m))	Plumcreek Township, Armstrong County	40°42′29″N 79°14′39″W	Washington Township, Indiana County
Gobblers Run	13	Left	40°38′03″N 79°21′37″W (elev. 955 feet (291 m))	South Bend Township, Armstrong County	40°37′11″N 79°18′39″W	Armstrong Township, Indiana County
Craig Run	14	Left	40°38′08″N 79°24′00″W (elev. 965 feet (294 m))	South Bend Township, Armstrong County	40°36′12″N 79°22′30″W	Young Township, Indiana County
Lindsay Run	15	Left	40°38′05″N 79°24′07″W (elev. 974 feet (297 m))	South Bend Township, Armstrong County	40°36′35″N 79°24′02″W	South Bend Township, Armstrong County
Sugar Run	16	Right	40°38′15″N 79°24′18″W (elev. 948 feet (289 m))	South Bend Township, Armstrong County	40°40′39″N 79°22′39″W	Plumcreek Township, Armstrong County
Fagley Run	17	Right	40°39′07″N 79°25′24″W (elev. 971 feet (296 m))	Burrell Township, Armstrong County	40°41′04″N 79°22′48″W	Plumcreek Township, Armstrong County
Crooked Creek Lake	18	None	40°39′46″N 79°28′05″W (elev. 869 feet (265 m))	Burrell Township, Armstrong County		
Cherry Run	19	Right	40°40′25″N 79°27′32″W (elev. 860 feet (260 m))	Burrell Township, Armstrong County	40°44′57″N 79°20′40″W	Plumcreek Township, Armstrong County
Pine Run	20	Right	40°41′15″N 79°28′28″W (elev. 915 feet (279 m))	Burrell Township, Armstrong County	40°43′04″N 79°26′45″W	Kittanning Township, Armstrong County
Beers Run	21	Left	40°41′51″N 79°30′17″W (elev. 843 feet (257 m))	Burrell Township, Armstrong County	40°41′01″N 79°31′16″W	Bethel Township, Armstrong County
Coal Bank Run	22	Left	40°42′12″N 79°30′41″W (elev. 843 feet (257 m))	Bethel Township, Armstrong County	40°41′22″N 79°31′19″W	Bethel Township, Armstrong County
Horney Camp Run	23	Right	40°42′30″N 79°29′59″W (elev. 850 feet (260 m))	Burrell Township, Armstrong County	40°43′43″N 79°27′09″W	Kittanning Township, Armstrong County
Paradise Beach	24	Left	40°42′51″N 79°29′56″W (elev. 853 feet (260 m))	Bethel Township, Armstrong County		
Elbow Run	25	Right	40°43′05″N 79°29′43″W (elev. 843 feet (257 m))	Kittanning Township, Armstrong County	40°44′06″N 79°27′27″W	Kittanning Township, Armstrong County
Crooked Creek Dam	26	None	40°42′56″N 79°30′35″W (elev. 915 feet (279 m))	Manor Township, Armstrong County		
Campbell Run	27	Right	40°43′43″N 79°32′13″W (elev. 781 feet (238 m))	Manor Township, Armstrong County	40°44′35″N 79°27′02″W	Kittanning Township, Armstrong County

== Kiskiminetas River ==
Tributaries of the Kiskiminetas River
Name	Number	Bank	Mouth	Political subdivision	Source	Political subdivision
Conemaugh River	1	Right	40°29′08″N 79°27′14″W (elev. 827 feet (252 m))	Saltsburg	40°19′54″N 78°55′30″W	Johnstown
Loyalhanna Creek	2	Left	40°29′07″N 79°27′16″W (elev. 827 feet (252 m))	Loyalhanna Township, Westmoreland County	40°07′45″N 79°20′20″W	Donegal Township, Westmoreland County
Blacklegs Creek	3	Right	40°30′02″N 79°27′15″W (elev. 823 feet (251 m))	Conemaugh Township, Indiana County	40°37′17″N 79°17′31″W	Armstrong Township, Indiana County
Sulphur Run	4	Right	40°31′33″N 79°26′59″W (elev. 820 feet (250 m))	Conemaugh Township, Indiana County	40°32′49″N 79°26′06″W	Kiskiminetas Township, Armstrong County
Long Run	5	Right	40°32′00″N 79°28′34″W (elev. 823 feet (251 m))	Kiskiminetas Township, Armstrong County	40°35′52″N 79°25′26″W	South Bend Township, Armstrong County
Wolford Run	6	Left	40°31′29″N 79°29′24″W (elev. 807 feet (246 m))	Bell Township, Westmoreland County	40°28′25″N 79°31′37″W	Loyalhanna Township, Westmoreland County
Flat Run	7	Right	40°32′10″N 79°30′17″W (elev. 801 feet (244 m))	Kiskiminetas Township, Armstrong County	40°34′06″N 79°28′16″W	Kiskiminetas Township, Armstrong County
Roaring Run	8	Right	40°33′04″N 79°32′10″W (elev. 801 feet (244 m))	Kiskiminetas Township, Armstrong County	40°36′18″N 79°26′27″W	Kiskiminetas Township, Armstrong County
Beaver Run	9	Left	40°34′35″N 79°34′03″W (elev. 787 feet (240 m))	Bell Township, Westmoreland County	40°21′40″N 79°32′34″W	Hempfield Township, Westmoreland County
Pine Run	10	Left	40°36′26″N 79°35′05″W (elev. 771 feet (235 m))	Allegheny Township, Westmoreland County	40°30′57″N 79°37′21″W	Washington Township, Westmoreland County
Carnahan Run	11	Right	40°36′44″N 79°35′02″W (elev. 768 feet (234 m))	Parks Township, Armstrong County	40°37′50″N 79°28′34″W	Kiskiminetas Township, Armstrong County
Guffy Run	12	Right	40°37′59″N 79°34′54″W (elev. 784 feet (239 m))	Parks Township, Armstrong County	40°40′46″N 79°33′25″W	Bethel Township, Armstrong County
Brady Run	13	Right	40°37′57″N 79°36′33″W (elev. 758 feet (231 m))	Leechburg	40°40′04″N 79°34′39″W	Gilpin Township, Armstrong County
Penn Run	14	Left	40°38′24″N 79°37′20″W (elev. 863 feet (263 m))	Allegheny Township, Westmoreland County	40°37′42″N 79°38′06″W	Allegheny Township, Westmoreland County
Elder Run	15	Right	40°38′52″N 79°37′33″W (elev. 755 feet (230 m))	Gilpin Township, Armstrong County	40°41′23″N 79°34′21″W	Gilpin Township, Armstrong County

=== Conemaugh River ===
Tributaries of Conemaugh River
Name	Number	Bank	Mouth	Political subdivision	Source	Political subdivision
Conemaugh River	0	Right	40°29′08″N 79°27′14″W (elev. 827 feet (252 m))	Saltsburg	40°19′54″N 78°55′30″W	Johnstown
Stonycreek River	1	Left	40°19′51″N 78°55′31″W (elev. 1,138 feet (347 m))	Johnstown	39°55′37″N 78°57′31″W	Berlin
Little Conemaugh River	2	Right	40°19′51″N 78°55′29″W (elev. 1,138 feet (347 m))	Johnstown	40°27′46″N 78°35′57″W	Cresson Township, Cambria County
Hinckston Run	3	Right	40°20′25″N 78°55′30″W (elev. 1,132 feet (345 m))	Johnstown	40°27′46″N 78°51′39″W	Jackson Township, Cambria County
Elk Run	4	Left	40°20′31″N 78°56′39″W (elev. 1,204 feet (367 m))	Lower Yoder Township, Cambria County	40°19′11″N 78°57′08″W	Westmont
Saint Clair Run	5	Left	40°20′56″N 78°56′26″W (elev. 1,158 feet (353 m))	Johnstown	40°20′09″N 78°59′41″W	Lower Yoder Township, Cambria County
Strayer Run	6	Left	40°20′59″N 78°56′58″W (elev. 1,253 feet (382 m))	Johnstown	40°21′38″N 78°59′06″W	Lower Yoder Township, Cambria County
Laurel Run	7	Right	40°21′50″N 78°56′30″W (elev. 1,122 feet (342 m))	West Taylor Township, Cambria County	40°27′06″N 78°53′08″W	Jackson Township, Cambria County
Clark Run	8	Right	40°24′39″N 78°59′11″W (elev. 1,125 feet (343 m))	East Wheatfield Township, Indiana County	40°23′45″N 78°57′47″W	Jackson Township, Cambria County
Findley Run	9	Right	40°24′46″N 78°59′25″W (elev. 1,109 feet (338 m))	East Wheatfield Township, Indiana County	40°25′40″N 78°55′44″W	Jackson Township, Cambria County
Big Spring Run	10	Left	40°24′10″N 79°01′51″W (elev. 1,070 feet (330 m))	St. Clair Township, Westmoreland County	40°22′30″N 78°58′50″W	Lower Yoder Township, Cambria County
Sugar Run	11	Left	40°24′10″N 79°01′40″W (elev. 1,086 feet (331 m))	St. Clair Township, Westmoreland County	40°21′49″N 78°59′26″W	Lower Yoder Township, Cambria County
Baldwin Creek	12	Left	40°22′42″N 79°03′53″W (elev. 1,056 feet (322 m))	St. Clair Township, Westmoreland County	40°20′16″N 79°01′34″W	St. Clair Township, Westmoreland County
Shannon Run	13	Left	40°22′23″N 79°05′43″W (elev. 1,053 feet (321 m))	St. Clair Township, Westmoreland County	40°19′16″N 79°02′04″W	St. Clair Township, Westmoreland County
Richards Run	14	Right	40°23′51″N 79°07′52″W (elev. 1,017 feet (310 m))	West Wheatfield Township, Indiana County	40°24′58″N 79°06′53″W	West Wheatfield Township, Indiana County
Tubmill Creek	15	Left	40°23′57″N 79°09′11″W (elev. 997 feet (304 m))	Bolivar	40°16′47″N 79°03′35″W	Fairfield Township, Westmoreland County
Roaring Run	16	Right	40°24′33″N 79°09′05″W (elev. 1,024 feet (312 m))	West Wheatfield Township, Indiana County	40°26′44″N 79°09′20″W	West Wheatfield Township, Indiana County
Toms Run	17	Right	40°25′39″N 79°13′21″W (elev. 948 feet (289 m))	Burrell Township, Indiana County	40°26′55″N 79°09′37″W	Burrell Township, Indiana County
McGee Run	18	Left	40°24′59″N 79°15′47″W (elev. 922 feet (281 m))	Derry Township, Westmoreland County	40°19′19″N 79°15′56″W	Ligonier Township, Westmoreland County
Stony Run	19	Left	40°26′06″N 79°17′38″W (elev. 919 feet (280 m))	Derry Township, Westmoreland County	40°22′16″N 79°19′56″W	Derry Township, Westmoreland County
Blacklick Creek	20	Right	40°27′10″N 79°18′04″W (elev. 906 feet (276 m))	Derry Township, Westmoreland County	40°29′02″N 78°55′25″W	Buffington Township, Indiana County
Aultmans Run	21	Right	40°28′10″N 79°20′13″W (elev. 906 feet (276 m))	Conemaugh Township, Indiana County	40°34′55″N 79°14′09″W	Center Township, Indiana County
Roaring Run	22	Right	40°28′16″N 79°20′21″W (elev. 909 feet (277 m))	Conemaugh Township, Indiana County	40°31′00″N 79°20′03″W	Conemaugh Township, Indiana County
Spruce Run	23	Left	40°27′06″N 79°21′26″W (elev. 909 feet (277 m))	Derry Township, Westmoreland County	40°23′31″N 79°21′02″W	Derry Township, Westmoreland County
Conemaugh River Lake	24	None	40°28′05″N 79°21′59″W (elev. 909 feet (277 m))	Conemaugh Township, Indiana County		
Conemaugh Dam	25	None	40°28′05″N 79°21′58″W (elev. 909 feet (277 m))	Derry Township, Westmoreland County		
Conemaugh Dam	26	None	40°28′00″N 79°21′59″W (elev. 853 feet (260 m))	Conemaugh Township, Indiana County		
Boatyard Run	27	Left	40°27′11″N 79°22′24″W (elev. 863 feet (263 m))	Derry Township, Westmoreland County	40°26′18″N 79°24′43″W	Loyalhanna Township, Westmoreland County
Elders Run	28	Right	40°28′15″N 79°24′09″W (elev. 850 feet (260 m))	Conemaugh Township, Indiana County	40°30′45″N 79°22′05″W	Conemaugh Township, Indiana County

=== Loyalhanna Creek ===
Tributaries of Loyalhanna Creek
Name	Number	Bank	Mouth	Political subdivision	Source	Political subdivision
Loyalhanna Creek	0	Left	40°29′07″N 79°27′16″W (elev. 827 feet (252 m))	Loyalhanna Township, Westmoreland County	40°07′45″N 79°20′20″W	Donegal Township, Westmoreland County
White Oak Run	1	Left	40°10′21″N 79°16′08″W (elev. 1,266 feet (386 m))	Cook Township, Westmoreland County	40°07′33″N 79°18′03″W	Donegal Township, Westmoreland County
Phoebe Run	2	Right	40°10′39″N 79°15′36″W (elev. 1,257 feet (383 m))	Cook Township, Westmoreland County	40°08′47″N 79°15′20″W	Cook Township, Westmoreland County
Linn Run	3	Right	40°12′06″N 79°14′51″W (elev. 1,227 feet (374 m))	Ligonier Township, Westmoreland County	40°06′53″N 79°11′07″W	Cook Township, Westmoreland County
Rolling Rock Creek	4	Right	40°12′31″N 79°13′54″W (elev. 1,194 feet (364 m))	Ligonier Township, Westmoreland County	40°10′36″N 79°08′43″W	Ligonier Township, Westmoreland County
Laughlintown Run	5	Right	40°13′09″N 79°13′13″W (elev. 1,175 feet (358 m))	Ligonier Township, Westmoreland County	40°12′54″N 79°11′01″W	Ligonier Township, Westmoreland County
Zimmerman Run	6	Right	40°13′24″N 79°13′10″W (elev. 1,171 feet (357 m))	Ligonier Township, Westmoreland County	40°13′40″N 79°10′04″W	Ligonier Township, Westmoreland County
Mill Creek	7	Right	40°14′56″N 79°15′11″W (elev. 1,135 feet (346 m))	Ligonier Township, Westmoreland County	40°14′46″N 79°07′43″W	Ligonier Township, Westmoreland County
Twomile Run	8	Left	40°15′00″N 79°15′58″W (elev. 1,138 feet (347 m))	Ligonier Township, Westmoreland County	40°11′20″N 79°16′43″W	Cook Township, Westmoreland County
Coalpit Run	9	Right	40°15′39″N 79°16′06″W (elev. 1,129 feet (344 m))	Ligonier Township, Westmoreland County	40°18′34″N 79°12′28″W	Fairfield Township, Westmoreland County
Fourmile Run	10	Left	40°15′38″N 79°17′06″W (elev. 1,122 feet (342 m))	Ligonier Township, Westmoreland County	40°06′22″N 79°22′22″W	Donegal Township, Westmoreland County
Miller Run	11	Right	40°17′33″N 79°20′26″W (elev. 1,020 feet (310 m))	Derry Township, Westmoreland County	40°18′33″N 79°17′27″W	Derry Township, Westmoreland County
Ninemile Run	12	Left	40°17′36″N 79°22′24″W (elev. 984 feet (300 m))	Unity Township, Westmoreland County	40°12′56″N 79°25′16″W	Mount Pleasant Township, Westmoreland County
Monastery Run	13	Left	40°18′26″N 79°23′22″W (elev. 981 feet (299 m))	Latrobe	40°15′56″N 79°25′53″W	Unity Township, Westmoreland County
Unity Run	14	Left	40°18′36″N 79°23′26″W (elev. 968 feet (295 m))	Latrobe	40°19′17″N 79°25′18″W	Unity Township, Westmoreland County
Saxman Run	15	Right	40°19′30″N 79°22′39″W (elev. 968 feet (295 m))	Derry Township, Westmoreland County	40°18′48″N 79°17′56″W	Derry Township, Westmoreland County
Union Run	16	Right	40°21′06″N 79°22′58″W (elev. 958 feet (292 m))	Derry Township, Westmoreland County	40°21′49″N 79°18′41″W	Derry Township, Westmoreland County
Keystone Run	17	Right	40°22′31″N 79°24′57″W (elev. 925 feet (282 m))	Unity Township, Westmoreland County	40°22′27″N 79°22′27″W	Derry Township, Westmoreland County
Crabtree Creek	18	Left	40°22′48″N 79°25′38″W (elev. 935 feet (285 m))	Salem Township, Westmoreland County	40°22′40″N 79°31′23″W	Salem Township, Westmoreland County
Whitethorn Creek	19	Left	40°25′25″N 79°26′55″W (elev. 925 feet (282 m))	Loyalhanna Township, Westmoreland County	40°22′56″N 79°31′01″W	Salem Township, Westmoreland County
Serviceberry Run	20	Left	40°26′33″N 79°26′58″W (elev. 932 feet (284 m))	Loyalhanna Township, Westmoreland County	40°26′27″N 79°29′20″W	Salem Township, Westmoreland County
Loyalhanna Lake	21	None	40°27′24″N 79°27′06″W (elev. 919 feet (280 m))	Loyalhanna Township, Westmoreland County		
Loyalhanna Dam	22	None	40°27′24″N 79°27′06″W (elev. 919 feet (280 m))	Loyalhanna Township, Westmoreland County		

=== Blacklegs Creek ===
Tributaries of Blacklegs Creek
Name	Number	Bank	Mouth	Political subdivision	Source	Political subdivision
Green Valley Lake	1	Left	40°35′45″N 79°18′35″W (elev. 1,132 feet (345 m))	Young Township, Indiana County		
Whisky Run	2	Right	40°33′41″N 79°21′40″W (elev. 955 feet (291 m))	Young Township, Indiana County	40°36′26″N 79°24′37″W	South Bend Township, Armstrong County
Hooper Run	3	Left	40°33′00″N 79°21′54″W (elev. 935 feet (285 m))	Young Township, Indiana County	40°35′15″N 79°18′54″W	Young Township, Indiana County
Nesbit Run	4	Right	40°32′35″N 79°22′04″W (elev. 922 feet (281 m))	Young Township, Indiana County	40°34′55″N 79°23′11″W	Young Township, Indiana County
Harpers Run	5	Right	40°32′11″N 79°22′33″W (elev. 912 feet (278 m))	Young Township, Indiana County	40°35′04″N 79°23′50″W	South Bend Township, Armstrong County
Marshall Run	6	Left	40°31′55″N 79°22′51″W (elev. 909 feet (277 m))	Conemaugh Township, Indiana County	40°31′22″N 79°19′07″W	Young Township, Indiana County
Big Run	7	Right	40°31′16″N 79°24′05″W (elev. 886 feet (270 m))	Conemaugh Township, Indiana County	40°36′52″N 79°25′46″W	South Bend Township, Armstrong County

== Buffalo Creek ==
Tributaries of Buffalo Creek
Name	Number	Bank	Mouth	Political subdivision	Source	Political subdivision
Little Buffalo Run	1	Right	40°51′55″N 79°42′06″W (elev. 1,079 feet (329 m))	Clearfield Township, Butler County	40°50′27″N 79°47′32″W	Summit Township, Butler County
Patterson Creek	2	Left	40°51′06″N 79°38′17″W (elev. 988 feet (301 m))	West Franklin Township, Armstrong County	40°57′11″N 79°40′51″W	Sugarcreek Township, Armstrong County
Marrowbone Run	3	Left	40°47′37″N 79°39′06″W (elev. 948 feet (289 m))	North Buffalo Township, Armstrong County	40°46′50″N 79°37′15″W	North Buffalo Township, Armstrong County
Rough Run	4	Right	40°47′05″N 79°41′16″W (elev. 873 feet (266 m))	North Buffalo Township, Armstrong County	40°49′13″N 79°48′14″W	Summit Township, Butler County
Sipes Run	5	Left	40°46′09″N 79°40′22″W (elev. 856 feet (261 m))	South Buffalo Township, Armstrong County	40°47′09″N 79°40′28″W	North Buffalo Township, Armstrong County
Cornplanter Run	6	Right	40°45′16″N 79°40′21″W (elev. 846 feet (258 m))	South Buffalo Township, Armstrong County	40°46′19″N 79°44′06″W	Winfield Township, Butler County
Pine Run	7	Left	40°43′59″N 79°40′46″W (elev. 830 feet (250 m))	South Buffalo Township, Armstrong County	40°46′33″N 79°37′33″W	North Buffalo Township, Armstrong County
Little Buffalo Creek	8	Right	40°42′32″N 79°42′08″W (elev. 801 feet (244 m))	Buffalo Township, Butler County	40°47′43″N 79°47′46″W	Jefferson Township, Butler County

== See also ==
- List of tributaries of the Allegheny River
