= Shaw Run =

Stream in Pennsylvania, U.S.

Coordinates: 41°18′19″N 79°42′22″W

Shaw Run is a stream in the U.S. state of Pennsylvania. It is a tributary of East Sandy Creek.

Shaw Run bears the name of John Shaw, the proprietor of a carding mill on the stream's banks.

== See also ==
- List of rivers in Pennsylvania
- List of rivers in the United States
- List of canals in the United States
