= Halls Run =

Stream in Pennsylvania, U.S.

Coordinates: 41°19′10″N 79°42′50″W

Halls Run is a stream in the U.S. state of Pennsylvania. It is a tributary of East Sandy Creek.

Halls Run was named after an Irish-American family of pioneer settlers.

== See also ==
- List of rivers in Pennsylvania
- List of rivers in the United States
- List of canals in the United States
