= Deerfield Township, Warren County, Pennsylvania =

Township in Pennsylvania, United States

Coordinates: 41°43′00″N 79°24′59″W

Deerfield Township
- Township
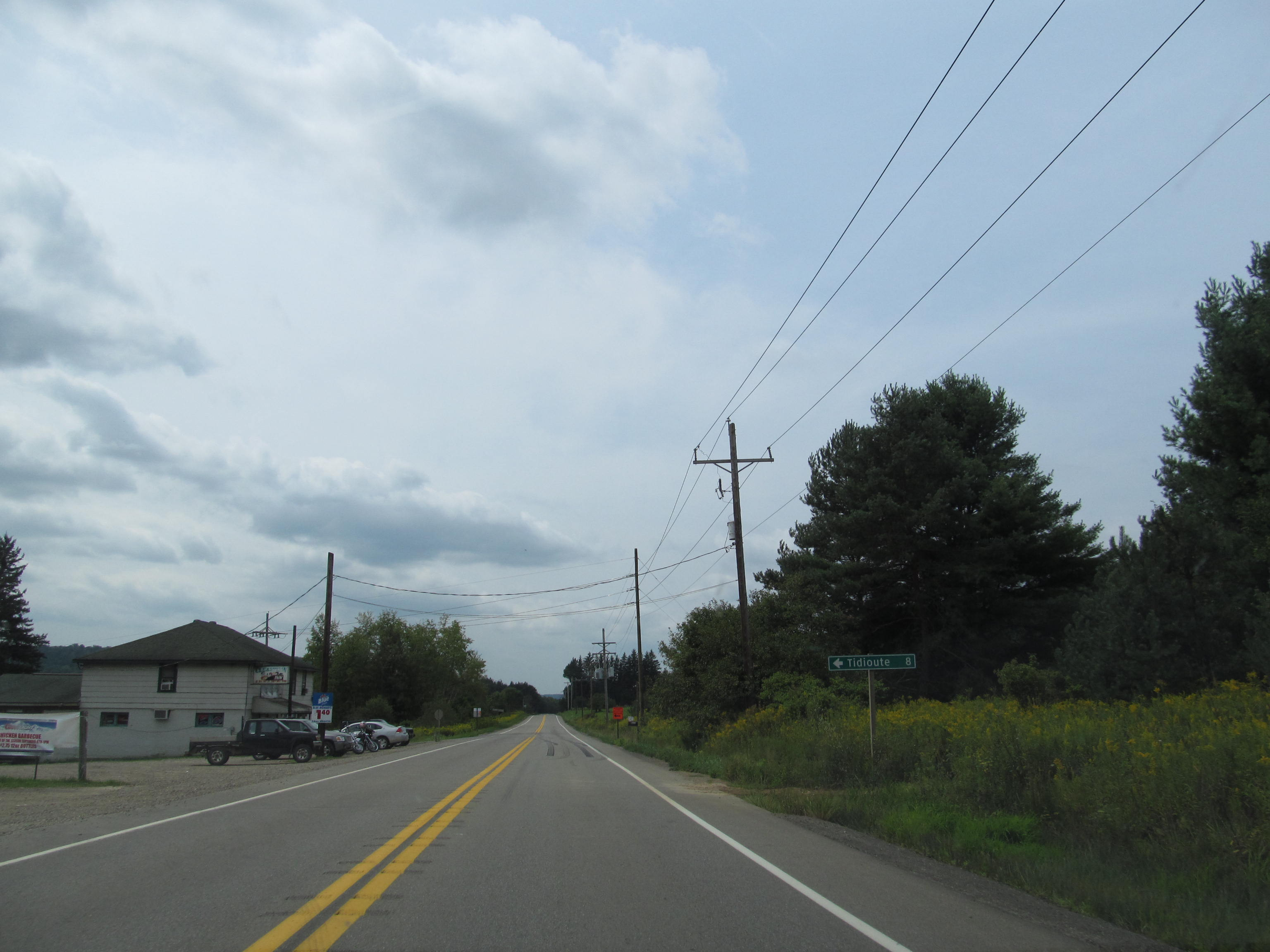
- PA 27 westbound in the northwestern corner of the township

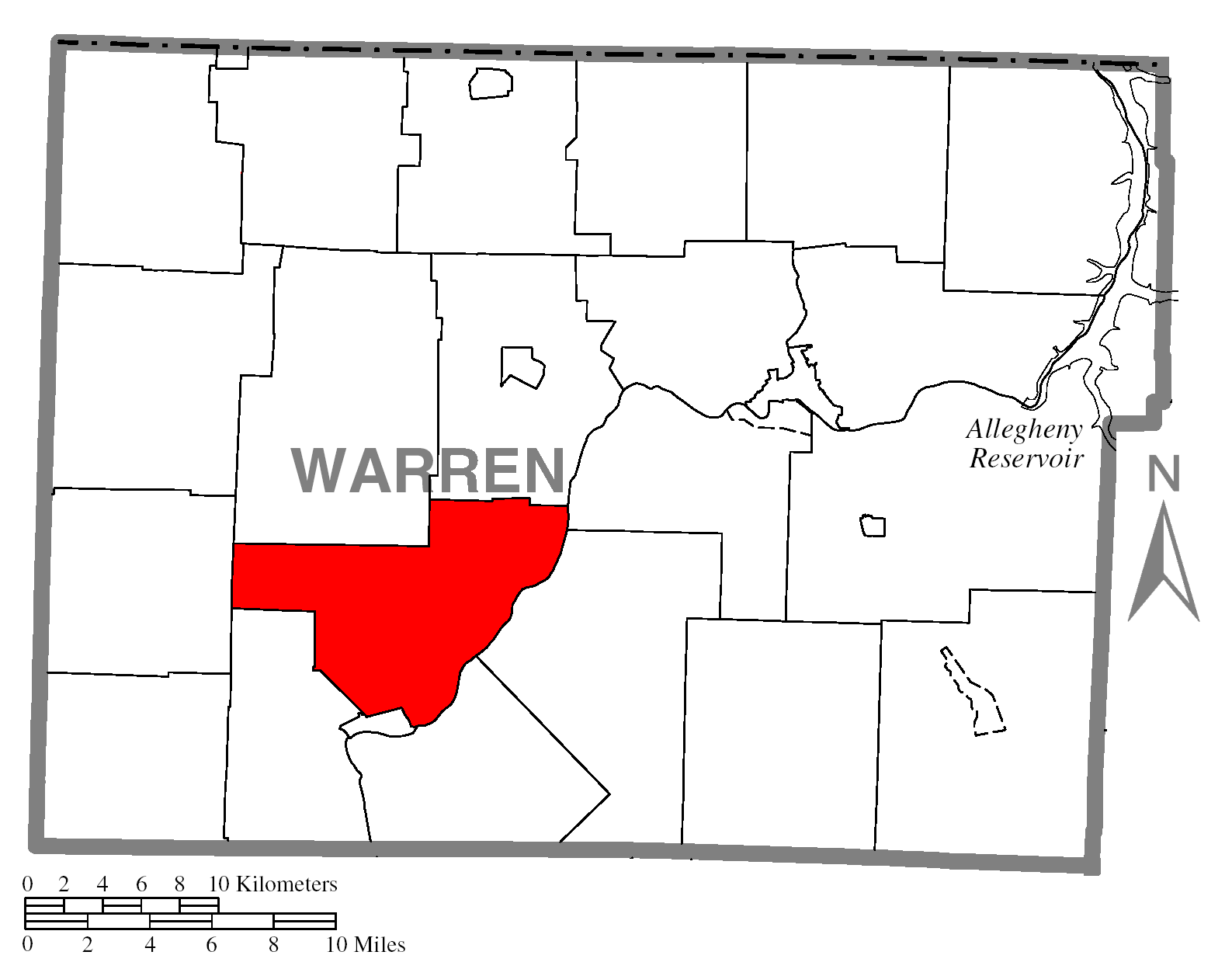
- Location of Deerfield Township in Warren County

- Location of Warren County in Pennsylvania
- Country: United States
- State: Pennsylvania
- County: Warren

Area
  - Total: 43.78 sq mi (113.40 km^{2})
  - Land: 43.22 sq mi (111.95 km^{2})
  - Water: 0.56 sq mi (1.45 km^{2})

Population (2020)
  - Total: 270
  - Estimate (2024): 257
  - Density: 7.5/sq mi (2.9/km^{2})
- Time zone: UTC-4 (EST)
  - Summer (DST): UTC-5 (EDT)
- Area code: 814
- FIPS code: 42-123-18560

Deerfield Township is a township in Warren County, Pennsylvania, United States. The population was 270 at the 2020 census, down from 339 at the 2010 census.

== Geography ==
According to the United States Census Bureau, the township has a total area of 43.4 square miles (112 km^{2}), of which 42.9 square miles (111 km^{2}) is land and 0.5 square miles (1.3 km^{2}) (1.08%) is water.

== Demographics ==
Historical population
Census	Pop.	Note	%±
2000	333		—
2010	339		1.8%
2020	270		−20.4%
2024 (est.)	257		−4.8%
U.S. Decennial Census

As of the census of 2000, there were 333 people, 156 households, and 102 families residing in the township. The population density was 7.8 people per square mile (3.0/km^{2}). There were 647 housing units at an average density of 15.1/sq mi (5.8/km^{2}). The racial makeup of the township was 99.70% White, and 0.30% from two or more races.

There were 156 households, out of which 19.9% had children under the age of 18 living with them, 59.6% were married couples living together, 2.6% had a female householder with no husband present, and 34.6% were non-families. For Deerfield Township, 32.1% of all households were made up of individuals, and 15.4% had someone living alone who was 65 years of age or older. The average household size was 2.13 and the average family size was 2.70.

In the township the population was spread out, with 16.2% under the age of 18, 3.6% from 18 to 24, 22.5% from 25 to 44, 36.0% from 45 to 64, and 21.6% who were 65 years of age or older. The median age was 50 years. For every 100 females, there were 119.1 males. For every 100 females age 18 and over, there were 126.8 males.

The median income for a household in the township was $30,781, and the median income for a family was $45,313. Males had a median income of $27,212 versus $21,042 for females. The per capita income for the township was $22,217. About 4.0% of families and 4.9% of the population were below the poverty line, including none of those under age 18 and 5.7% of those age 65 or over.
