= Sandycreek Township, Pennsylvania =

Township in Pennsylvania, US

Coordinates: 41°21′00″N 79°49′59″W

Sandycreek Township, Venango County, Pennsylvania
- Township
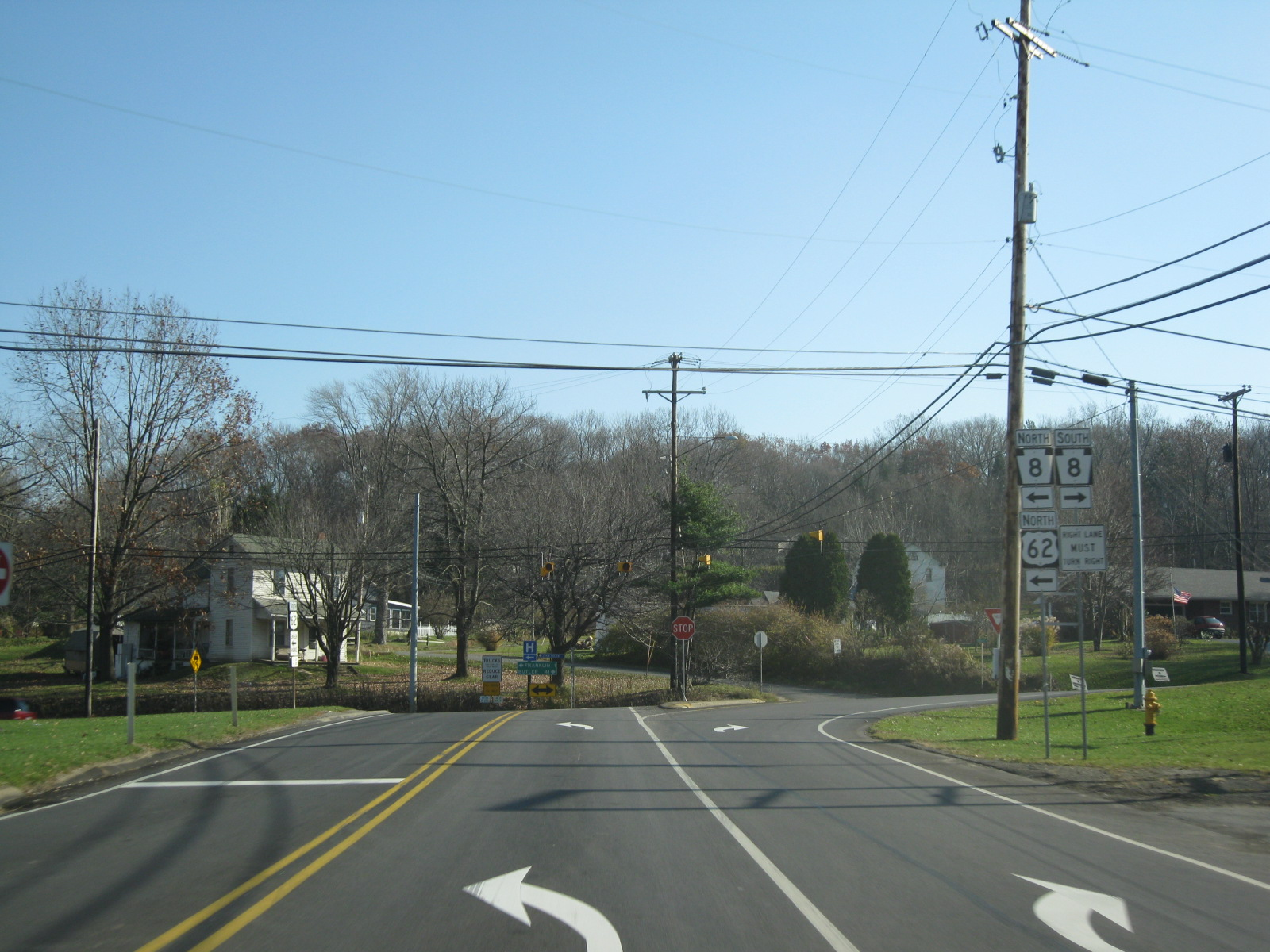
- Intersection of US 62 and PA 8 in the northern part of the township

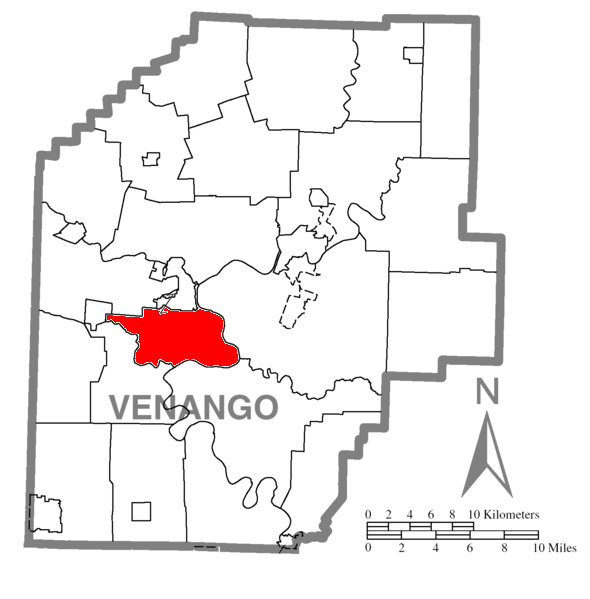
- Map of Venango County, Pennsylvania highlighting Sandycreek Township

- Map of Venango County, Pennsylvania
- Country: United States
- State: Pennsylvania
- County: Venango
- Settled: 1797
- Incorporated: 1806

Government
  - Type: Board of Supervisors

Area
  - Total: 19.09 sq mi (49.45 km^{2})
  - Land: 17.76 sq mi (46.01 km^{2})
  - Water: 1.33 sq mi (3.44 km^{2})

Population (2020)
  - Total: 2,061 ▼
  - Estimate (2024): 2,025
  - Density: 122.6/sq mi (47.32/km^{2})
- Time zone: UTC-5 (Eastern (EST))
  - Summer (DST): UTC-4 (EDT)
- Area code: 814
- FIPS code: 42-121-67824
- Website: https://sandycreektwp.org/

Sandycreek Township is a township that is located in Venango County, Pennsylvania, United States. The population was 2,061 at the time of the 2020 census.

== Geography ==
According to the United States Census Bureau, the township has a total area of 19.0 square miles (49.3 km^{2}), of which 17.8 square miles (46.1 km^{2}) is land and 1.2 square miles (3.2 km^{2}) (6.46%) is water.

== Demographics ==
Historical population
| Census | Pop. | Note | %± |
|---|---|---|---|
| 2010 | 2,260 | | — |
| 2020 | 2,061 | | −8.8% |
| 2024 (est.) | 2,025 | | −1.7% |
U.S. Decennial Census

As of the census of 2000, there were 2,406 people, 832 households, and 648 families residing in the township.

The population density was 135.1 inhabitants per square mile (52.2/km^{2}). There were 914 housing units at an average density of 51.3 per square mile (19.8/km^{2}).

The racial makeup of the township was 90.15% White, 6.86% African American, 0.25% Native American, 0.17% Asian, 0.04% Pacific Islander, 1.04% from other races, and 1.50% from two or more races. Hispanic or Latino of any race were 2.16% of the population.

There were 832 households, out of which 32.2% had children under the age of 18 living with them, 67.4% were married couples living together, 6.3% had a female householder with no husband present, and 22.1% were non-families. 19.0% of all households were made up of individuals, and 8.7% had someone living alone who was 65 years of age or older.

The average household size was 2.51 and the average family size was 2.84.

Within the township, the population was spread out, with 30.7% under the age of 18, 7.8% from 18 to 24, 21.7% from 25 to 44, 26.0% from 45 to 64, and 13.8% who were 65 years of age or older. The median age was 38 years.

For every 100 females, there were 119.9 males. For every 100 females age 18 and over, there were 107.5 males.

The median income for a household in the township was $46,723, and the median income for a family was $51,574. Males had a median income of $35,743 versus $27,500 for females.

The per capita income for the township was $22,165.

Approximately 3.9% of families and 5.0% of the population were living below the poverty line, including 6.0% of those under age 18 and 3.8% of those age 65 or over.
