= Victory Township, Pennsylvania =

Township in Pennsylvania, US

Coordinates: 41°18′00″N 79°51′59″W

- Township
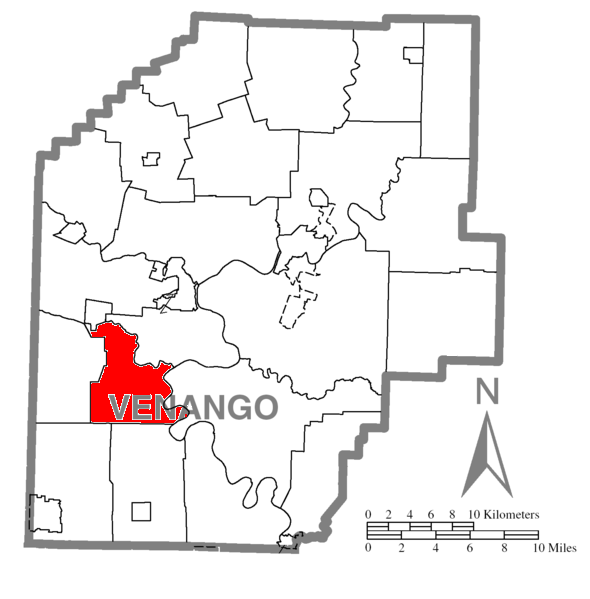
- Map of Venango County, Pennsylvania highlighting Victory Township

- Map of Venango County, Pennsylvania
- Country: United States
- State: Pennsylvania
- County: Venango
- Settled: 1796
- Incorporated: 1876

Government
  - Type: Board of Supervisors

Area
  - Total: 20.85 sq mi (54.00 km^{2})
  - Land: 20.12 sq mi (52.12 km^{2})
  - Water: 0.73 sq mi (1.88 km^{2})

Population (2020)
  - Total: 375 ▼
  - Estimate (2024): 373
  - Density: 19.3/sq mi (7.46/km^{2})
- Time zone: UTC-5 (Eastern (EST))
  - Summer (DST): UTC-4 (EDT)
- Area code: 814
- FIPS code: 42-121-80168

Victory Township is a township in Venango County, Pennsylvania, United States. As of the 2020 census, the township population was 375.

== Geography ==
According to the United States Census Bureau, the township has a total area of 20.5 square miles (53.2 km^{2}), of which 19.9 square miles (51.5 km^{2}) is land and 0.7 square mile (1.7 km^{2}) (3.26%) is water.

== Demographics ==
Historical population
Census	Pop.	Note	%±
2010	410		—
2020	375		−8.5%
2024 (est.)	373		−0.5%
U.S. Decennial Census

As of the census of 2000, there were 408 people, 162 households, and 120 families residing in the township. The population density was 20.5 people per square mile (7.9/km^{2}). There were 327 housing units at an average density of 16.5/sq mi (6.4/km^{2}). The racial makeup of the township was 98.28% White, 0.98% African American, and 0.74% from two or more races.

There were 162 households, out of which 35.8% had children under the age of 18 living with them, 62.3% were married couples living together, 6.8% had a female householder with no husband present, and 25.9% were non-families. 19.1% of all households were made up of individuals, and 7.4% had someone living alone who was 65 years of age or older. The average household size was 2.52 and the average family size was 2.91.

In the township the population was spread out, with 25.0% under the age of 18, 6.6% from 18 to 24, 27.5% from 25 to 44, 26.7% from 45 to 64, and 14.2% who were 65 years of age or older. The median age was 41 years. For every 100 females, there were 123.0 males. For every 100 females age 18 and over, there were 115.5 males.

The median income for a household in the township was $35,096, and the median income for a family was $42,589. Males had a median income of $34,375 versus $19,643 for females. The per capita income for the township was $15,156. About 5.2% of families and 9.0% of the population were below the poverty line, including 4.0% of those under age 18 and 11.9% of those age 65 or over.
