= Glade Township, Warren County, Pennsylvania =

Township in Pennsylvania, United States

Coordinates: 41°53′00″N 78°58′59″W

Glade Township
- Township
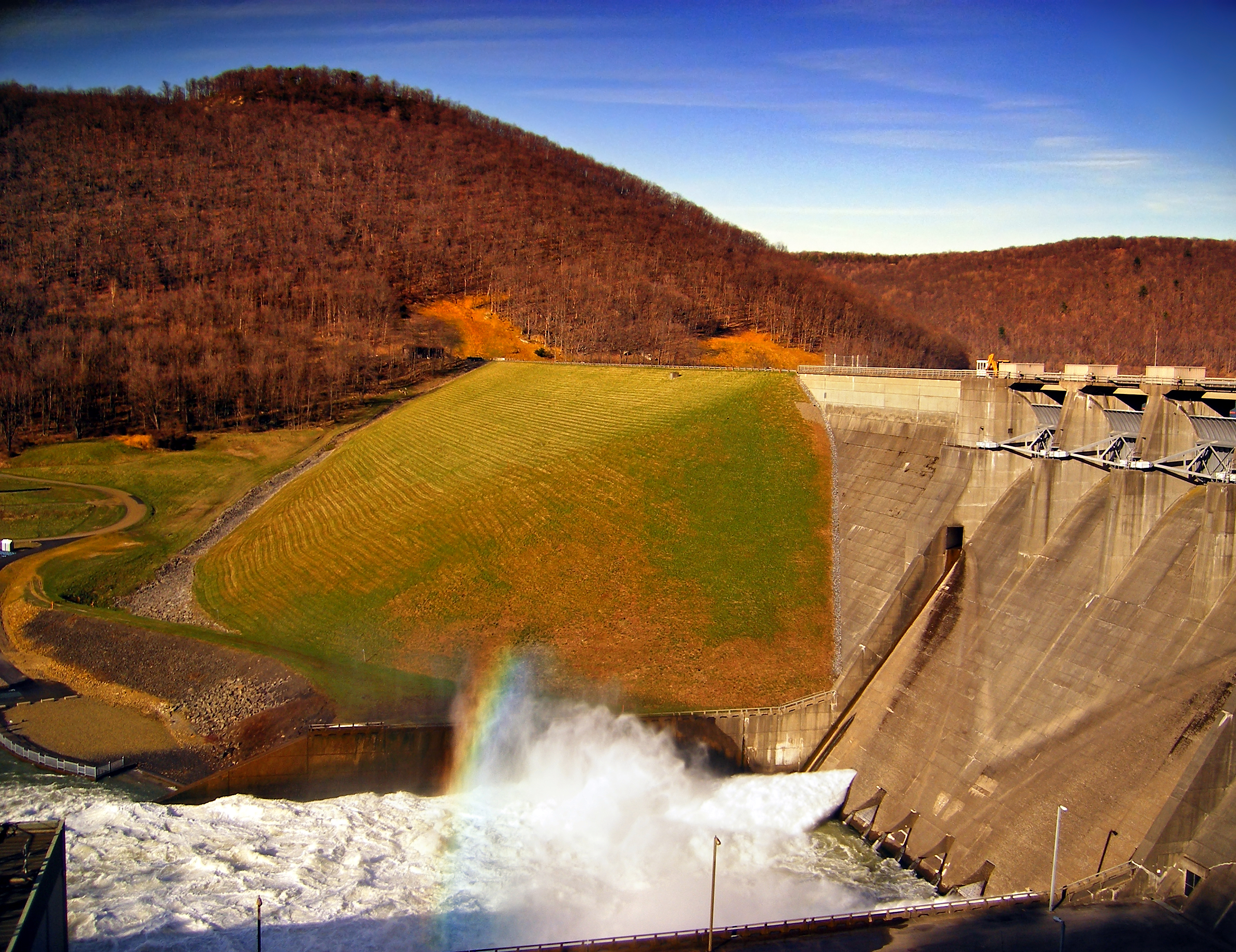
- Kinzua Dam

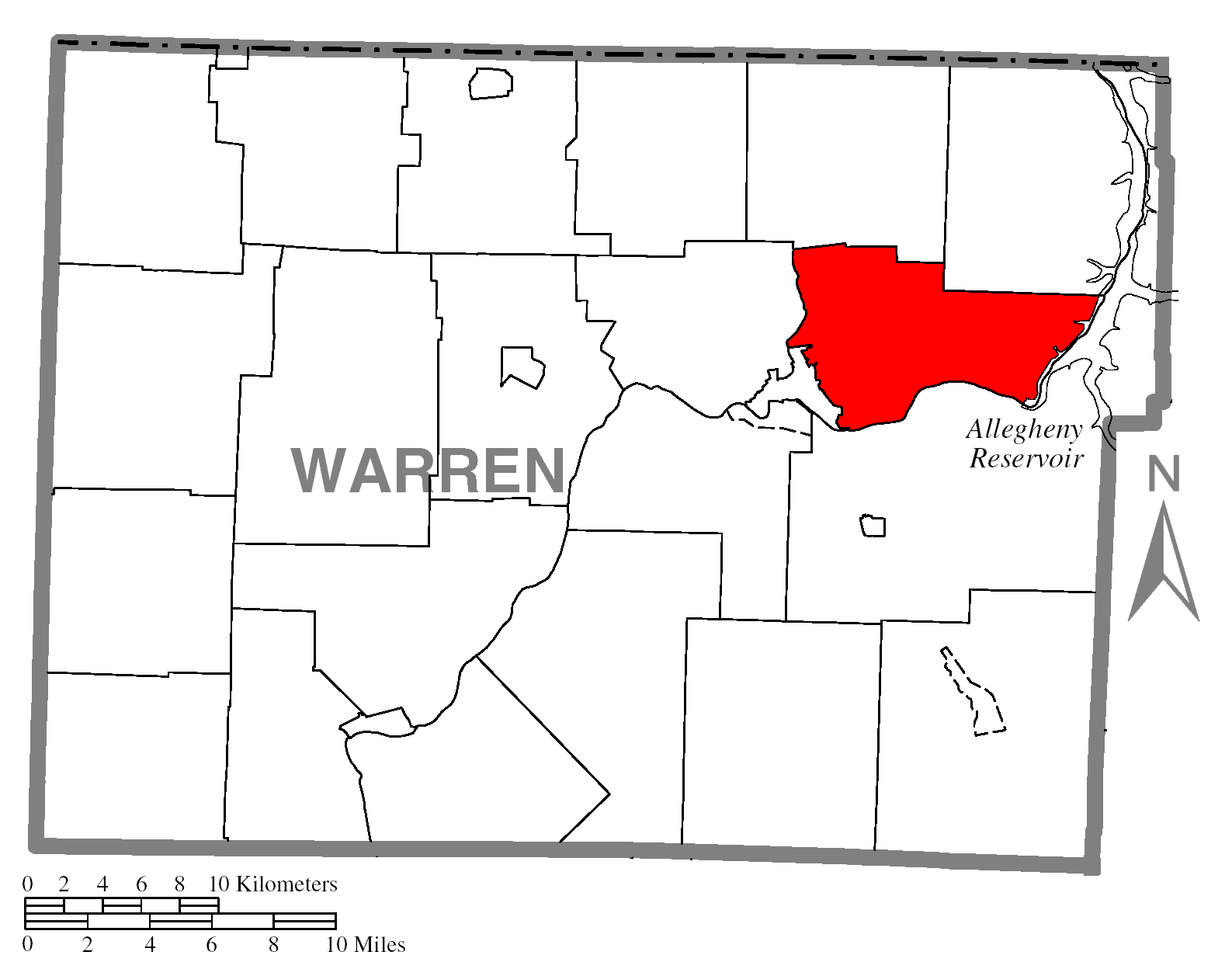
- Location of Glade Township in Warren County

- Location of Warren County in Pennsylvania
- Country: United States
- State: Pennsylvania
- County: Warren

Area
  - Total: 36.84 sq mi (95.41 km^{2})
  - Land: 36.02 sq mi (93.29 km^{2})
  - Water: 0.82 sq mi (2.12 km^{2})

Population (2020)
  - Total: 2,040
  - Estimate (2024): 1,975
  - Density: 62/sq mi (23.8/km^{2})
- Time zone: UTC-4 (EST)
  - Summer (DST): UTC-5 (EDT)
- Area code: 814
- FIPS code: 42-123-29328
- Website: https://gladetwp.org/

Glade Township is a township in Warren County, Pennsylvania, United States. According to the 2020 census, the population is 2,040, down from 2,308 in 2010 and 2,319 in 2000.

== Geography ==
According to the United States Census Bureau, the township has a total area of 36.3 square miles (94 km^{2}), of which 35.4 square miles (92 km^{2}) is land and 0.9 square miles (2.3 km^{2}) (2.51%) is water.

== Demographics ==
Historical population
Census	Pop.	Note	%±
2000	2,319		—
2010	2,308		−0.5%
2020	2,040		−11.6%
2024 (est.)	1,975		−3.2%
U.S. Decennial Census

According to the 2000 census, there were 2,319 people, 961 households and 686 families residing in the township. The population density was 65.5 per square mile (25.3/km^{2}). There were 1,071 housing units at an average density of 30.3 per square mile (11.7/km^{2}). The racial make-up was 98.58% White, 0.13% African American, 0.04% Native American, 0.91% Asian, 0.13% other races, and 0.21% Hispanic or Latino.

There were 961 households, of which 27.1% had children under the age of 18 living with them, 62.1% were married couples living together, 5.6% females with no husband, and 28.6% were non-families. 24.3% of all households were made up of individuals, and 10.1% had someone living alone who was 65 years of age or older. The average household size was 2.39 and the average family size was 2.84.

22.6% of the population were under the age of 18, 4.7% from 18 to 24, 25.4% from 25 to 44, 29.4% from 45 to 64, and 17.9% were 65 years of age or older. The average age was 44 years. For every 100 females, there were 98.7 males. For every 100 females age 18 and over, there were 96.8 males.

The average household income was $40,938 and the average family income was $55,667. Males had an average income of $38,472 and females $26,538. The per capita income was $24,839. About 1.7% of families and 3.8% of the population were below the poverty line, including 1.9% of those under age 18 and 6.6% of those age 65 or over.
