= East Sandy Creek =

Location
- Country: United States
- State: Pennsylvania

Physical characteristics
- Source
  - coordinates: 41°21′04″N 79°26′57″W
  - elevation: 1,620 feet (490 m)
- Mouth
  - location: Allegheny River
  - coordinates: 41°19′59″N 79°46′07″W
  - elevation: 942 feet (287 m)

Basin features
- River system: Allegheny River

East Sandy Creek is a tributary of the Allegheny River in Northwestern Pennsylvania in the United States.

East Sandy Creek joins the Allegheny River approximately 5 miles (8 km) downstream of Franklin.

The East Sandy Creek Rapids are rated for paddlers with a usual difficulty of I-II (for normal flows).

== Political subdivisions ==
The political subdivisions traverses, given in the order they are encountered traveling downstream, are as follows:

- Washington Township
- Elk Township
- Pinegrove Township
- Ashland Township
- Cranberry Township
- Rockland Township

== Tributaries ==
The named tributaries of East Sandy Creek, given in the order they are encountered traveling downstream, are as follows:

- Richland Run
- Prairie Run
- Cogley Run
- Little East Sandy Creek
- Tarkiln Run
- Pine Run
- Shaw Run
- Shannon Run
- Pryor Run
- Halls Run
- Browns Run
- Porcupine Run
- Burford Run

== See also ==
- Tributaries of the Allegheny River#East Sandy Creek
- List of rivers of Pennsylvania
