= Deanville, Pennsylvania =

Unincorporated community in Pennsylvania, US

- Unincorporated community
- Location within Pennsylvania
- Coordinates: 40°57′00″N 79°23′54″W
- Country: United States
- State: Pennsylvania
- County: Armstrong
- Township: Madison
- Elevation: 1,273 ft (388 m)
- Time zone: UTC-5 (Eastern (EST))
  - Summer (DST): UTC-4 (EDT)
- GNIS feature ID: 1173035

Deanville is an unincorporated community in the extreme eastern end of Madison Township, Armstrong County, Pennsylvania, United States.

== History ==
Deanville was originally called Centerville as shown on the township map of 1876. A post office called Deanville after Rev. J. F. Dean was established on August 3, 1877, by Isaac E. Shoemaker, postmaster. It remained in operation until 1907. Before the establishment of Deanville Post Office, mail was brought to Isaac E. Shoemaker's store, shown on the 1876 township map as "Private P.O."

Prior to the establishment of Deanville P.O., the town was called Centerville because its position is about central on one of the routes between Kellersburg in Madison township and Oakland in Mahoning township.
