= Oakland, Pennsylvania =

Oakland is the name of some locations in the U.S. state of Pennsylvania:

- Oakland (Pittsburgh), a neighborhood in Pittsburgh, Pennsylvania
- Oakland, Cambria County, Pennsylvania
- Oakland, Lawrence County, Pennsylvania
- Oakland, Susquehanna County, Pennsylvania
- Former name of Distant, Pennsylvania

== See also ==
- Oakland Township, Pennsylvania (disambiguation)
