= Boggs Township, Pennsylvania =

Boggs Township is the name of some places in the U.S. state of Pennsylvania:

- Boggs Township, Armstrong County, Pennsylvania
- Boggs Township, Centre County, Pennsylvania
- Boggs Township, Clearfield County, Pennsylvania
