= West Valley =

West Valley may refer to:

- West Valley (California), a geographical area of Santa Clara County
- West Valley (Phoenix metropolitan area), a geographical area of the Phoenix metropolitan area
- West Valley, New York
- West Valley, Pennsylvania, an unincorporated community
- West Valley, Washington, a census-designated place in Yakima County
- West Valley City, Utah, in Salt Lake County
  - West Valley Central, Utah Transit Authority Intermodal Transit Hub
- West Valley College, in Saratoga, California
- West Valley Demonstration Project, in New York
- West Valley Township, Minnesota, a township in Marshall County
- The western section of the Valley of the Kings in Egypt
- West Valley Fault, part of the Marikina Valley Fault System

== See also ==
- State Route 85 (California), also known as "West Valley Freeway"
