= Slabtown, Armstrong County, Pennsylvania =

Unincorporated community in Pennsylvania, US

Slabtown, Pennsylvania
- Unincorporated community
- Location within Pennsylvania
- Coordinates: 40°52′39″N 79°23′39″W
- Country: United States
- State: Pennsylvania
- County: Armstrong
- Township: Boggs
- Elevation: 1,096 ft (334 m)
- Time zone: UTC-5 (Eastern (EST))
  - Summer (DST): UTC-4 (EDT)
- GNIS feature ID: 1187776

Slabtown is an unincorporated community in Boggs Township, Armstrong County, Pennsylvania, United States. It has also been known as Baum. The community is 9.1 miles (14.6 km) north of Kittanning along Pennsylvania Route 28-Pennsylvania Route 66.
