= Goheenville, Pennsylvania =

- Unincorporated community
- Location within Pennsylvania
- Coordinates: 40°54′24″N 79°22′19″W
- Country: United States
- State: Pennsylvania
- County: Armstrong
- Township: Boggs
- Elevation: 1,089 ft (332 m)
- Time zone: UTC-5 (Eastern (EST))
  - Summer (DST): UTC-4 (EDT)
- ZIP code: 16259
- GNIS feature ID: 1175777

Goheenville is an unincorporated community in Boggs Township, Armstrong County, Pennsylvania, United States. The community is located 7.7 miles (12.4 km) south of New Bethlehem via PA 66 and 12.0 miles (19.3 km) north of Kittanning.

== History ==
Goheenville began as a hamlet in the forks of the head branches of Scrub Grass Creek where, in 1840, George W. Goheen erected a grist mill and two saw mills; which were assessed the next year (1851) at $500, with a new house in 1852, and as a merchant in 1857. Soon afterwards Goheenville contained a public schoolhouse, a store, physician's office, three mills, blacksmith shop and a few dwelling-houses. A business directory of Pine Township includes: Goheen, G. W., Dealer in Dry Goods, Groceries, Boots, &c. P. O. Goheenville.

Scrub Grass post office was established about a mile and a quarter northeast of this point in the summer of 1844, Wm. J. Calhoun, postmaster. It was later relocated to Goheenville about 1850 and, on June 20, 1866, its name was changed to Goheenville with George W. Goheen being the second postmaster. It remained in operation until 1905. Goheenville P.O. appears in the 1876 Atlas of Armstrong County, Pennsylvania.
