= Mount Tabor, Armstrong County, Pennsylvania =

Mount Tabor, Pennsylvania
- Unincorporated community
- Location within Pennsylvania
- Coordinates: 40°59′15″N 79°13′03″W
- Country: United States
- State: Pennsylvania
- County: Armstrong
- Township: Redbank
- Elevation: 1,621 ft (494 m)
- Time zone: UTC-5 (Eastern (EST))
  - Summer (DST): UTC-4 (EDT)
- Area code: 814
- GNIS feature ID: 1204231

Mount Tabor is an unincorporated community in Redbank Township, Armstrong County, Pennsylvania, United States. Mount Tabor Cemetery is located nearby at 40°59′11″N 79°13′02″W. The community, once knowns as Dry Ridge, is situated 1.7 miles (2.7 km) east of New Salem at the intersection of Pete Schicks Road with Dry Ridge Road. Dry Ridge school was located nearby at 40°58′38″N 79°13′11″W

== History ==
A post office called Mount Tabor was established in 1883 and closed that same year. The 1876 Atlas of Armstrong County, Pennsylvania shows a store at the location of Mount Tabor. The residents at that time were John C Shaffer, L. C. Shaffer, C. Shaffer, W. Harmon, and R. R. Miller.
