= McGrann, Pennsylvania =

Unincorporated community in Pennsylvania, US

- Unincorporated community
- Location within Pennsylvania
- Coordinates: 40°46′53″N 79°31′17″W
- Country: United States
- State: Pennsylvania
- County: Armstrong
- Township: Manor
- Elevation: 797 ft (243 m)
- Time zone: UTC-5 (Eastern (EST))
  - Summer (DST): UTC-4 (EDT)
- ZIP code: 16236
- Area code: 724
- GNIS feature ID: 1192912

McGrann is an unincorporated community in Armstrong County, Pennsylvania, United States. The community is bounded by Manorville to the northwest, Ford City to the southwest, and Pennsylvania Route 66 to the east. McGrann has a post office with ZIP code 16236, which opened on July 19, 1898.
