= Manorville =

Manorville may refer to:

- Manorville, New York, United States
- Manorville, Pennsylvania, United States
