= Cogley Island =

Alluvial island in Pennsylvania, U.S.

Coordinates: 40°46′55″N 79°31′40″W

Cogley Island is an alluvial island in the Allegheny River in North Buffalo Township, Armstrong County in the U.S. state of Pennsylvania. The island is situated across from Ford City and Manorville boroughs.

The elevation of Cogley Island is 768 feet above sea level.
