= Oak Ridge, Armstrong County, Pennsylvania =

Unincorporated community in Pennsylvania, US

Oak Ridge, Pennsylvania
- Unincorporated community
- Location within Pennsylvania
- Coordinates: 41°00′27″N 79°17′45″W
- Country: United States
- State: Pennsylvania
- County: Armstrong
- Township: Redbank
- Elevation: 1,096 ft (334 m)
- Time zone: UTC-5 (Eastern (EST))
  - Summer (DST): UTC-4 (EDT)
- ZIP code: 16245
- Area code: 814
- GNIS feature ID: 1193058

Oak Ridge is an unincorporated community in Armstrong County, Pennsylvania, United States. The community is located on the south bank of Redbank Creek between Hawthorn and New Bethlehem. Oak Ridge has a post office, with ZIP code 16245.
