= West Kittanning, Pennsylvania =

Borough in Pennsylvania, US

- Borough
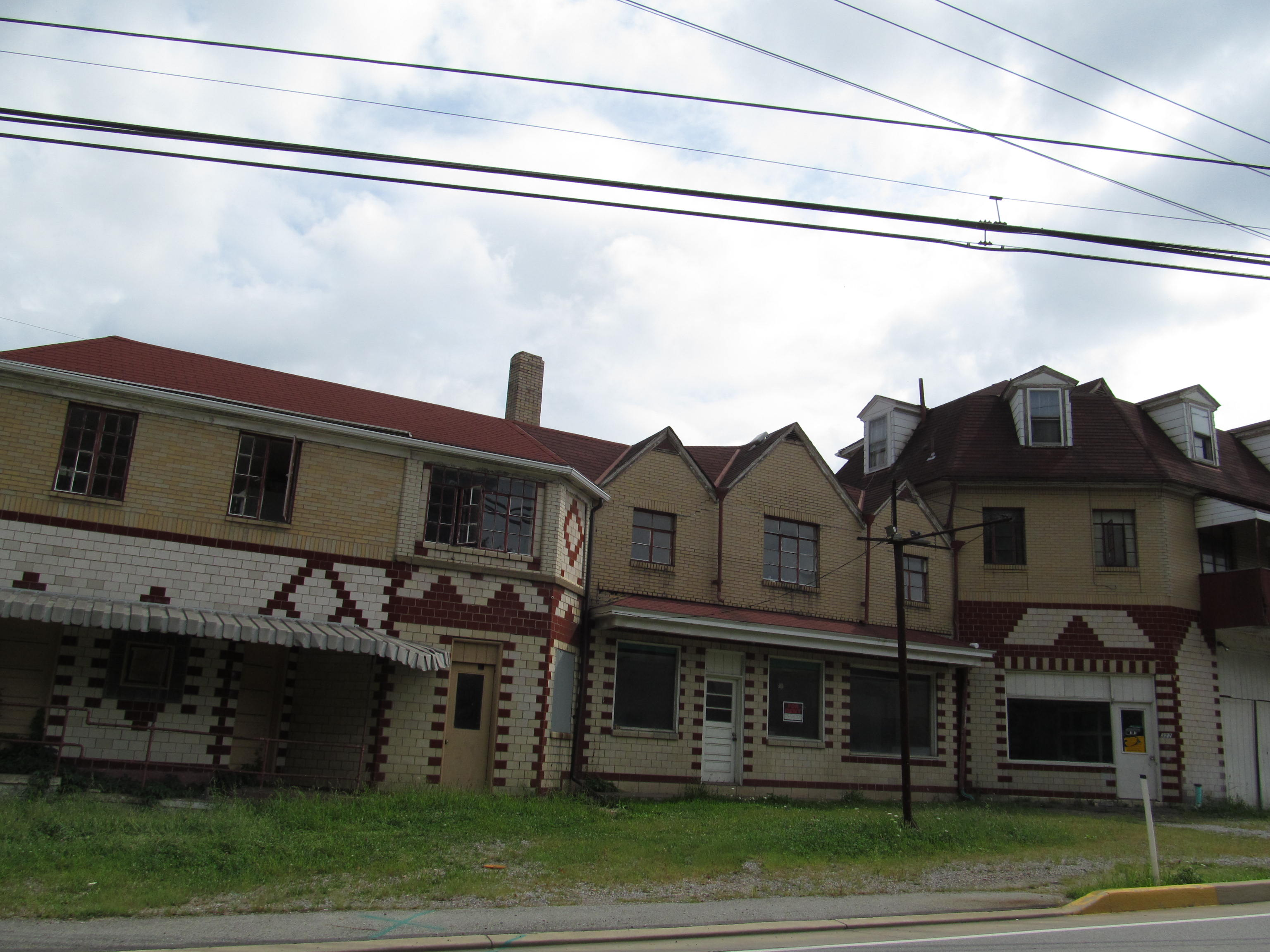

- Location of West Kittanning in Armstrong County, Pennsylvania.

- Location within Pennsylvania
- Coordinates: 40°48′44″N 79°31′48″W
- Country: United States
- State: Pennsylvania
- County: Armstrong
- Settled: 1855
- Incorporated: 1900

Government
  - Type: Council-Mayor
  - Mayor: Bernie Bowser Jr.

Area
  - Total: 0.43 sq mi (1.11 km^{2})
  - Land: 0.43 sq mi (1.11 km^{2})
  - Water: 0 sq mi (0.00 km^{2})
- Elevation: 1,020 ft (310 m)

Population (2020)
  - Total: 1,192
  - Density: 2,781.7/sq mi (1,074.01/km^{2})
- Time zone: UTC-5 (Eastern (EST))
  - Summer (DST): UTC-4 (EDT)
- Zip code: 16201
- Area code: 724
- FIPS code: 42-83248
- Website: www.westkittanningpa.com

West Kittanning is a borough in Armstrong County, Pennsylvania, United States. The population was 1,192 at the 2020 census.

== Geography ==
West Kittanning is located on a hilltop overlooking the Allegheny River at 40°48′44″N 79°31′48″W (40.812210, −79.529949), approximately 40 miles (64 km) northeast of Pittsburgh. It is bordered by the borough of Applewold at the base of the hill to the east. Kittanning, the county seat, lies across the river to the northeast.

According to the United States Census Bureau, the borough has a total area of 0.42 square miles (1.1 km^{2}), all land.

== Demographics ==
Historical population
Census	Pop.	Note	%±
1910	589		—
1920	861		46.2%
1930	1,005		16.7%
1940	1,005		0.0%
1950	910		−9.5%
1960	1,101		21.0%
1970	956		−13.2%
1980	1,591		66.4%
1990	1,253		−21.2%
2000	1,199		−4.3%
2010	1,175		−2.0%
2020	1,192		1.4%
U.S. Decennial Census

As of the 2000 census, there were 1,199 people, 544 households, and 354 families residing in the borough. The population density was 3,029.6 inhabitants per square mile (1,169.7/km^{2}). There were 572 housing units at an average density of 1,445.3 per square mile (558.0/km^{2}). The racial makeup of the borough was 98.92% White, 0.08% Asian, 0.17% from other races, and 0.83% from two or more races. Hispanic or Latino of any race were 0.67% of the population.

There were 544 households, out of which 24.6% had children under the age of 18 living with them, 53.5% were married couples living together, 8.8% had a female householder with no husband present, and 34.9% were non-families. 32.2% of all households were made up of individuals, and 21.0% had someone living alone who was 65 years of age or older. The average household size was 2.20 and the average family size was 2.75.

The borough median age of 42 years was more than the county median age of 40 years. The distribution by age group was 20.2% under the age of 18, 6.3% from 18 to 24, 27.8% from 25 to 44, 20.3% from 45 to 64, and 25.4% who were 65 years of age or older. The median age was 42 years. For every 100 females, there were 87.1 males. For every 100 females age 18 and over, there were 80.2 males.

The median income for a household in the borough was $32,850, and the median income for a family was $41,458. Males had a median income of $31,587 versus $22,708 for females. The per capita income for the borough was $18,112. About 6.0% of families and 7.5% of the population were below the poverty line, including 14.5% of those under age 18 and 0.7% of those age 65 or over.

== Education ==
All students in the West Kittanning attendance area attend the Armstrong School District. Currently, no Armstrong School District schools are located within West Kittanning.
