= Greendale, Pennsylvania =

- Unincorporated community
- Location within Pennsylvania
- Coordinates: 40°48′19″N 79°23′13″W
- Country: United States
- State: Pennsylvania
- County: Armstrong
- Township: Valley
- Elevation: 1,066 ft (325 m)
- Time zone: UTC-5 (Eastern (EST))
  - Summer (DST): UTC-4 (EDT)
- GNIS feature ID: 1176143

Greendale is an unincorporated community in Valley Township, Armstrong County, Pennsylvania, United States.

== History ==
A post office called Greendale was established in 1867. It remained in operation until 1905. Greendale P.O. appears in the 1876 Atlas of Armstrong County, Pennsylvania.
