= Spring Church, Pennsylvania =

Unincorporated community in Pennsylvania, US

- Unincorporated community
- Location within Pennsylvania
- Coordinates: 40°36′22″N 79°29′20″W
- Country: United States
- State: Pennsylvania
- County: Armstrong
- Elevation: 1,407 ft (429 m)
- Time zone: UTC-5 (Eastern (EST))
  - Summer (DST): UTC-4 (EDT)
- ZIP code: 15686
- Area codes: 724, 878
- GNIS feature ID: 1188210

Spring Church is an unincorporated community in Armstrong County, Pennsylvania, United States. The community is located along Pennsylvania Route 56, 4.4 miles (7.1 km) east-northeast of Apollo. Spring Church has a post office, with ZIP code 15686.

== Demographics ==
Historical population
Census	Pop.	Note	%±

The United States Census Bureau defined Spring Church as a census designated place (CDP) in 2023.
