= Mahoning Furnace, Pennsylvania =

Unincorporated community in Pennsylvania, US

- Unincorporated community
- Location within Pennsylvania
- Coordinates: 40°56′45″N 79°21′51″W
- Country: United States
- State: Pennsylvania
- County: Armstrong
- Township: Mahoning
- Elevation: 879 ft (268 m)
- Time zone: UTC-5 (Eastern (EST))
  - Summer (DST): UTC-4 (EDT)
- GNIS feature ID: 1200799

Mahoning Furnace is an unincorporated community in Mahoning Township, Armstrong County, Pennsylvania, United States. The community is located on Pennsylvania Route 28, south-southwest of New Bethlehem near Mahoning creek.

== History ==
Mahoning Furnace is the location where a steam, cold-blast, charcoal furnace was erected by Alexander and John A. Colwell in the summer of 1845. A post office called Mahoning Furnace was established in 1877 and remained in operation until 1886.
