= Clinton, Armstrong County, Pennsylvania =

Unincorporated community in Pennsylvania, US

Clinton, Pennsylvania
- Census-designated place
- Location within Pennsylvania
- Coordinates: 40°42′23″N 79°35′11″W
- Country: United States
- State: Pennsylvania
- County: Armstrong
- Township: South Buffalo
- Elevation: 794 ft (242 m)
- Time zone: UTC-5 (Eastern (EST))
  - Summer (DST): UTC-4 (EDT)
- GNIS feature ID: 1172013

Clinton is a census-designated place in South Buffalo Township Township, Armstrong County, Pennsylvania, United States. The community is 8.3 miles (13.4 km) northeast of Freeport.

== History ==
Clinton was founded in a deep southeastern bend of the Allegheny River by Enos McBride as 75 lots which were surveyed in July, 1830. Water street, about 80 feet wide, extended the whole length of the town along the river. Washington, Franklin, Jackson, Olinda, and Liberty streets, whose courses are from east to west, are intersected at right angles by First, Second and Third streets, each 60 feet wide, which run north to south. The 24 upper lots appear like a separate plat, and are traversed by Fourth and Fifth streets, whose bearing is northwest, which are intersected by two unnamed streets, one now named River Road, whose bearing is northeast, each 40 feet wide. The lots and streets cover an area of about 29 acres.

McBride sold most if not all of his lots, though deeds for only a few of them are on record. The first separate assessment list was in 1834, which included lots from No. 1 to 60 inclusive, assessed to almost as many persons, of which only eleven are noted as improved. The following sales show the prices of the lots in various parts of the town: On June 27, 1832, McBride conveyed to James Stewart, lot No. 9, fronting on Washington, Franklin, Second streets, for $60; to Johnathan Porter, No. 28, fronting on Jackson and Olinda streets, between Second and Third, for $15; to Patrick Sherry, Nos. 35 and 37, fronting on Olinda and Liberty, between First and Second streets, for $11 and $10. On the 29th to Joseph Kenniston, No. 49, fronting on Water, Fourth and one of the unnamed streets, for $16. On the 14th of July to William W. Gibson No. 4, fronting on Water and Washington, between First and Second streets, for $20; on January 23, 1838, to Samuel Walker, No. 18, fronting on Franklin, Jackson and Second streets, for $24.

Clinton appears in the 1876 Atlas of Armstrong County, Pennsylvania.

== Demographics ==
Historical population
Census	Pop.	Note	%±
2023 (est.)	98

The United States Census Bureau defined Clinton as a census designated place in 2023.
