= Pine Furnace, Armstrong County, Pennsylvania =

Pine Furnace, Pennsylvania
- Unincorporated community
- Location within Pennsylvania
- Coordinates: 40°51′13″N 79°25′45″W
- Country: United States
- State: Pennsylvania
- County: Armstrong
- Township: Valley
- Elevation: 945 ft (288 m)
- Time zone: UTC-5 (Eastern (EST))
  - Summer (DST): UTC-4 (EDT)
- GNIS feature ID: 1204396

Pine Furnace is an unincorporated community in Valley Township, Armstrong County, Pennsylvania, United States.

== History ==
In 1845 or 1846, James E. Brown and James Mosgrove erected Pine Creek Furnace in the east end of the part of Pine township north of Pine creek. It was a hotblast, steam charcoal furnace, ten feet across the bosh-stack and thirty-three feet high. It made its first pig-metal in July, 1846. It used charcoal until 1863, when the height of the stack was increased to forty feet and the fixtures were improved; and then commenced making iron with coke in 1865. The capacity of the furnace was fifty-six tons of forge metal out of limestone ore from beds in the coal measures for miles around.

In 1869 Brown & Mosgrove built a three-foot gauge railroad from the north of Pine creek to the furnace, a distance of four miles, for transporting ore and metal from and to the Allegheny Valley Railroad, which proved to be very successful. It is designated on the township map the Pine Creek & Dayton Railroad, so named because the people of the borough of Dayton and of the valley of Pine creek, had evinced considerable interest in its extension to Dayton, but without having secured the requisite pecuniary means. Subscriptions reaching $30,000, one-half the required amount, were made for this purpose in 1871.

A post office called Pine Creek Furnace was established in 1872. It remained in operation until 1882. Pine Creek Furnace P.O. appears in the 1876 Atlas of Armstrong County, Pennsylvania.
