= Rimer, Armstrong County, Pennsylvania =

Unincorporated community in Pennsylvania, US

Rimer, Pennsylvania
- Unincorporated community
- Location within Pennsylvania
- Coordinates: 40°56′10″N 79°31′31″W
- Country: United States
- State: Pennsylvania
- County: Armstrong
- Township: Madison
- Elevation: 846 ft (258 m)
- Time zone: UTC-5 (Eastern (EST))
  - Summer (DST): UTC-4 (EDT)
- GNIS feature ID: 1185087

Rimer is an unincorporated community in Madison Township, Armstrong County, Pennsylvania, United States. It has also been called Rimerton and Rimerton Station.

== History ==
A post office called Rimer was established in 1868, with John Rimer as postmaster. It remained in operation until 1951. Rimerton Station and Rimer P.O. appear in the 1876 Atlas of Armstrong County, Pennsylvania. Frank Mast, who kept a store, was postmaster in 1913.

Rimerton was first assessed in 1867, when there were 19 taxables, one innkeeper, one merchant, and one laborer. The real estate valuation was $2,229, personal, $44, and the occupations, $150. In 1880, there was no increase in the population or extent of the town. Rev. B. B. Killikelly preached there in 1853. In 1913, the town consisted of twelve houses, a hotel, kept by C. J. Zeis, and two stores, of which G. W. Clouse & Co. and Frank Mast were the proprietors. A station of the Pennsylvania Railroad was located there in 1913.
