= Ford Cliff, Pennsylvania =

Borough in Pennsylvania, US

- Borough
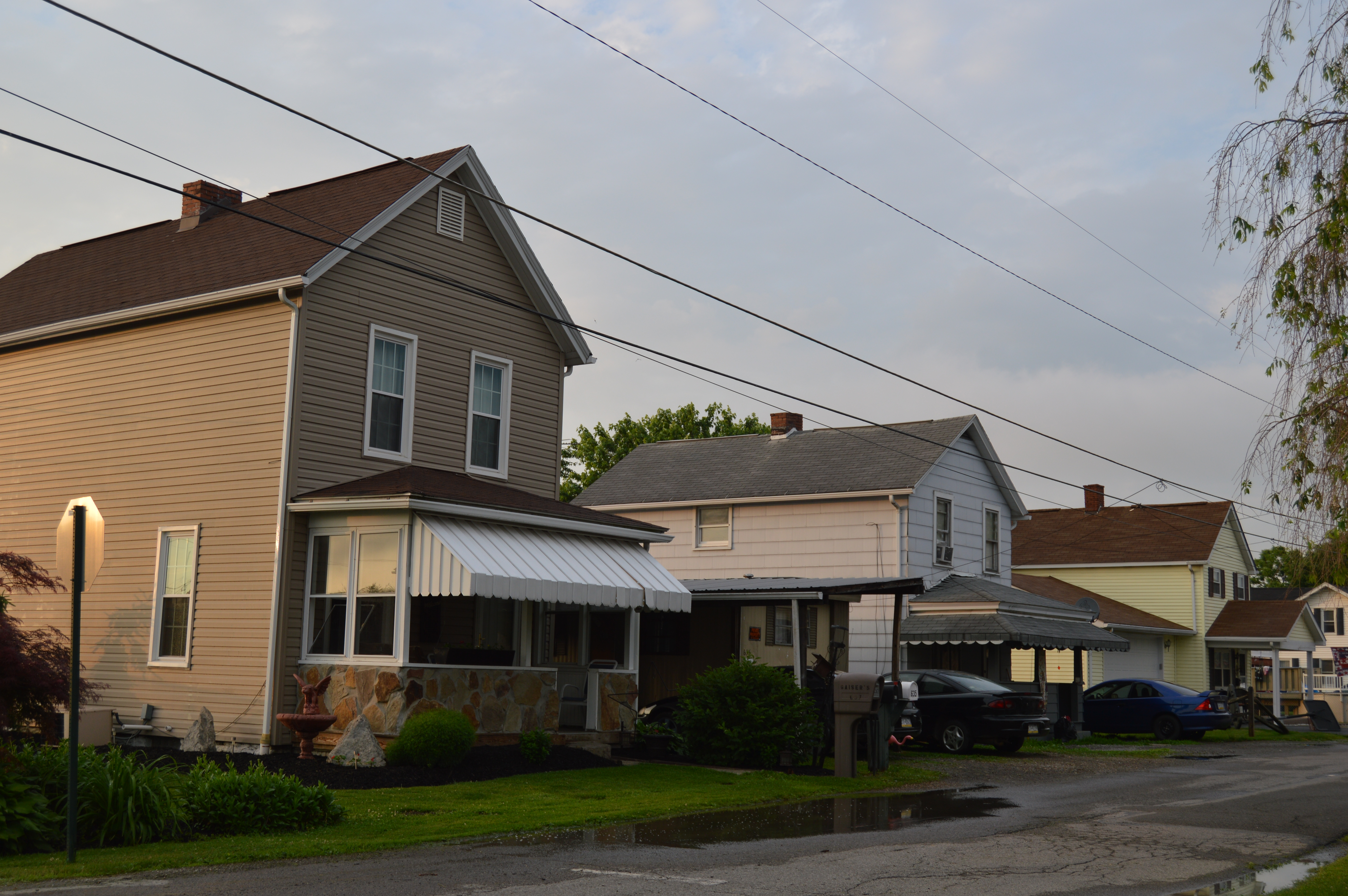
- Houses on Dewey Street

- Location of Ford Cliff in Armstrong County, Pennsylvania.

- Location within Pennsylvania
- Coordinates: 40°45′36″N 79°32′11″W
- Country: United States
- State: Pennsylvania
- County: Armstrong
- Incorporated: 1922

Government
  - Type: Borough Council

Area
  - Total: 0.077 sq mi (0.20 km^{2})
  - Land: 0.077 sq mi (0.20 km^{2})
  - Water: 0 sq mi (0.00 km^{2})
- Elevation: 960 ft (290 m)

Population (2020)
  - Total: 361
  - Density: 4,750/sq mi (1,834/km^{2})
- Time zone: UTC-5 (Eastern (EST))
  - Summer (DST): UTC-4 (EDT)
- Zip code: 16228
- FIPS code: 42-26520

Ford Cliff is a borough in Armstrong County, Pennsylvania, United States. The population was 361 at the 2020 census.

== Geography ==
Ford Cliff is located at 40°45′36″N 79°32′11″W, on a bluff overlooking the borough of Ford City. It is in the Allegheny River valley, about 40 miles (64 km) northeast of Pittsburgh. Both Ford Cliff and Ford City were founded by John B. Ford.

According to the United States Census Bureau, Ford Cliff has a total area of 0.077 square miles (0.2 km^{2}), all land.

== Demographics ==
Historical population
Census	Pop.	Note	%±
1930	607		—
1940	585		−3.6%
1950	597		2.1%
1960	590		−1.2%
1970	526		−10.8%
1980	516		−1.9%
1990	450		−12.8%
2000	412		−8.4%
2010	371		−10.0%
2020	361		−2.7%

At the 2000 census, there were 412 people, 181 households, and 129 families in the borough. The population density was 5,967.3 inhabitants per square mile (2,304.0/km^{2}). There were 184 housing units at an average density of 2,665.0 per square mile (1,029.0/km^{2}). The racial makeup of the borough was 99.76% White and 0.24% African American. Hispanic or Latino of any race were 0.73%.

There were 181 households, 23.2% had children under the age of 18 living with them, 54.7% were married couples living together, 11.0% had a female householder with no husband present, and 28.7% were non-families. 27.6% of households were made up of individuals, and 17.7% were one person aged 65 or older. The average household size was 2.28 and the average family size was 2.74.

The age distribution was 19.4% under the age of 18, 7.3% from 18 to 24, 28.2% from 25 to 44, 22.6% from 45 to 64, and 22.6% 65 or older. The median age was 43 years. For every 100 females there were 83.9 males. For every 100 females age 18 and over, there were 81.4 males.

The median household income was $31,250 and the median family income was $34,375. Males had a median income of $31,250 versus $22,500 for females. The per capita income for the borough was $17,568. About 9.0% of families and 8.7% of the population were below the poverty line, including 7.1% of those under age 18 and 11.9% of those age 65 or over.
