= Applewold, Pennsylvania =

Borough in Pennsylvania, US

- Borough
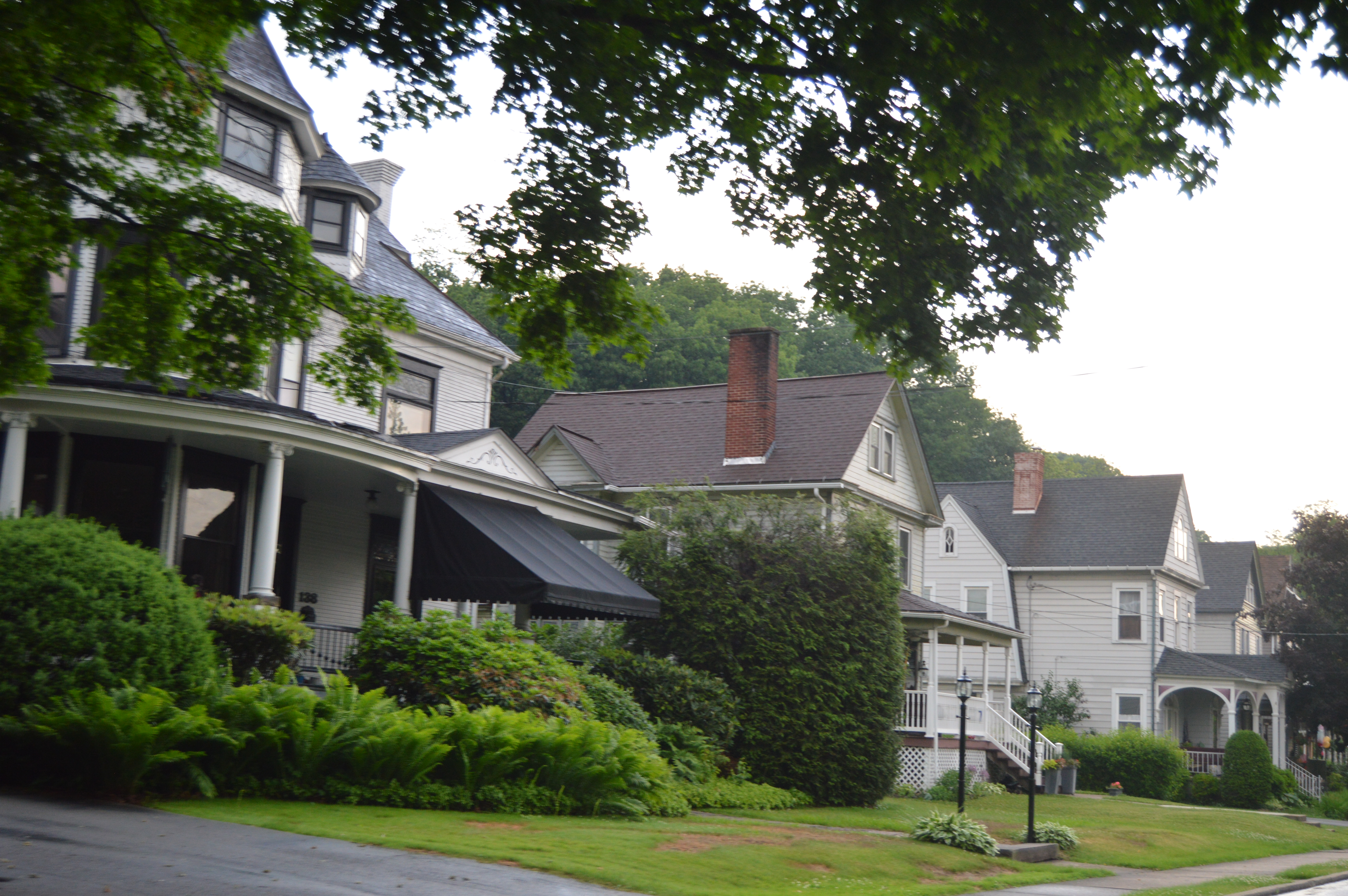
- Houses on Allegheny Avenue

- Location of Applewold in Armstrong County, Pennsylvania.

- Location within Pennsylvania
- Coordinates: 40°48′31″N 79°31′20″W
- Country: United States
- State: Pennsylvania
- County: Armstrong
- Incorporated: 1899

Government
  - Type: Council-Mayor
  - Mayor: Gretchen Dosch

Area
  - Total: 0.046 sq mi (0.12 km^{2})
  - Land: 0.046 sq mi (0.12 km^{2})
  - Water: 0 sq mi (0.00 km^{2})
- Elevation: 790 ft (240 m)

Population (2020)
  - Total: 334
  - Density: 7,112.1/sq mi (2,746.01/km^{2})
- Time zone: UTC-5 (Eastern (EST))
  - Summer (DST): UTC-4 (EDT)
- ZIP code: 16201
- FIPS code: 42-02752
- Website: www.applewoldboro.com

Applewold is a borough in Armstrong County, Pennsylvania, United States. The population was 334 at the 2020 census.

== Geography ==
Applewold is located at 40°48′31″N 79°31′20″W (40.808634, −79.522177) on the west bank of the Allegheny River, approximately 40 miles (64 km) northeast of Pittsburgh. Applewold is bordered by the borough of West Kittanning to the west, and the borough of Kittanning lies directly across the Allegheny River to the east.

According to the United States Census Bureau, Applewold has a total area of 0.039 square miles (0.1 km^{2}), all land.

== Demographics ==
Historical population
Census	Pop.	Note	%±
1900	122		—
1910	300		145.9%
1920	351		17.0%
1930	477		35.9%
1940	457		−4.2%
1950	500		9.4%
1960	489		−2.2%
1970	515		5.3%
1980	395		−23.3%
1990	388		−1.8%
2000	356		−8.2%
2010	310		−12.9%
2020	334		7.7%

As of the 2000 census, there were 356 people, 143 households, and 76 families residing in the borough. The population density was 7,302.3 inhabitants per square mile (2,819.4/km^{2}). There were 160 housing units at an average density of 3,281.9 per square mile (1,267.1/km^{2}). The racial makeup of the borough was 100.00% White.

There were 143 households, out of which 23.1% had children under the age of 18 living with them, 38.5% were married couples living together, 12.6% had a female householder with no husband present, and 46.2% were non-families. 37.1% of all households were made up of individuals, and 14.0% had someone living alone who was 65 years of age or older. The average household size was 2.17 and the average family size was 2.86.

The borough median age of 40 years was the same as the county median age. The distribution by age group was 20.8% under the age of 18, 8.1% from 18 to 24, 27.0% from 25 to 44, 19.7% from 45 to 64, and 24.4% who were 65 years of age or older. The median age was 40 years. For every 100 females there were 72.0 males. For every 100 females age 18 and over, there were 70.9 males.

The median income for a household in the borough was $30,714, and the median income for a family was $35,625. Males had a median income of $32,500 versus $19,464 for females. The per capita income for the borough was $16,549. About 3.0% of families and 9.8% of the population were below the poverty line, including 13.8% of those under age 18 and 3.8% of those age 65 or over.
