= Climax, Pennsylvania =

Unincorporated community in Pennsylvania, US

- Unincorporated community
- Location within Pennsylvania
- Coordinates: 40°59′03″N 79°22′34″W
- Country: United States
- State: Pennsylvania
- County: Armstrong
- Township: Mahoning
- Elevation: 1,076 ft (328 m)
- Time zone: UTC-5 (Eastern (EST))
  - Summer (DST): UTC-4 (EDT)
- ZIP code: 16242
- Area code: 814
- GNIS feature ID: 1172006

Climax is an unincorporated community in Armstrong County, Pennsylvania, United States, located near New Bethlehem and Clarion. The community is known for its mining industry, namely gypsum. Its ZIP code is 16242.
