= Seminole, Pennsylvania =

Unincorporated community in Pennsylvania, US

- Unincorporated community
- Location within Pennsylvania
- Coordinates: 40°57′17″N 79°20′34″W
- Country: United States
- State: Pennsylvania
- County: Armstrong
- Township: Mahoning
- Elevation: 1,381 ft (421 m)
- Time zone: UTC-5 (Eastern (EST))
  - Summer (DST): UTC-4 (EDT)
- ZIP code: 16253
- Area code: 814
- GNIS feature ID: 1187249

Seminole is an unincorporated community in Armstrong County, Pennsylvania, United States. The community is 3.3 miles (5.3 km) south of New Bethlehem. Seminole had its own post office until September 28, 2002; it still has its own ZIP code, 16253.
