= Hooks, Pennsylvania =

- Unincorporated community
- Location within Pennsylvania
- Coordinates: 40°55′38″N 79°29′16″W
- Country: United States
- State: Pennsylvania
- County: Armstrong
- Township: Madison
- Elevation: 833 ft (254 m)
- Time zone: UTC-5 (Eastern (EST))
  - Summer (DST): UTC-4 (EDT)
- GNIS feature ID: 1177355

Hooks is an unincorporated community in Madison Township, Armstrong County, Pennsylvania, United States. It is 17.4 miles (28.0 km) miles north of Kittanning. Hooks is bordered on the east by the Allegheny River.

== History ==
There is no record of a post office called Hooks.
