= McVille, Pennsylvania =

Unincorporated community in Pennsylvania, US

- Unincorporated community
- Location within Pennsylvania
- Coordinates: 40°43′33″N 79°36′10″W
- Country: United States
- State: Pennsylvania
- County: Armstrong
- Township: South Buffalo
- Elevation: 1,073 ft (327 m)
- Time zone: UTC-5 (Eastern (EST))
  - Summer (DST): UTC-4 (EDT)
- GNIS feature ID: 1180808

McVille is an unincorporated community in South Buffalo Township, Armstrong County, Pennsylvania, United States. The community is 6.6 miles (10.6 km) northeast of Freeport along PA-128, south of Nicholson Run. McVille Airport lies 0.7 miles (1.1 km) to the northeast on Ford City Road at 40°44′07″N 79°35′57″W. McVille Union Cemetery is located nearby, on the north side of McVille Road, at 40°43′39″N 79°36′18″W.

== History ==
The McVill post office was established on May 5, 1864, with Robert McCaslin as postmaster. It remained in operation until 1903. That same year, 1864, John Boyd opened a store about 190 yards northwest of the steam mill then located on the west side of Nicholson's run. The first and only resident clergyman at McVill in 1883 was Rev. Jacob F. Dean, Baptist, who settled there in 1868.

McVill P.O. appears in the 1876 Atlas of Armstrong County, Pennsylvania.
