= Dee, Pennsylvania =

- Unincorporated community
- Location within Pennsylvania
- Coordinates: 40°56′06″N 79°26′36″W
- Country: United States
- State: Pennsylvania
- County: Armstrong
- Elevation: 840 ft (260 m)
- Time zone: UTC-5 (Eastern (EST))
  - Summer (DST): UTC-4 (EDT)
- GNIS feature ID: 1203395

Dee is an unincorporated community in Armstrong County, Pennsylvania, United States.

== History ==
A post office called Dee was established in 1889 and remained in operation until 1901.
