= Mosgrove, Armstrong County, Pennsylvania =

Unincorporated community in Pennsylvania, US

Mosgrove, Pennsylvania
- Unincorporated community
- Location within Pennsylvania
- Coordinates: 40°52′08″N 79°28′31″W
- Country: United States
- State: Pennsylvania
- County: Armstrong
- Township: Rayburn
- Elevation: 978 ft (298 m)
- Time zone: UTC-5 (Eastern (EST))
  - Summer (DST): UTC-4 (EDT)
- GNIS feature ID: 1181608

Mosgrove is an unincorporated community in Rayburn Township, Armstrong County, Pennsylvania, United States. The community lies along the east side of the Allegheny River, 7.0 miles (11.3 km) north of Kittanning via Pennsylvania Route 66.

== History ==
A post office called Mosgrove was established in 1886 and remained in operation until 1938.
