= Pine Township, Armstrong County, Pennsylvania =

Township in Pennsylvania, US

Coordinates: 40°55′15″N 79°26′08″W

- Township
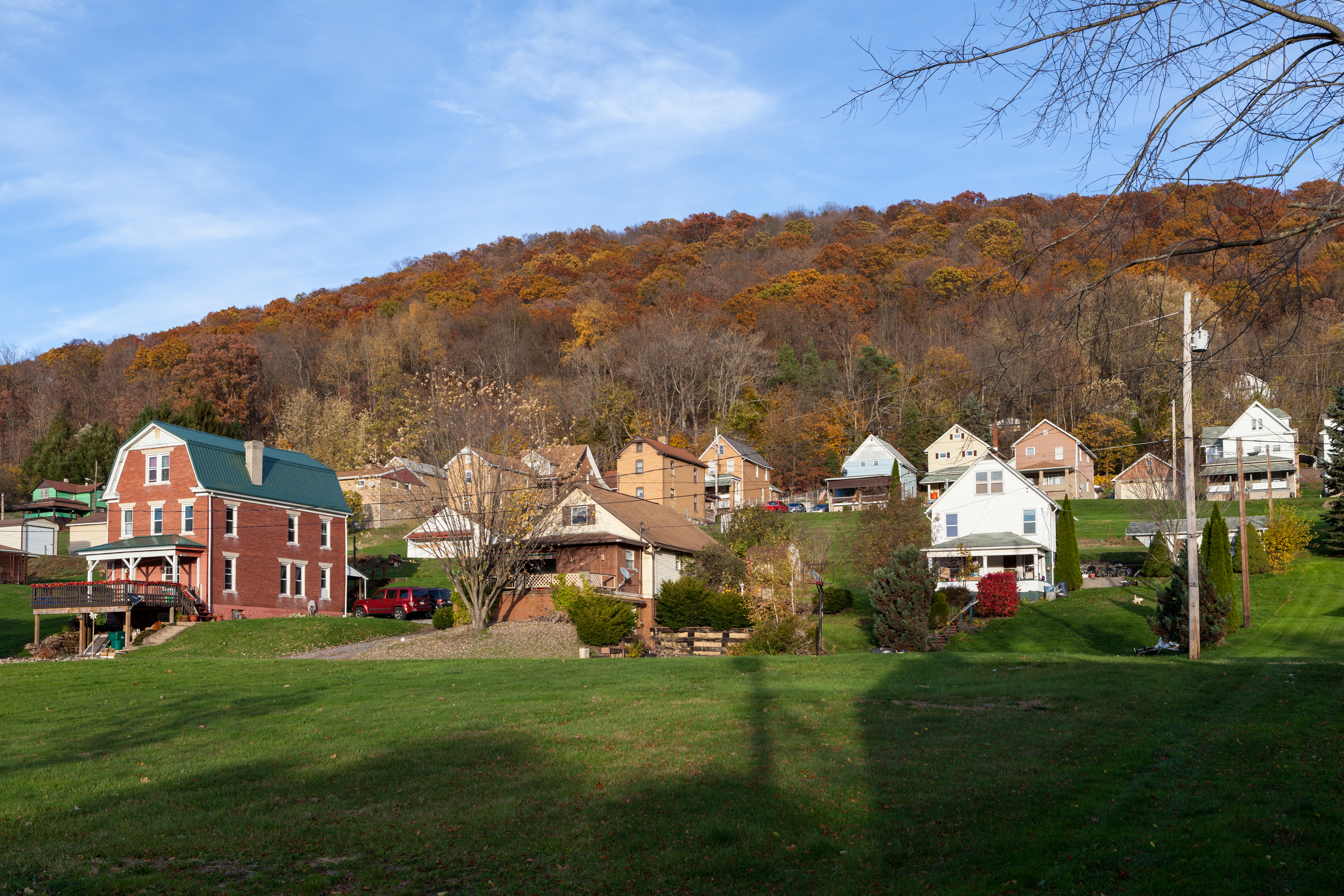
- Looking at the north portion of Templeton, an unincorporated community in Pine Township

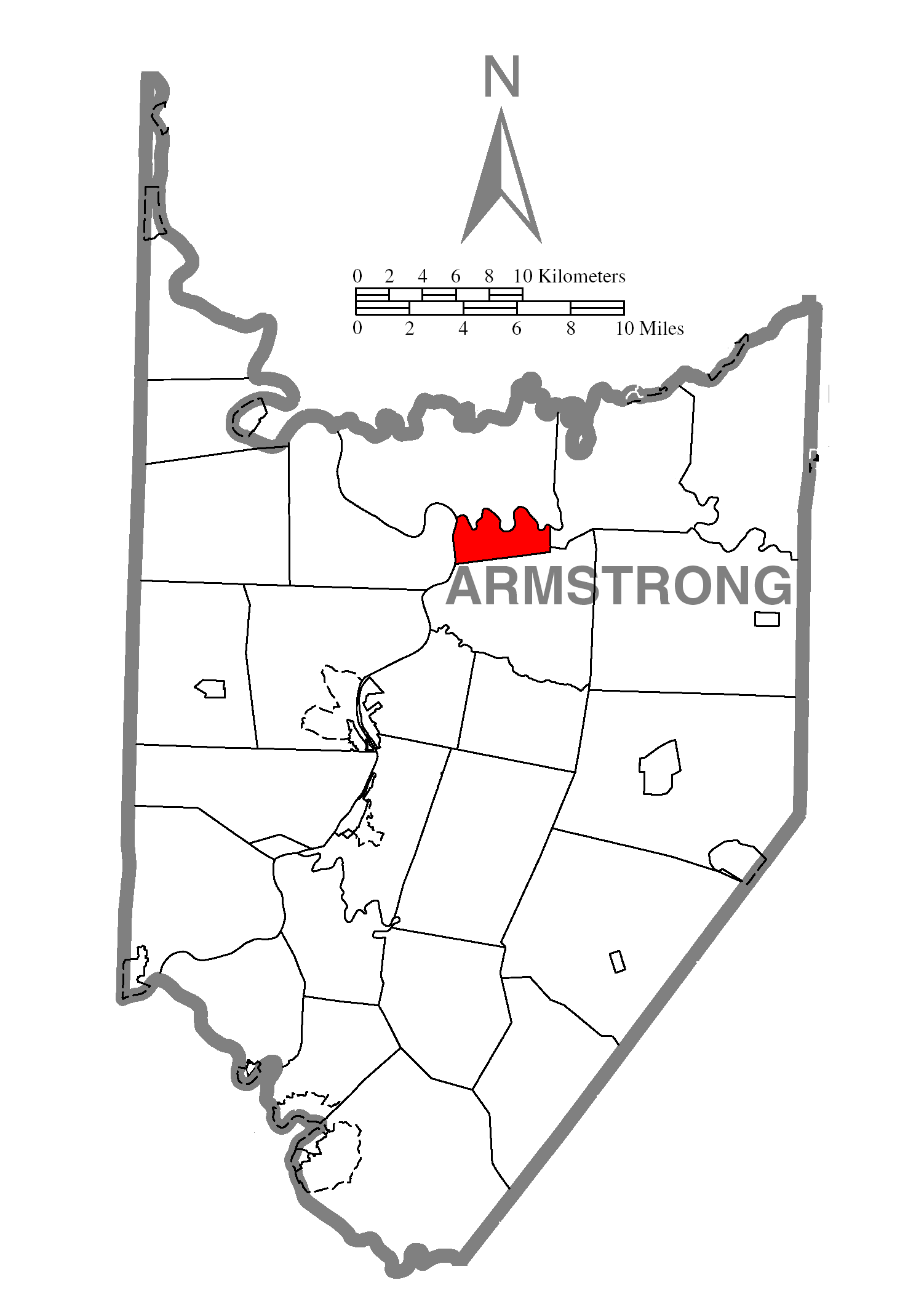
- Map of Armstrong County, Pennsylvania, highlighting Pine Township

- Map of Armstrong County, Pennsylvania
- Country: United States
- State: Pennsylvania
- County: Armstrong
- Settled: 1790
- Incorporated: 1836

Area
  - Total: 4.59 sq mi (11.90 km^{2})
  - Land: 4.34 sq mi (11.25 km^{2})
  - Water: 0.25 sq mi (0.65 km^{2})

Population (2020)
  - Total: 351
  - Estimate (2021): 349
  - Density: 89.3/sq mi (34.48/km^{2})
- Time zone: UTC-5 (Eastern (EST))
  - Summer (DST): UTC-4 (EDT)
- FIPS code: 42-005-60280
- Website: https://www.twp.pine.pa.us/

Pine Township is a township that is located in Armstrong County, Pennsylvania, United States. The population was 351 at the time of the 2020 census, a decrease from the figure of 412 that was tabulated in 2010.

== History ==
Pine Township appears in the 1876 Atlas of Armstrong County, Pennsylvania. Its early history is detailed in Robert Walter Smith's 1883 History of Armstrong County.

=== Cemeteries ===
- Bell Town Road Cemetery
- Stewardson Furnace Cemetery

== Geography ==
Pine Township is located in northern Armstrong County, along the east bank of the Allegheny River and the south bank of Mahoning Creek. The unincorporated community of Templeton along the Allegheny River is the primary settlement in the township.

According to the United States Census Bureau, the township has a total area of 4.6 square miles (11.9 km^{2}), of which 4.4 square miles (11.3 km^{2}) is land and 0.27 square miles (0.7 km^{2}), or 5.48%, is water.

== Demographics ==
Historical population
Census	Pop.	Note	%±
2010	412		—
2020	351		−14.8%
2021 (est.)	349		−0.6%
U.S. Decennial Census

As of the 2000 census, there were 499 people, 202 households, and 143 families residing in the township.

The population density was 101.6 inhabitants per square mile (39.2/km^{2}). There were 284 housing units at an average density of 57.8 per square mile (22.3/km^{2}).

The racial makeup of the township was 99.60% White, and 0.40% from two or more races. Hispanic or Latino of any race were 0.40% of the population.

There were 202 households, out of which 32.2% had children under the age of eighteen living with them; 55.4% were married couples living together, 9.4% had a female householder with no husband present, and 29.2% were non-families. 26.2% of all households were made up of individuals, and 14.4% had someone living alone who was sixty-five years of age or older.

The average household size was 2.47 and the average family size was 2.94.

The township median age of thirty-seven years was significantly less than the county median age of forty years. The distribution by age group was 25.3% of residents who were under the age of eighteen, 8.6% who were aged eighteen to twenty-four, 30.1% who were aged twenty-five to forty-four, 18.2% who were aged forty-five to sixty-four, and 17.8% who were sixty-five years of age or older. The median age was thirty-seven years.

For every one hundred females, there were 104.5 males. For every one hundred females who were aged eighteen or older, there were 103.8 males.

The median income for a household in the township was $31,250, and the median income for a family was $33,558. Males had a median income of $31,364 compared with that of $17,500 for females.

The per capita income for the township was $17,824.

Approximately 8.5% of families and 11.4% of the population were living below the poverty line, including 13.3% of those who were under the age of eighteen and 6.2% of those who were aged sixty-five or older.

== Recreation ==
Portions of Pennsylvania State Game Lands Number 287 are located in Pine Township just outside of Templeton.
