= Belknap, Pennsylvania =

Unincorporated community in Pennsylvania, US

- Unincorporated community
- Location within Pennsylvania
- Coordinates: 40°53′57″N 79°18′10″W
- Country: United States
- State: Pennsylvania
- County: Armstrong
- Township: Wayne
- Elevation: 1,506 ft (459 m)
- Time zone: UTC-5 (Eastern (EST))
  - Summer (DST): UTC-4 (EDT)
- GNIS feature ID: 1169142

Belknap is an unincorporated community in Wayne Township, Armstrong County, Pennsylvania, United States.

== History ==
A post office called Belknap was established in 1855, and remained in operation until 1909. Belknap appears in the 1876 Atlas of Armstrong County, Pennsylvania.
