= Kellersburg, Pennsylvania =

Unincorporated community in Pennsylvania, US

- Unincorporated community
- Location within Pennsylvania
- Coordinates: 40°58′10″N 79°25′27″W
- Country: United States
- State: Pennsylvania
- County: Armstrong
- Township: Madison
- Elevation: 1,470 ft (450 m)
- Time zone: UTC-5 (Eastern (EST))
  - Summer (DST): UTC-4 (EDT)
- GNIS feature ID: 1178323

Kellersburg is an unincorporated community in Madison Township, Armstrong County, Pennsylvania, United States.

== History ==
Kellersburg was founded in 1842 by Nicholas Keller Sr. consisting originally of twenty-three lots, on both sides of the Olean road in the eastern part of the township Keller sold his lots at $20 and $30 each, good prices for those days, retaining 5/16 of an acre for his hotel and store.

The Red Bank post office was established May 13, 1842, with C. Shunk as postmaster. On February 24, 1871, its name was changed to Kellersburgh, with David Grant as postmaster. Its name was changed again to Kellersburg in 1894. In 1913 A. M. Willison was postmaster, keeping the post office in his store.

=== Churches ===
Salem Evangelical Lutheran Church

Having been organized as far back as 1836 by Rev. G. A. Reichert, Salem Evangelical Lutheran Church is one of the oldest of the faith in the county.

The pastors from the beginning have been: Rev. G. A. Reichert, 1832–37; Rev. Henry D. Keyl, occasionally from 1838 to 1842; Rev. William Uhl, 1846–48; Rev. J. A. Nuner, 1849–51; Rev. Thomas Stock, 1851–54; Rev. George F. Ehrenfeld, 1854–55; Rev. Thomas Steck, 1856; Rev. Michael Sweigert, 1858–64; Rev. Henry Gathers, 1864–68; Rev. S. S. Stouffer, 1870; Rev. William E. Crebs, 1871–73; Rev. David Townsend, 1873–74; Rev. Wilson Selner, 1875–81; Rev. Elias A. Best, 1883–86; Rev. J. W. Schwartz, 1889–92; Rev. W. M. Hering, 1892–93; Rev. William J. Bucher, 1893–97; Rev. F. J. Matter, 1897–1900; Rev. Charles E. Berkey, 1900–03; Rev. W. B. Claney, 1903–10; Rev. William E. Sunday, 1910.

Methodist Episcopal Church

In 1871 the Methodists erected a substantial house of worship with a congregation largely coming from nearby Widnoon. The pastor in 1914 was Rev. John Wall.
