= Tidal, Armstrong County, Pennsylvania =

Unincorporated community in Pennsylvania, US

Tidal, Pennsylvania
- Unincorporated community
- Location within Pennsylvania
- Coordinates: 40°57′28″N 79°29′46″W
- Country: United States
- State: Pennsylvania
- County: Armstrong
- Township: Madison
- Elevation: 1,335 ft (407 m)
- Time zone: UTC-5 (Eastern (EST))
  - Summer (DST): UTC-4 (EDT)
- GNIS feature ID: 1189562

Tidal is an unincorporated community in Madison Township, Armstrong County, Pennsylvania, United States. The community is 15.0 miles (24.1 km) north of Kittanning along Pennsylvania Route 1031.

== History ==
A post office called Tidal was established in 1888 and remained in operation until 1940.
