= Lenape Heights, Pennsylvania =

Unincorporated community in Pennsylvania, US

- Census-designated place
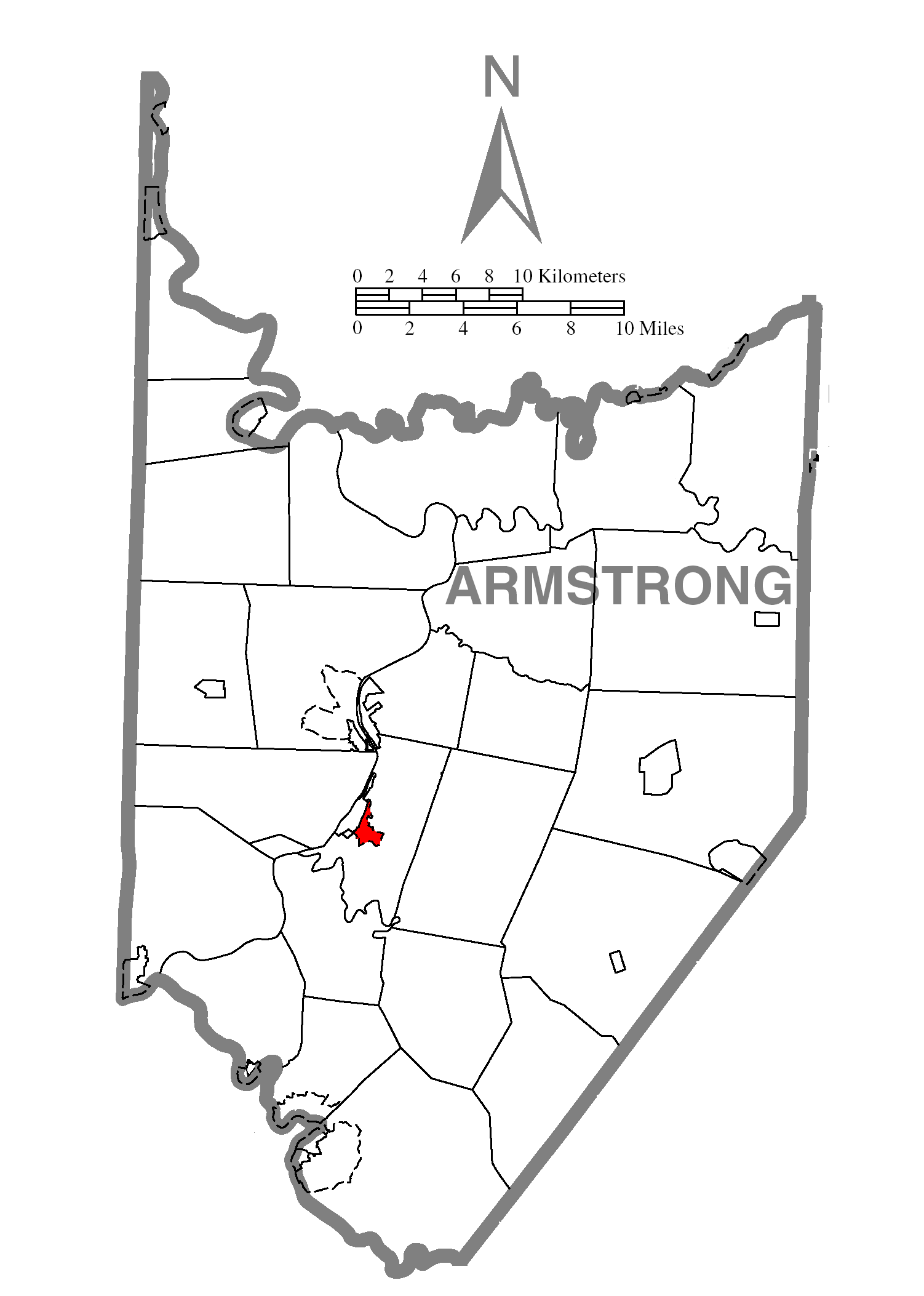
- Location within Armstrong County

- Location within the U.S. state of Pennsylvania Lenape Heights (the United States)
- Coordinates: 40°45′55″N 79°31′21″W
- Country: United States
- State: Pennsylvania
- County: Armstrong
- Township: Manor

Area
  - Total: 0.76 sq mi (1.98 km^{2})
  - Land: 0.76 sq mi (1.98 km^{2})
  - Water: 0 sq mi (0.00 km^{2})

Population (2020)
  - Total: 1,144
  - Density: 1,498.0/sq mi (578.38/km^{2})
- Time zone: UTC-5 (Eastern (EST))
  - Summer (DST): UTC-4 (EDT)
- ZIP code: 16226
- Area code: 724
- FIPS code: 42-42672

Lenape Heights is a census-designated place (CDP) in Armstrong County, Pennsylvania, United States. The population was 1,144 at the 2020 census.

== Geography ==
Lenape Heights is located at 40°45′55″N 79°31′21″W (40.765411, −79.522388).

According to the United States Census Bureau, the CDP has a total area of 0.7 square miles (1.8 km^{2}), all land.

== Demographics ==
Historical population
Census	Pop.	Note	%±
2020	1,144		—
U.S. Decennial Census

As of the 2000 census, there were 1,212 people, 520 households, and 368 families living in the CDP. The population density was 1,670.9 inhabitants per square mile (645.1/km^{2}). There were 543 housing units at an average density of 748.6 per square mile (289.0/km^{2}). The racial makeup of the CDP was 98.76% White, 0.25% African American, 0.08% Native American, 0.17% from other races, and 0.74% from two or more races. Hispanic or Latino of any race were 0.41% of the population.

There were 520 households, out of which 24.4% had children under the age of 18 living with them, 61.3% were married couples living together, 7.1% had a female householder with no husband present, and 29.2% were non-families. 26.0% of all households were made up of individuals, and 17.5% had someone living alone who was 65 years of age or older. The average household size was 2.33 and the average family size was 2.79.

In the CDP, the population was spread out, with 20.3% under the age of 18, 4.5% from 18 to 24, 23.4% from 25 to 44, 25.5% from 45 to 64, and 26.3% who were 65 years of age or older. The median age was 46 years. For every 100 females, there were 91.5 males. For every 100 females age 18 and over, there were 92.4 males.

The median income for a household in the CDP was $31,636, and the median income for a family was $39,265. Males had a median income of $31,184 versus $21,953 for females. The per capita income for the CDP was $20,261. About 3.6% of families and 2.9% of the population were below the poverty line, including 1.7% of those under age 18 and 2.0% of those age 65 or over.
