= West Hills, Pennsylvania =

Unincorporated community in Pennsylvania, US

- Census-designated place
- East Franklin Township
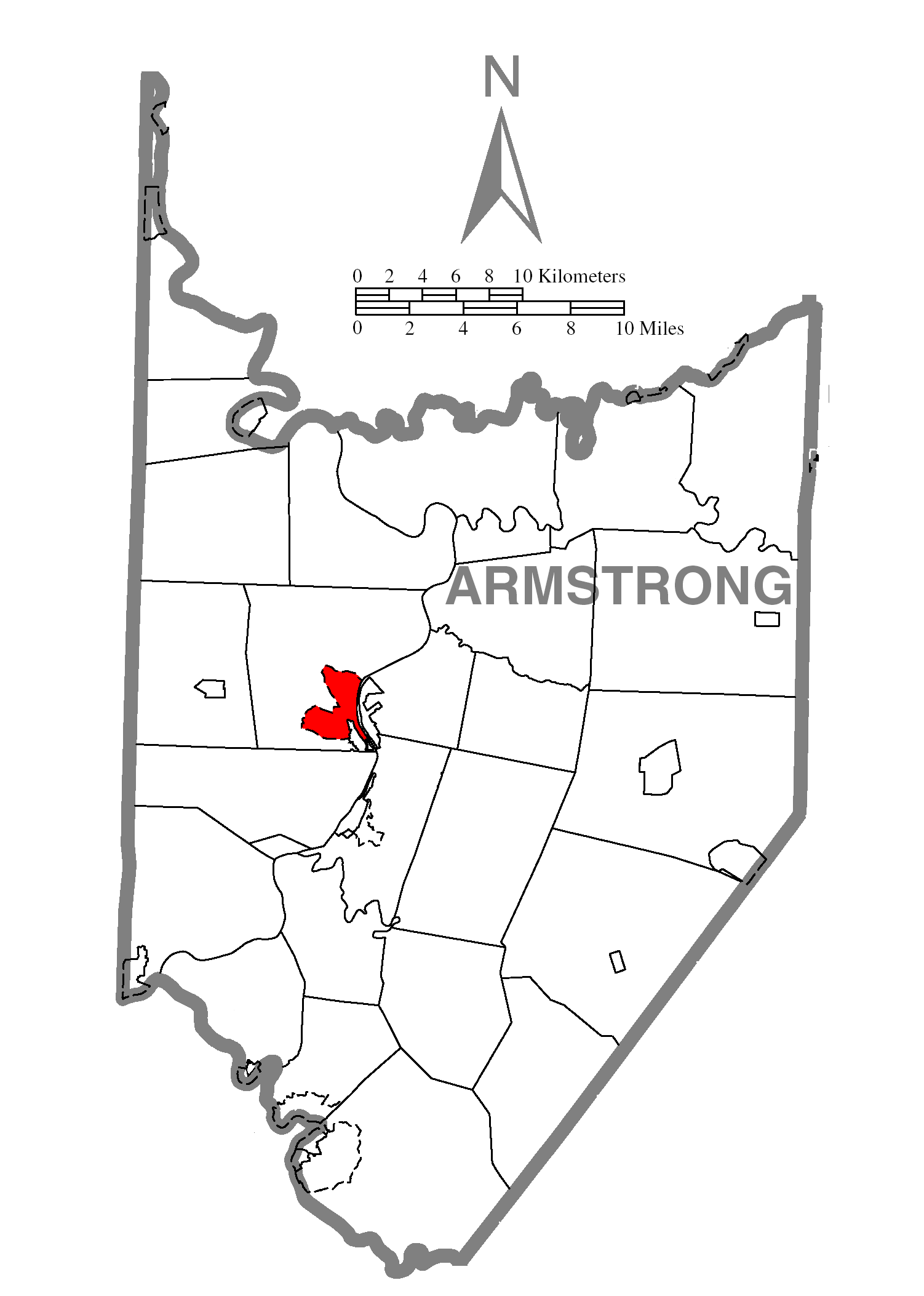
- Location within Armstrong County

- Location within the U.S. state of Pennsylvania West Hills (the United States)
- Coordinates: 40°49′28″N 79°32′34″W
- Country: United States
- State: Pennsylvania
- County: Armstrong
- Township: East Franklin

Area
  - Total: 3.5 sq mi (9.1 km^{2})
  - Land: 3.3 sq mi (8.5 km^{2})
  - Water: 0.2 sq mi (0.52 km^{2})

Population (2020)
  - Total: 1,228
  - Density: 370/sq mi (140/km^{2})
- Time zone: UTC-5 (Eastern (EST))
  - Summer (DST): UTC-4 (EDT)

West Hills is a census-designated place (CDP) in Armstrong County, Pennsylvania, United States. The population was 1,228 at the 2020 census.

== Geography ==
West Hills is located at 40°49′28″N 79°32′34″W (40.824475, −79.542873).

According to the United States Census Bureau, the CDP has a total area of 3.5 square miles (9.1 km^{2}), of which 3.3 square miles (8.5 km^{2}) is land and 0.2 square miles (0.52 km^{2}) (5.97%) is water.

== Demographics ==
As of the 2000 census, there were 1,229 people, 501 households, and 390 families living in the CDP. The population density was 371.8 inhabitants per square mile (143.6/km^{2}). There were 517 housing units at an average density of 156.4 per square mile (60.4/km^{2}). The racial makeup of the CDP was 99.27% White, 0.08% Native American, 0.08% Pacific Islander, and 0.57% from two or more races. Hispanic or Latino of any race were 0.24% of the population.

There were 501 households, out of which 28.3% had children under the age of 18 living with them, 69.7% were married couples living together, 6.6% had a female householder with no husband present, and 22.0% were non-families. 19.4% of all households were made up of individuals, and 11.0% had someone living alone who was 65 years of age or older. The average household size was 2.44 and the average family size was 2.79.

In the CDP, the population was spread out, with 21.0% under the age of 18, 5.6% from 18 to 24, 23.3% from 25 to 44, 31.1% from 45 to 64, and 19.0% who were 65 years of age or older. The median age was 45 years. For every 100 females, there were 90.2 males. For every 100 females age 18 and over, there were 89.6 males.

The median income for a household in the CDP was $33,398, and the median income for a family was $47,685. Males had a median income of $34,792 versus $22,647 for females. The per capita income for the CDP was $18,132. About 6.8% of families and 8.1% of the population were below the poverty line, including 10.5% of those under age 18 and 11.6% of those age 65 or over.
