= Echo, Pennsylvania =

Unincorporated community in Pennsylvania, US

- Unincorporated community
- Location within Pennsylvania
- Coordinates: 40°51′00″N 79°19′38″W
- Country: United States
- State: Pennsylvania
- County: Armstrong
- Elevation: 1,125 ft (343 m)
- Time zone: UTC-5 (Eastern (EST))
  - Summer (DST): UTC-4 (EDT)
- GNIS feature ID: 1203488

Echo is an unincorporated community in Armstrong County, Pennsylvania, United States.

== History ==
A post office called Echo was established in 1857 and remained in operation until 1940. According to tradition, the community was named from the echoes bouncing off nearby ridges.
