= McWilliams, Armstrong County, Pennsylvania =

Unincorporated community in Pennsylvania, US

McWilliams, Pennsylvania
- Unincorporated community
- Location within Pennsylvania
- Coordinates: 40°57′57″N 79°15′07″W
- Country: United States
- State: Pennsylvania
- County: Armstrong
- Township: Redbank
- Elevation: 1,217 ft (371 m)
- Time zone: UTC-5 (Eastern (EST))
  - Summer (DST): UTC-4 (EDT)
- GNIS feature ID: 1204141

McWilliams is an unincorporated community in Redbank Township, Armstrong County, Pennsylvania, United States. The community is 6.9 miles (11.1 km) southeast of New Bethlehem along Pennsylvania Route 839.

== History ==
A post office called McWilliams was established in 1883 and remained in operation until 1907.
