= Oakland Township, Pennsylvania =

Oakland Township is the name of three townships in the U.S. state of Pennsylvania:

- Oakland Township, Butler County, Pennsylvania
- Oakland Township, Susquehanna County, Pennsylvania
- Oakland Township, Venango County, Pennsylvania

== See also ==
- Oakland, Pennsylvania
