= Milton, Armstrong County, Pennsylvania =

Unincorporated community in Pennsylvania, US

Milton, Pennsylvania
- Unincorporated community
- Location within Pennsylvania
- Coordinates: 40°54′35″N 79°13′00″W
- Country: United States
- State: Pennsylvania
- County: Armstrong
- Township: Redbank
- Elevation: 1,204 ft (367 m)
- Time zone: UTC-5 (Eastern (EST))
  - Summer (DST): UTC-4 (EDT)
- ZIP code: 15686
- Area codes: 724, 878
- GNIS feature ID: 1181297

Milton is an unincorporated community in Redbank Township, Armstrong County, Pennsylvania, United States.

== History ==
A post office called Phoenix was established on February 4, 1847 with William Guthrie, postmaster. It remained in operation until 1908. Milton appears in the 1876 Atlas of Armstrong County, Pennsylvania/
