= Chickasaw, Pennsylvania =

Unincorporated community in Pennsylvania, US

- Unincorporated community
- Location within Pennsylvania
- Coordinates: 40°57′21″N 79°27′26″W
- Country: United States
- State: Pennsylvania
- County: Armstrong
- Township: Wayne
- Elevation: 1,398 ft (426 m)
- Time zone: UTC-5 (Eastern (EST))
  - Summer (DST): UTC-4 (EDT)
- GNIS feature ID: 1212188

Chickasaw is an unincorporated community in Madison Township, Armstrong County, Pennsylvania, United States.

== History ==
A post office called Chickasaw was established in 1912, and remained in operation until 1931.
