= Armstrong County, Pennsylvania =

County in Pennsylvania, United States

- County
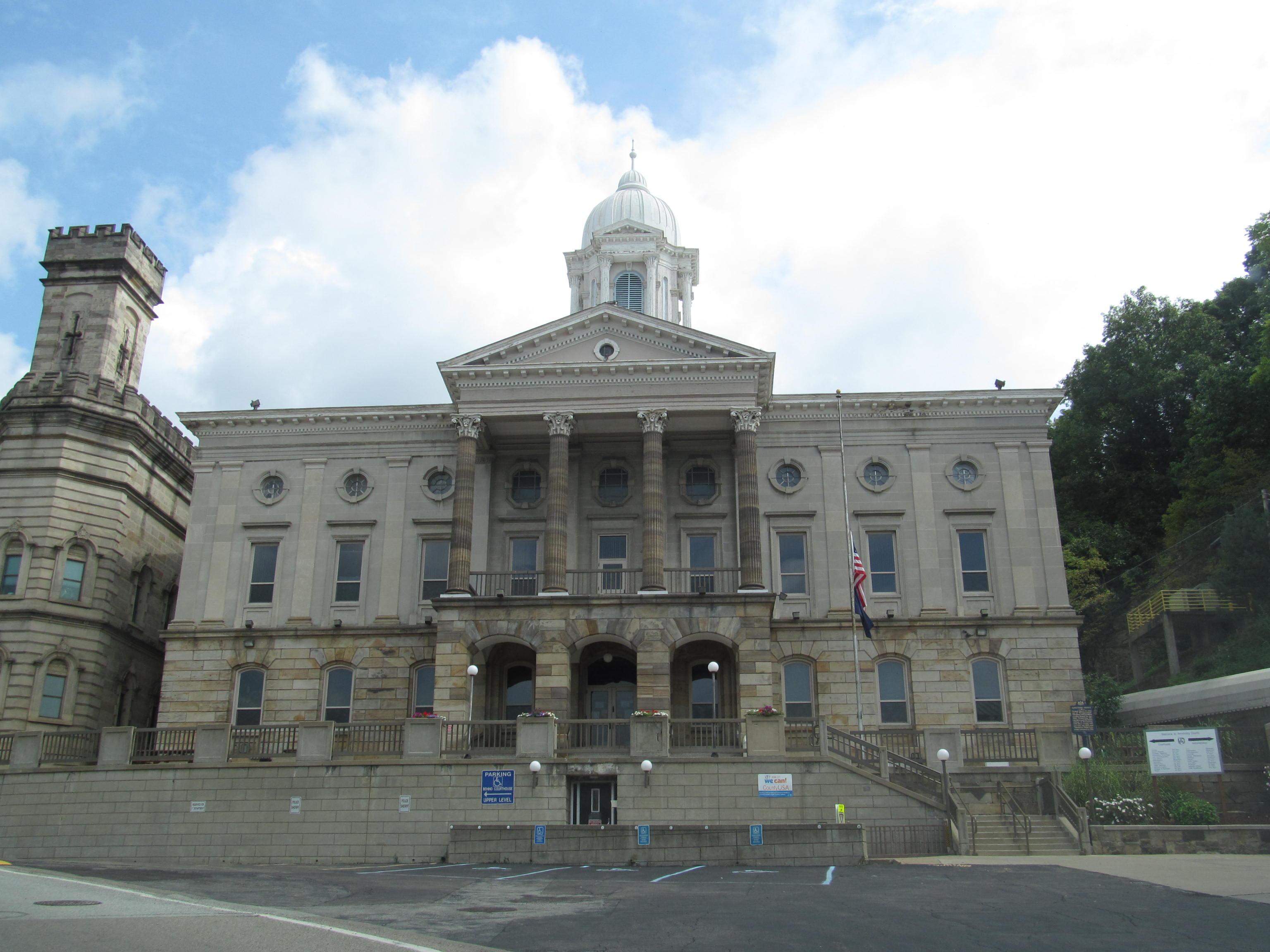
- Armstrong County Courthouse

- Seal

- Location within the U.S. state of Pennsylvania
- Coordinates: 40°49′N 79°28′W
- Country: United States
- State: Pennsylvania
- Founded: March 12, 1800
- Named for: John Armstrong
- Seat: Kittanning
- Largest borough: Kittanning

Area
  - Total: 664 sq mi (1,720 km^{2})
  - Land: 653 sq mi (1,690 km^{2})
  - Water: 11 sq mi (28 km^{2}) 1.6%

Population (2020)
  - Total: 65,558
  - Estimate (2025): 63,698 ▼
  - Density: 100/sq mi (38.8/km^{2})
- Time zone: UTC−5 (Eastern)
  - Summer (DST): UTC−4 (EDT)
- Congressional district: 15th
- Website: www.co.armstrong.pa.us

Pennsylvania Historical Marker
- Designated: October 15, 1982

Armstrong County is a county in the Commonwealth of Pennsylvania. As of the 2020 census, the population was 65,558. The county seat is Kittanning. The county was organized on March 12, 1800, from parts of Allegheny, Westmoreland and Lycoming Counties. It was named in honor of John Armstrong, who represented Pennsylvania in the Continental Congress and served as a major general during the Revolutionary War. The county is part of the Greater Pittsburgh region of the commonwealth. (Note: Includes Allegheny, Washington, Butler, Beaver, Lawrence and Armstrong Counties)

== History ==
=== Pre-settlement ===
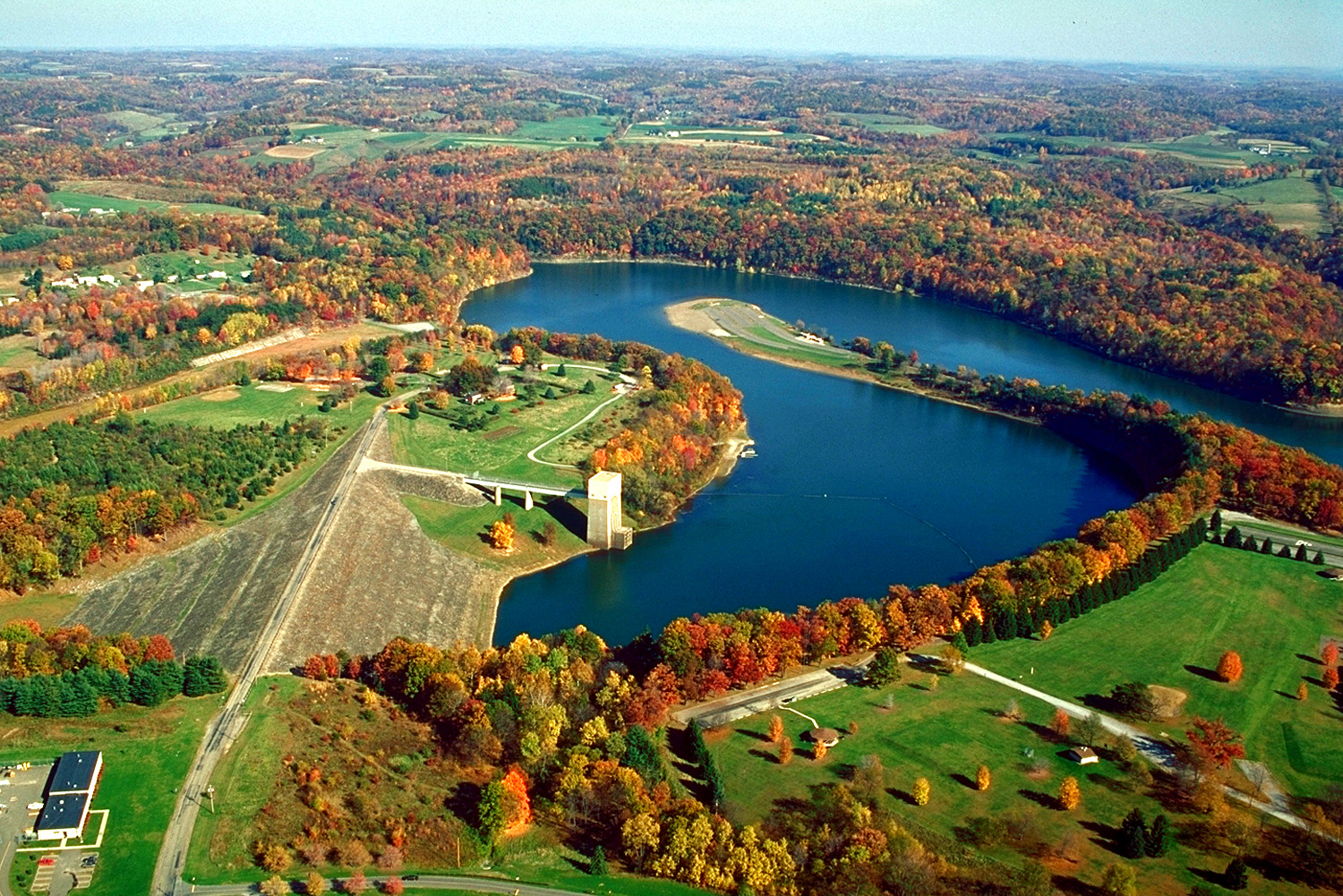
Crooked Creek Lake Recreation Area, a dam, reservoir, and park near Ford City in Armstrong County

Little is known of the pre-Columbian history of the area that is today called Armstrong County, but the often cited starting point begins with the civilization known colloquially as the Mound Builders.

Several 19th-20th century farmers throughout the county have unearthed artifacts from this time period, such as arrowheads. Several of the prominent earthen works characteristic of this culture have been removed for agricultural and settlement purposes. One prominent mound was located between present-day Kittanning and Ford City and was believed to have been an earthen fortification used to defend against other tribal peoples. Other mounds were found in Boggs, South Buffalo, and Washington townships. The aboriginal inhabitants were given the name "Allegewi" by the tribes that drove them out sometime between the 15th and 17th centuries.

Historical accounts describe the tribes that conquered the Allegewi as primarily the Lenape or "Delaware" tribes, along with bands of Mohawk, Oneidas, Cayugas, Onondagas, and Seneca tribes. The Lenape tribe made semi-permanent and permanent settlements in and around present-day Kittanning, and much of the area functioned as their hunting and agricultural lands. Blockhouses built by the Lenape, not unlike the early European settler dwellings, were commonly seen around Ford City, Kittanning, South Buffalo, Brady's Bend, and Red Bank. The Lenape were the primary inhabitants of the area and were the primary points of contact for European settlers in this area at the turn of the 18th century.

=== 18th century ===
With the arrival of European settlers also came the competing claims to the territory, primarily between the French and British empires, who were engaged in what became known as the Seven Years' War. As the global conflict between the two empires expanded into the "New World," both sides attempted to court the many Native American tribes. Several tribes in the Allegheny River Valley, including the Lenni-Lenape, sided with the French during this time period, as their friendship appeared to be more advantageous to their own territorial claims against the British-friendly Iroquois Nations.

In exchange for furs, freedom of movement in Lenape territory, and guerilla raids on British troops and settlers, the French supplied weapons and other European goods and offered military protection to the friendly tribes. This agreement and similar alliances with other tribes allowed the French to become more well dug-in along the Allegheny River, most prominently at Fort Duquesne in present-day Pittsburgh. Several military engagements in the Ohio Country, which would later become Western Pennsylvania, were part of the French and Indian War.

One of the minor battles that erupted during the French and Indian War occurred at the present site of the Armstrong County seat, Kittanning, or Kit-hane-ink, as it was referred to by the Lenape, meaning "settlement by the main river." Although the Battle of Kittanning was inconsequential to the greater conflict with the French and Indian tribes, it is an integral part of Armstrong County's history. The expedition, led by Lieutenant Colonel John Armstrong, brought about the destruction of the Lenape village of Kittanning, which had served as a staging point for attacks by Lenape (Delaware) warriors against colonists in the colonial-era Province of Pennsylvania. Deep into hostile territory, the raid on Kittanning was the only major expedition carried out by Pennsylvania Provincial troops during the brutal backcountry war. It is often thought of by local historians as a type of pre-World War II Doolittle Raid.

With the surrender of George Washington at Fort Necessity in 1754 and Braddock's defeat in 1755, the settlers on the Pennsylvania frontier were without professional military protection, and scrambled to organize a defense. The French-allied Indians who had defeated General Edward Braddock at the Monongahela River were primarily from the Great Lakes region to the north. The local Indians, mostly Lenape and Shawnee who had migrated to the area after European colonists had settled their lands to the east, had waited to see who would win the contest—they could not risk siding with the loser. With Fort Duquesne now secured, the victorious French encouraged the Lenape and Shawnee to "take up the hatchet" against those who had taken their land.

Beginning about October 1755, Lenape and Shawnee war parties, often with French cooperation, began raiding settlements in Pennsylvania. Although European-Americans also waged war with cruelty, they found Indian warfare particularly brutal and frightening. Notable among the Indian raiders were the Lenape war leaders Shingas and Captain Jacobs, both of whom lived at Kittanning. The colonial governments of Pennsylvania and Virginia offered rewards for their scalps. Captain Jacobs was on an expedition led by Louis Coulon de Villiers that descended on Fort Granville (near present-day Lewistown) on the morning of August 2, 1756. The attackers were held off, but the garrison commander was killed, and his second in command surrendered the garrison, including the women and children, the next morning. The commander's brother, Lieutenant Colonel John Armstrong, immediately organized an expedition of 300 men against Kittanning in response. Early on September 8, 1756, they launched a surprise attack on the Indian village. Many of the Kittanning residents fled, but Captain Jacobs put up a defense, holing up with his wife and family inside their home. When he refused to surrender, his house and others were set on fire, touching off gunpowder that had been stored inside. Captain Jacobs was killed and scalped after jumping from his home in an attempt to escape the flames. The battle ended when the entire village was engulfed in flames.

The destruction of Kittanning was hailed as a victory in Pennsylvania, and Armstrong was known afterwards as the "Hero of Kittanning". He and his men collected the "scalp bounty" that had been placed on Captain Jacobs. However, the victory had limitations: the attackers suffered more casualties than they inflicted, and most of the villagers escaped, taking with them almost all of the prisoners that had been held in the village. The expedition also probably aggravated the frontier war; subsequent Indian raids that autumn were fiercer than ever. The Kittanning raid revealed to the village's inhabitants their vulnerability, and many moved to more secure areas. A peace faction led by Shingas's brother Tamaqua soon came to the forefront. Tamaqua eventually made peace with Pennsylvania in the Treaty of Easton, which enabled the British under General John Forbes to successfully mount an expedition in 1758 that drove the French from Fort Duquesne. Reenactments of the Battle of Kittanning have become a favorite pastime of the local inhabitants of present-day Armstrong County.

John Armstrong later served as a brigadier general in the Continental Army and as a major general in the Pennsylvania Militia during the Revolutionary War. He was also a delegate to the Continental Congress for Pennsylvania. Armstrong County, formed on March 12, 1800, from parts of Allegheny, Westmoreland and Lycoming Counties was named in the general's honor.

=== 19th century ===
In the early 1800s, most people in Armstrong County were "old stock Americans" of Scotch-Irish and English ancestry, whose ancestors had settled in the area prior to the American Revolution. In the decades following the American Civil War, and in particular between 1890 and 1910, immigrants arrived in large numbers from Germany, Italy, Ireland, and Poland.

As the county seat, Kittanning became the governmental, financial, and commercial hub for the county.

In the 1890s, Water Street (sometimes called "Millionaire Row") in Kittanning boasted more millionaire residents than anywhere else in Pennsylvania. Booming industries in the county such as coal, natural gas, plate glass, brick, ceramics, and iron created a strong local economy. Gradual population decline, via economic downturns, began in the 1970s and 1980s, and while there are still many coal mines and natural gas wells in operation throughout the county, the decline of the fossil fuel industry has severely limited the economy of Kittanning . Recently, revitalization efforts have led to a beautification of Market Street in Kittanning in an effort to attract new businesses and people.

Three miles downriver from Kittanning is Ford City. Incorporated in 1887, Ford City was a company town for John Baptiste Ford's renowned plate-glass industry, known now as Pittsburgh Plate Glass PPG Industries, a Fortune 500 Company. Eljer also operated a production facility along the river in Ford City that made ceramic toilets. The two companies employed nearly 10,000 people at the height of Armstrong County's economy.

In 1869, Leechburg was the first place in the United States to use natural gas for metallurgical purposes. Natural gas was found while drilling for oil, and eventually introduced into the boilers and furnaces of Siberian Iron Works.

Freeport, Leechburg, and Apollo were communities built along the Pennsylvania Canal, which passed through on the Allegheny and Kiskiminetas rivers, at the southern border of the county.

=== 20th century ===
In the 20th century, Ford City struggled economically, but kept its economy and heritage alive through creative businesses and lively festivals.

=== 21st century ===
Ford City is the future site of the Armstrong campus of Butler County Community College (BC3) - consistently ranked among the best community colleges in Pennsylvania.

Armstrong County is home to the City of Parker, an incorporated third-class city, which was an oil boom town with a population rumored to be approximately 20,000 in 1873, but now is the "Smallest City in America" with a population of just under 800. Parker is located in the extreme northwest portion of the county.

Iron was made in the Brady's Bend area of the county twenty years before there was a foundry in Pittsburgh doing so.

Elderton, whose name is derived from the famous resident of the area, Sara Elder, is a small community, home to the former Elderton Jr/Sr High School.

Worthington is the county's primary agricultural hub and lies just west of Kittanning along U.S. Route 422.

== Geography ==
According to the U.S. Census Bureau, the county has a total area of 664 square miles (1,720 km^{2}), of which 653 square miles (1,690 km^{2}) is land and 11 square miles (28 km^{2}) (1.6%) is water. Armstrong County is one of the 423 counties served by the Appalachian Regional Commission, and it is identified as part of the "Midlands" by Colin Woodard in his book American Nations: A History of the Eleven Rival Regional Cultures of North America.

=== Streams ===
The Allegheny and Kiskiminetas rivers; Buffalo, Crooked, Cowanshannock, Redbank, and Mahoning creeks; and Carnahan Run, among others, have watersheds within the county. The Murphy, Nicholson, Ross, and Cogley islands are in the Allegheny in Armstrong County.

==== Scrubgrass Creek ====
Scrubgrass Creek arises in Wayne Township and flows through Boggs Township, passing Goheenville, to Pine Township where it empties into the Mahoning Creek at Mahoning Station.

==== Sugar Creek ====
Sugar Creek flows through Bradys Bend Township where it empties into the Allegheny River. Its tributaries include Cove Run, Hart Run, Holder Run, Long Run, Pine Run, and Whiskey Run.

=== Adjacent counties ===
- Clarion County (north)
- Jefferson County (northeast)
- Indiana County (east)
- Westmoreland County (south)
- Allegheny County (southwest)
- Butler County (west)

=== Major highways ===
- US 422
- PA 28
- PA 56
- PA 58
- PA 66
- PA 68
- PA 85
- PA 128
- PA 156
- PA 210
- PA 268
- PA 356
- PA 368
- PA 536
- PA 839

=== Climate ===
Armstrong County has a hot-summer humid continental climate (Dfa). Average monthly temperatures in Kittanning range from 27.3 °F in January to 72.6 °F in July.

== Demographics ==
Historical population
| Census | Pop. | Note | %± |
|---|---|---|---|
| 1800 | 2,399 | | — |
| 1810 | 6,143 | | 156.1% |
| 1820 | 10,324 | | 68.1% |
| 1830 | 17,701 | | 71.5% |
| 1840 | 28,365 | | 60.2% |
| 1850 | 29,560 | | 4.2% |
| 1860 | 35,797 | | 21.1% |
| 1870 | 43,382 | | 21.2% |
| 1880 | 47,641 | | 9.8% |
| 1890 | 46,747 | | −1.9% |
| 1900 | 52,551 | | 12.4% |
| 1910 | 67,880 | | 29.2% |
| 1920 | 75,568 | | 11.3% |
| 1930 | 79,298 | | 4.9% |
| 1940 | 81,087 | | 2.3% |
| 1950 | 80,842 | | −0.3% |
| 1960 | 79,524 | | −1.6% |
| 1970 | 75,590 | | −4.9% |
| 1980 | 77,768 | | 2.9% |
| 1990 | 73,478 | | −5.5% |
| 2000 | 72,392 | | −1.5% |
| 2010 | 68,941 | | −4.8% |
| 2020 | 65,558 | | −4.9% |
| 2025 (est.) | 63,698 | ▼ | −2.8% |
U.S. Decennial Census; 1790-1960 1900-1990; 1990-2000 2010-2017

=== 2020 census ===
As of the 2020 census, the county had a population of 65,558 and a median age of 47.3 years. 18.9% of residents were under the age of 18 and 22.8% were 65 years of age or older. For every 100 females there were 99.5 males, and for every 100 females age 18 and over there were 97.9 males age 18 and over.

The racial makeup of the county was 95.4% White, 0.7% Black or African American, 0.1% American Indian and Alaska Native, 0.2% Asian, <0.1% Native Hawaiian and Pacific Islander, 0.3% from some other race, and 3.3% from two or more races. Hispanic or Latino residents of any race comprised 0.7% of the population.

Detailed racial composition counts are shown in the table below.

Armstrong County, Pennsylvania – Racial and ethnic composition Note: the US Census treats Hispanic/Latino as an ethnic category. This table excludes Latinos from the racial categories and assigns them to a separate category. Hispanics/Latinos may be of any race.
| Race / Ethnicity (NH = Non-Hispanic) | Pop 2000 | Pop 2010 | Pop 2020 | % 2000 | % 2010 | % 2020 |
|---|---|---|---|---|---|---|
| White alone (NH) | 70,976 | 67,326 | 62,320 | 98.04% | 97.65% | 95.06% |
| Black or African American alone (NH) | 578 | 540 | 438 | 0.79% | 0.78% | 0.66% |
| Native American or Alaska Native alone (NH) | 64 | 41 | 57 | 0.08% | 0.05% | 0.08% |
| Asian alone (NH) | 82 | 147 | 147 | 0.11% | 0.21% | 0.22% |
| Pacific Islander alone (NH) | 12 | 8 | 14 | 0.01% | 0.01% | 0.02% |
| Other race alone (NH) | 39 | 25 | 120 | 0.05% | 0.03% | 0.18% |
| Mixed race or Multiracial (NH) | 333 | 488 | 1,972 | 0.45% | 0.70% | 3.00% |
| Hispanic or Latino (any race) | 308 | 366 | 490 | 0.42% | 0.53% | 0.74% |
| Total | 72,392 | 68,941 | 65,558 | 100.00% | 100.00% | 100.00% |

35.1% of residents lived in urban areas, while 64.9% lived in rural areas.

There were 28,061 households in the county, of which 24.0% had children under the age of 18 living in them. Of all households, 49.4% were married-couple households, 19.3% were households with a male householder and no spouse or partner present, and 24.1% were households with a female householder and no spouse or partner present. About 29.7% of all households were made up of individuals and 14.9% had someone living alone who was 65 years of age or older.

There were 32,106 housing units, of which 12.6% were vacant. Among occupied housing units, 75.1% were owner-occupied and 24.9% were renter-occupied. The homeowner vacancy rate was 1.4% and the rental vacancy rate was 7.4%.

=== 2000 census ===
As of the census of 2000, there were 72,392 people, 29,005 households, and 20,535 families residing in the county. The population density was 111 people per square mile (43 people/km^{2}). There were 32,387 housing units at an average density of 50 per square mile (19/km^{2}). The racial makeup of the county was 98.32% White, 0.82% Black or African American, 0.09% Native American, 0.12% Asian, 0.02% Pacific Islander, 0.13% from other races, and 0.50% from two or more races. 0.43% of the population were Hispanic or Latino of any race. 34.6% were of German, 10.8% Italian, 9.3% Irish, 8.7% American, 7.4% English and 5.7% Polish ancestry.

There were 29,005 households, out of which 29.50% had children under the age of 18 living with them, 57.90% were married couples living together, 9.00% had a female householder with no husband present, and 29.20% were non-families. 25.90% of all households were made up of individuals, and 13.70% had someone living alone who was 65 years of age or older. The average household size was 2.46 and the average family size was 2.95.

The distribution of the age of the population in the county was 22.90% under the age of 18, 7.20% from 18 to 24, 27.60% from 25 to 44, 24.20% from 45 to 64, and 18.00% who were 65 years of age or older. The median age was 40 years. For every 100 females, there were 94.70 males. For every 100 females age 18 and over, there were 92.10 males.

== Government and politics ==
United States presidential election results for Armstrong County, Pennsylvania
| Year | Republican | | Democratic | | Third party(ies) | |
| Year | No. | % | No. | % | No. | % |
|---|---|---|---|---|---|---|
| 1888 | 5,030 | 55.89% | 3,763 | 41.81% | 207 | 2.30% |
| 1892 | 4,709 | 55.60% | 3,512 | 41.46% | 249 | 2.94% |
| 1896 | 6,325 | 61.12% | 3,825 | 36.96% | 199 | 1.92% |
| 1900 | 6,443 | 63.58% | 3,438 | 33.93% | 252 | 2.49% |
| 1904 | 5,798 | 67.94% | 2,270 | 26.60% | 466 | 5.46% |
| 1908 | 6,110 | 59.67% | 3,212 | 31.37% | 917 | 8.96% |
| 1912 | 1,904 | 18.91% | 3,027 | 30.06% | 5,139 | 51.03% |
| 1916 | 6,024 | 58.51% | 3,590 | 34.87% | 682 | 6.62% |
| 1920 | 8,995 | 69.23% | 3,262 | 25.11% | 735 | 5.66% |
| 1924 | 11,192 | 64.18% | 2,931 | 16.81% | 3,316 | 19.01% |
| 1928 | 17,625 | 77.86% | 4,824 | 21.31% | 187 | 0.83% |
| 1932 | 10,884 | 52.10% | 9,230 | 44.18% | 776 | 3.71% |
| 1936 | 14,198 | 46.65% | 15,955 | 52.42% | 281 | 0.92% |
| 1940 | 14,524 | 54.30% | 12,144 | 45.40% | 82 | 0.31% |
| 1944 | 13,656 | 56.94% | 10,202 | 42.54% | 126 | 0.53% |
| 1948 | 11,712 | 53.45% | 9,900 | 45.18% | 300 | 1.37% |
| 1952 | 16,955 | 55.90% | 13,221 | 43.59% | 153 | 0.50% |
| 1956 | 20,055 | 61.22% | 12,671 | 38.68% | 34 | 0.10% |
| 1960 | 19,883 | 57.23% | 14,799 | 42.59% | 63 | 0.18% |
| 1964 | 10,618 | 33.40% | 21,098 | 66.37% | 74 | 0.23% |
| 1968 | 14,132 | 46.56% | 13,921 | 45.86% | 2,300 | 7.58% |
| 1972 | 17,557 | 61.61% | 10,490 | 36.81% | 451 | 1.58% |
| 1976 | 13,378 | 46.05% | 15,179 | 52.25% | 493 | 1.70% |
| 1980 | 12,955 | 47.80% | 12,718 | 46.92% | 1,431 | 5.28% |
| 1984 | 13,709 | 48.37% | 14,525 | 51.25% | 110 | 0.39% |
| 1988 | 11,509 | 44.81% | 13,892 | 54.09% | 282 | 1.10% |
| 1992 | 9,122 | 32.20% | 12,995 | 45.87% | 6,216 | 21.94% |
| 1996 | 11,052 | 42.87% | 11,130 | 43.17% | 3,597 | 13.95% |
| 2000 | 15,508 | 56.55% | 11,127 | 40.58% | 788 | 2.87% |
| 2004 | 18,925 | 60.86% | 12,025 | 38.67% | 147 | 0.47% |
| 2008 | 18,542 | 61.27% | 11,138 | 36.80% | 583 | 1.93% |
| 2012 | 20,142 | 67.77% | 9,045 | 30.43% | 534 | 1.80% |
| 2016 | 23,484 | 73.70% | 7,178 | 22.53% | 1,202 | 3.77% |
| 2020 | 27,489 | 75.47% | 8,457 | 23.22% | 480 | 1.32% |
| 2024 | 28,296 | 76.05% | 8,553 | 22.99% | 360 | 0.97% |

=== Voter registration ===
As of 25 September 2023, there were 40,716 registered voters in the county. The Republican Party accounts for a majority of the voters. There were 25,058 registered Republicans, 11,131 registered Democrats, 2,968 unaffiliated voters and 1,559 voters registered to other parties.

Chart of Voter Registration
1. Republican (61.5%)
2. Democratic (27.3%)
3. Independent (7.29%)
4. Third Party (3.83%)

Voter registration and party enrollment
| Party | Number of voters | Percentage |
|---|---|---|
| Republican | 25,058 | 61.54% |
| Democratic | 11,131 | 27.34% |
| Independent | 2,968 | 7.29% |
| Third Party | 1,559 | 3.83% |
| Total | 40,716 | 100% |

=== County government ===
County Commissioners:

- John Strate (Republican), Chairman
- Anthony Shea (Republican), Vice-Chairman
- Pat Fabian (Democrat), Secretary

District Attorney:

- Katie Charlton (Republican)

Sheriff:

- Frank Pitzer (Republican)

Coroner:

- Brian Myers (Republican)

Controller:

- Myra "Tammy" Miller (Republican)

Treasurer:

- Amanda Hiles (Republican)

Register of Wills and Recorder of Deeds:

- Lori Hirst (Republican)

Prothonotary and Clerk of Courts:

- Annette Bowser (Republican)

Judges:

- Kenneth G. Valasek, Senior Judge (Democrat)
- Chase McClister, President Judge (Democrat)

=== Governor ===
- Josh Shapiro, Democratic, 48thPennsylvania Governor

Pennsylvania Gubernatorial election results for Armstrong County
| Year | Republican | | Democratic | | Third party(ies) | |
| Year | No. | % | No. | % | No. | % |
|---|---|---|---|---|---|---|
| 1872 | 4,434 | 56.03% | 3,469 | 43.83% | 11 | 0.14% |
| 1875 | 3,522 | 51.20% | 3,326 | 48.35% | 31 | 0.45% |
| 1878 | 3,207 | 41.05% | 2,693 | 34.47% | 1,912 | 24.48% |
| 1882 | 3,450 | 46.85% | 3,174 | 43.10% | 740 | 10.05% |
| 1886 | 3,980 | 52.60% | 3,240 | 42.82% | 346 | 4.57% |
| 1890 | 4,161 | 51.81% | 3,774 | 46.99% | 96 | 1.20% |
| 1894 | 4,808 | 64.50% | 2,426 | 32.55% | 220 | 2.95% |
| 1898 | 4,043 | 51.92% | 3,239 | 41.59% | 505 | 6.49% |
| 1902 | 4,756 | 56.51% | 3,469 | 41.22% | 191 | 2.27% |
| 1906 | 4,893 | 57.52% | 3,235 | 38.03% | 378 | 4.44% |
| 1910 | 3,673 | 45.41% | 550 | 6.80% | 3,865 | 47.79% |
| 1914 | 3,423 | 40.05% | 2,682 | 31.38% | 2,442 | 28.57% |
| 1918 | 4,098 | 68.60% | 1,414 | 23.67% | 462 | 7.73% |
| 1922 | 5,082 | 54.89% | 3,905 | 42.18% | 271 | 2.93% |
| 1926 | 7,865 | 80.68% | 1,533 | 15.73% | 350 | 3.59% |
| 1930 | 11,222 | 72.12% | 3,162 | 20.32% | 1,177 | 7.56% |
| 1934 | 9,734 | 50.20% | 9,343 | 48.18% | 314 | 1.62% |
| 1938 | 12,670 | 62.08% | 7,450 | 36.50% | 290 | 1.42% |
| 1942 | 8,922 | 44.01% | 5,915 | 29.18% | 5,435 | 26.81% |
| 1946 | 10,962 | 64.23% | 5,915 | 34.66% | 190 | 1.11% |
| 1950 | 12,039 | 54.33% | 9,794 | 44.20% | 324 | 1.46% |
| 1954 | 11,771 | 54.48% | 9,794 | 45.33% | 40 | 0.19% |
| 1958 | 16,499 | 55.83% | 12,920 | 43.72% | 133 | 0.45% |
| 1962 | 18,779 | 59.43% | 12,668 | 40.09% | 151 | 0.48% |
| 1966 | 14,663 | 53.35% | 12,497 | 45.47% | 322 | 1.17% |
| 1970 | 9,375 | 39.08% | 14,186 | 59.13% | 430 | 1.79% |
| 1974 | 12,372 | 49.25% | 12,566 | 50.02% | 185 | 0.74% |
| 1978 | 9,665 | 40.25% | 14,263 | 59.39% | 86 | 0.36% |
| 1982 | 11,010 | 46.38% | 12,563 | 52.92% | 165 | 0.70% |
| 1986 | 9,376 | 44.15% | 11,635 | 54.79% | 225 | 1.06% |
| 1990 | 6,192 | 30.55% | 14,077 | 69.45% | 0 | 0.00% |
| 1994 | 8,821 | 40.52% | 7,944 | 36.49% | 5,007 | 23.00% |
| 1998 | 8,641 | 48.71% | 4,900 | 27.62% | 4,197 | 23.66% |
| 2002 | 11,898 | 58.43% | 7,965 | 39.11% | 501 | 2.46% |
| 2006 | 13,595 | 58.73% | 9,552 | 41.27% | 0 | 0.00% |
| 2010 | 16,096 | 70.94% | 6,595 | 29.06% | 0 | 0.00% |
| 2014 | 11,520 | 61.55% | 7,195 | 38.45% | 0 | 0.00% |
| 2018 | 15,373 | 62.38% | 8,839 | 35.87% | 431 | 1.75% |
| 2022 | 18,419 | 64.73% | 9,523 | 33.46% | 515 | 1.81% |

=== State senate ===
- Joseph A. Pittman, Republican, Pennsylvania's 41st Senatorial District

=== State House Of Representatives ===
- Abby Major, Republican, Pennsylvania's 60th Representative District
- Josh Bashline, Republican, Pennsylvania's 63rd Representative District

=== United States House of Representatives ===
- Glenn Thompson, Republican, Pennsylvania's 15th congressional district

=== United States Senate ===
- Dave McCormick, Republican
- John Fetterman, Democrat

United States Senate election results for Armstrong County, Pennsylvania1
| Year | Republican | | Democratic | | Third party(ies) | |
| Year | No. | % | No. | % | No. | % |
|---|---|---|---|---|---|---|
| 1916 | 5,342 | 52.24% | 3,612 | 35.32% | 1,272 | 12.44% |
| 1922 | 7,645 | 58.29% | 3,104 | 23.67% | 2,367 | 18.05% |
| 1922 | 7,824 | 59.45% | 3,121 | 23.71% | 2,216 | 16.84% |
| 1928 | 15,210 | 74.72% | 4,680 | 22.99% | 465 | 2.28% |
| 1934 | 12,351 | 53.46% | 9,455 | 40.92% | 1,299 | 5.62% |
| 1940 | 15,221 | 50.47% | 14,586 | 48.36% | 352 | 1.17% |
| 1946 | 12,987 | 63.80% | 7,163 | 35.19% | 206 | 1.01% |
| 1952 | 18,522 | 59.59% | 12,302 | 39.58% | 258 | 0.83% |
| 1958 | 14,570 | 53.77% | 12,416 | 45.82% | 109 | 0.40% |
| 1964 | 15,424 | 48.23% | 16,444 | 51.42% | 113 | 0.35% |
| 1970 | 11,940 | 52.21% | 10,503 | 45.93% | 425 | 1.86% |
| 1976 | 10,750 | 47.72% | 11,532 | 51.20% | 243 | 1.08% |
| 1982 | 13,854 | 58.11% | 9,684 | 40.62% | 301 | 1.26% |
| 1988 | 15,622 | 66.49% | 7,651 | 32.56% | 224 | 0.95% |
| 1991 | 10,724 | 44.92% | 12,968 | 54.33% | 179 | 0.75% |
| 1994 | 11,194 | 51.03% | 9,513 | 43.37% | 1,229 | 5.60% |
| 2000 | 15,388 | 55.96% | 11,380 | 41.38% | 730 | 2.65% |
| 2006 | 11,499 | 49.89% | 11,549 | 50.11% | 0 | 0.00% |
| 2012 | 19,442 | 65.88% | 9,496 | 32.18% | 574 | 1.94% |
| 2018 | 15,449 | 62.70% | 8,570 | 34.78% | 620 | 2.52% |
| 2024 | 26,653 | 72.14% | 9,136 | 24.73% | 1,155 | 3.13% |

United States Senate election results for Armstrong County, Pennsylvania3
| Year | Republican | | Democratic | | Third party(ies) | |
| Year | No. | % | No. | % | No. | % |
|---|---|---|---|---|---|---|
| 1914 | 4,124 | 38.80% | 3,114 | 29.29% | 3,392 | 31.91% |
| 1920 | 8,942 | 67.45% | 2,821 | 21.28% | 1,494 | 11.27% |
| 1926 | 7,422 | 62.18% | 2,103 | 17.62% | 2,411 | 20.20% |
| 1930 | 9,431 | 64.22% | 4,112 | 28.00% | 1,142 | 7.78% |
| 1932 | 10,432 | 48.11% | 9,211 | 42.48% | 2,042 | 9.42% |
| 1938 | 14,592 | 55.41% | 11,211 | 42.57% | 531 | 2.02% |
| 1944 | 12,382 | 52.93% | 10,951 | 46.81% | 62 | 0.27% |
| 1950 | 13,294 | 56.44% | 10,031 | 42.58% | 231 | 0.98% |
| 1956 | 16,104 | 54.20% | 13,492 | 45.41% | 114 | 0.38% |
| 1962 | 14,198 | 53.53% | 12,214 | 46.05% | 110 | 0.41% |
| 1968 | 14,354 | 51.83% | 12,822 | 46.29% | 521 | 1.88% |
| 1974 | 11,043 | 52.22% | 9,723 | 45.98% | 382 | 1.81% |
| 1980 | 14,534 | 53.38% | 11,942 | 43.86% | 752 | 2.76% |
| 1986 | 12,192 | 57.16% | 8,913 | 41.79% | 224 | 1.05% |
| 1992 | 13,979 | 49.75% | 12,206 | 43.44% | 1,916 | 6.82% |
| 1998 | 11,748 | 65.87% | 5,212 | 29.22% | 876 | 4.91% |
| 2004 | 17,471 | 56.88% | 9,796 | 31.89% | 3,449 | 11.23% |
| 2010 | 14,693 | 65.32% | 7,800 | 34.68% | 0 | 0.00% |
| 2016 | 20,793 | 66.22% | 8,387 | 26.71% | 2,220 | 7.07% |
| 2022 | 19,575 | 68.89% | 8,065 | 28.38% | 773 | 2.72% |

== Education ==
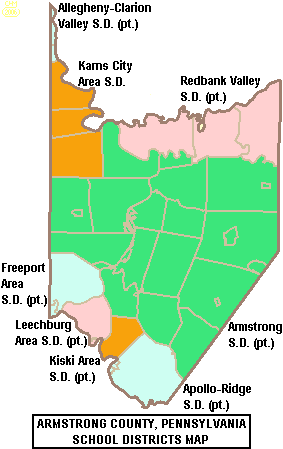
Map of Armstrong County, Pennsylvania Public School Districts

=== Colleges and universities ===
- Indiana University of Pennsylvania Northpointe - South Buffalo Township
- Butler County Community College @ Armstrong - Ford City

=== Public school districts ===
K-12 school districts include:

- Allegheny-Clarion Valley School District (part)
- Apollo-Ridge School District
- Armstrong School District (part, 2 high schools)
- Freeport Area School District (part)
- Karns City Area School District
- Kiski Area School District (part)
- Leechburg Area School District (part)
- Redbank Valley School District (part)

=== Technology school ===
- Lenape Technical School - Ford City

=== Private schools ===
As reported by the Pennsylvania Department of Education - EdNA. April 2012.

- Adelphoi Village Miller Home - Apollo
- Divine Redeemer School - Ford City
- Dry Knob Amish School - Smicksburg
- Evangelical Lutheran School - Worthington
- Grace Christian School - Kittanning
- Meadow View School - Dayton
- Model Education Program - Kittanning
- New Bethlehem Wesleyan Methodist School - New Bethlehem
- Orchard Hills Christian Academy - Apollo
- Owl Hollow Amish School - Smicksburg
- Shady Lane Amish School - Smicksburg
- Shady Run Amish School - Smicksburg
- Stony Acres Amish School - Smicksburg
- Stony Flat Amish School - Smicksburg
- United Cerebral Palsy Of Western Pennsylvania - Spring Church
- Whippoorwill School - Smicksburg
- Worthington Baptist Christian School - Worthington

=== Libraries ===
There are six public libraries in Armstrong County:

- Apollo Memorial Library - Apollo, PA
- Ford City Public Library - Ford City, PA
- Freeport Area Library - Freeport, PA
- Kittanning Public Library - Kittanning, PA
- Leechburg Public Library - Leechburg, PA
- Worthington West Franklin Community Library - Worthington, PA

== Communities ==
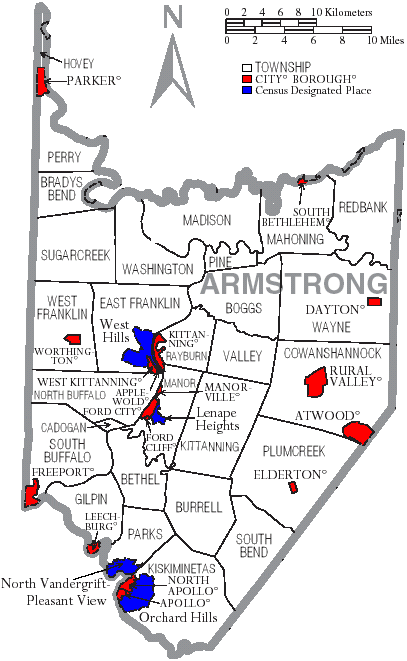
Map of Armstrong County, Pennsylvania with municipal labels showing cities and boroughs (in red), townships (in white), and census-designated places (in blue)

Under Pennsylvania law, there are four types of incorporated municipalities: cities, boroughs, townships, and, in at most two cases, towns. The following cities, boroughs and townships are located in Armstrong County:

=== City ===
- Parker

=== Boroughs ===
- Apollo
- Applewold
- Atwood
- Dayton
- Elderton
- Ford City
- Ford Cliff
- Freeport
- Kittanning (county seat)
- Leechburg
- Manorville
- North Apollo
- Rural Valley
- South Bethlehem
- West Kittanning
- Worthington

=== Townships ===
- Bethel
- Boggs
- Bradys Bend
- Burrell
- Cadogan
- Cowanshannock
- East Franklin
- Gilpin
- Hovey
- Kiskiminetas
- Kittanning
- Madison
- Mahoning
- Manor
- North Buffalo
- Parks
- Perry
- Pine
- Plumcreek
- Rayburn
- Redbank
- South Bend
- South Buffalo
- Sugarcreek
- Valley
- Washington
- Wayne
- West Franklin

=== Census-designated places ===
Census-designated places are geographical areas designated by the U.S. Census Bureau for the purposes of compiling demographic data. They are not actual jurisdictions under Pennsylvania law. Other unincorporated communities, such as villages, may be listed here as well.

- Kiskimere
- Lenape Heights
- North Vandergrift
- Orchard Hills
- Pleasant View
- Templeton
- West Hills

=== Unincorporated community ===
- Adrian
- Belknap
- Chickasaw
- Climax
- Clinton
- Cowansville
- Craigsville
- Deanville
- Dee
- Distant
- Echo
- Eddyville
- Frogtown
- Girty
- Goheenville
- Gosford
- Greendale
- Hooks
- Idaho
- Kellersburg
- Mahoning Furnace
- Maysville
- McCrea Furnace
- McGrann
- McGregor
- McVille
- McWilliams
- Milton
- Mosgrove
- Mount Tabor
- Muff
- New Salem
- Nu Mine
- Oak Ridge
- Oscar
- Pine Furnace
- Putneyville
- Rimer
- Sagamore
- Schenley
- Seminole
- Shady Plain
- Slabtown
- Spring Church
- Tidal
- West Valley
- Widnoon
- Yatesboro
- Yellow Dog Village

=== Former communities ===
- Adams
- Barnard
- Johnetta

=== Population ranking ===
The population ranking of the following table is based on the 2010 census of Armstrong County.

† county seat

| Rank | City/Town/etc. | Population (2010 Census) | Municipal type | Incorporated |
|---|---|---|---|---|
| 1 | † Kittanning | 4,044 | Borough | 1803 |
| 2 | Ford City | 2,991 | Borough | 1889 |
| 3 | Leechburg | 2,156 | Borough | 1850 |
| 4 | Orchard Hills | 1,952 | CDP | |
| 5 | Freeport | 1,813 | Borough | 1833 |
| 6 | Apollo | 1,647 | Borough | 1848 |
| 7 | North Apollo | 1,297 | Borough | |
| 8 | West Hills | 1,263 | CDP | |
| 9 | West Kittanning | 1,175 | Borough | 1900 |
| 10 | Lenape Heights | 1,167 | CDP | |
| 11 | Rural Valley | 876 | Borough | |
| 12 | Parker | 840 | City | 1873 |
| 13 | Pleasant View | 780 | CDP | |
| 14 | Worthington | 639 | Borough | 1855 |
| 15 | Dayton | 553 | Borough | 1873 |
| 16 | South Bethlehem | 481 | Borough | |
| 17 | North Vandergrift | 447 | CDP | |
| 18 | Manorville | 410 | Borough | |
| 19 | Ford Cliff | 371 | Borough | 1922 |
| 20 | Elderton | 356 | Borough | 1859 |
| 21 | Templeton | 325 | CDP | |
| 22 | Applewold | 310 | Borough | 1899 |
| 23 | Kiskimere | 136 | CDP | |
| 24 | Atwood | 107 | Borough | 1884 |

== Notable people ==
=== Politics ===
John Armstrong Sr. - namesake of Armstrong County, civil engineer, American military general, Battle of Kittanning

William F. Johnston - Armstrong County Bar Association, abolitionist, 11th Governor of Pennsylvania 1848–1852, namesake of Johnston Ave. in Kittanning

Joseph Buffington - Judge, US Court of Appeals for the Third Circuit, US Circuit Courts for the Third Circuit, and US District Judge of the United States District Court for the Western District of Pennsylvania

John R. Phillips, Leechburg native, U.S. Ambassador to Italy

Andrew Jackson Faulk - born in Kittanning, third Governor of the Dakota Territory

George L. Shoup, First governor of Idaho, United States senator

US Congress: Samuel S. Harrison, Joseph Buffington Sr., Darwin Phelps, David Barclay, Joseph Grant Beale Daniel Brodhead Heiner, Jason Altmire

PA State Senators: Eben Kelley, Donald C. White, Albert Pechan

PA State Legislature: John S. Rhey, J. Alexander Fulton, John K. Calhoun, Franklin Mechling, Samuel B. Cochran, Timothy Pesci, Jeff Pyle, Abby Major

PA Supreme Court: James Thompson

John Gilpin - PA Constitutional Convention of 1873; namesake for Gilpin Township

John F. Hunter, Ohio state legislature

=== Military ===
Donald R. Lobaugh, Freeport native, U.S. Army soldier and Medal of Honor recipient in World War II

Raymond Harvey, Ford City native, Medal of Honor recipient in Korean War

=== Science ===
David Alter - Freeport, PA medical doctor; scientist; inventor of spectrum analysis, the idea that every element has its own emission spectrum: a breakthrough development in spectroscopy. The published article was: On Certain Physical Properties of Light Produced by the Combustion of Different Metals in an Electric Spark Refracted by a Prism published 1854

=== Sports ===
Ed Hobaugh - Kittanning native, MLB baseball player from Kittanning; right-hand pitcher for Washington Senators 1961-63

Mickey Morandini, Leechburg an MLB second baseman and coach, who played for the Philadelphia Phillies, Chicago Cubs, and Toronto Blue Jays. His career highlights include selection as a 1995 National League (NL) All-Star, playing for the Phillies in the 1993 NL Championship Series and World Series, and appearing for the Cubs in the 1998 NL Division Series. Also played for USA baseball in the 1988 Olympic Games is Seoul.

Dick Starr, major league pitcher, 1947–1951, New York Yankees, Washington Senators

Steve Souchock, MLB baseball plater from Yatesboro who played for the New York Yankees and Detroit Tigers (1946-1955)

Mike Goliat, MLB baseball player from Yatesboro who played for the Philadelphia Phillies (1948-1951) and the Saint Louis Brown (1951-1952)

Rudy Minarcin MLB baseball pitcher from North Vandergrift who played for the Cincinnati Redlegs and Boston Red Sox (1955-1957)

Red Bowser, Freeport native, outfielder in Major League Baseball

Broc Hepler - Kittanning native, professional motocross racer

Ryan Hemphill, Apollo native, NASCAR driver

Jackie Wilson, Leechburg, National Boxing Association World Featherweight Champion

Alex Kroll, Leechburg native, professional football player for New York Titans (later Jets) and CEO of Young & Rubicam

Jack Lambert - American football 4-time Super Bowl champion All-Pro linebacker for the Pittsburgh Steelers

Eric Ravotti, Freeport native, former NFL (Steeler) linebacker

Mitch Frerotte - an American professional football player who played as a guard for four seasons with the Buffalo Bills.

Gus Frerotte - former American football quarterback. He was drafted by the Washington Redskins in the seventh round of the 1994 NFL Draft. He played college football at Tulsa.

Bud Carson, former NFL coach, Steelers Defensive Coordinator for first two Super Bowl wins, helped develop the "Steel Curtain"

Greg Christy, played at Freeport High School, American football player, Buffalo Bills

Jeff Christy, played at Freeport High School, American football player, center for the Arizona Cardinals, the Minnesota Vikings, and the Tampa Bay Buccaneers from 1992 to 2003

Nick Bowers, NFL tight end for the Las Vegas Raiders, Kittanning native

Tim Levcik, American football player

Zigmund "Red" Mihalik, Hall of Fame basketball official

=== Other ===
Teri Hope, actress

Ralph Patt, jazz guitarist

Don Taylor, actor and director

Nellie Bly, Apollo native, journalist and adventurer, widely known for her record-breaking trip around the world in 72 days and investigative journalism

David Coulter, banker

S.K. McClafferty, author.

Marcy Graham Waldenville, author.

== See also ==
- List of counties in Pennsylvania
- National Register of Historic Places listings in Armstrong County, Pennsylvania
