= Putneyville, Armstrong County, Pennsylvania =

Unincorporated community in Pennsylvania, US

Putneyville, Pennsylvania
- Unincorporated community
- Location within Pennsylvania
- Coordinates: 40°56′48″N 79°19′03″W
- Country: United States
- State: Pennsylvania
- County: Armstrong
- Township: Mahoning
- Elevation: 984 ft (300 m)
- Time zone: UTC-5 (Eastern (EST))
  - Summer (DST): UTC-4 (EDT)
- GNIS feature ID: 1184507

Putneyville is an unincorporated community in Mahoning Township, Armstrong County, Pennsylvania, United States.

== History ==
A post office called Putneyville was established in 1844 and remained in operation until 1970.
