= McGregor, Armstrong County, Pennsylvania =

Unincorporated community in Pennsylvania, US

McGregor, Pennsylvania
- Unincorporated community
- Location within Pennsylvania
- Coordinates: 40°56′17″N 79°13′13″W
- Country: United States
- State: Pennsylvania
- County: Armstrong
- Township: Redbank
- Elevation: 1,594 ft (486 m)
- Time zone: UTC-5 (Eastern (EST))
  - Summer (DST): UTC-4 (EDT)
- GNIS feature ID: 1209245

McGregor is an unincorporated community in Redbank Township, Armstrong County, Pennsylvania, United States. The community lies along PA-839 at the junction with Porter Rd.

== History ==
A post office called McGregor was established in 1904 and remained in operation until 1905.
