= Eddyville, Pennsylvania =

Unincorporated community in Pennsylvania, US

- Unincorporated community
- Location within Pennsylvania
- Coordinates: 40°56′34″N 79°16′39″W
- Country: United States
- State: Pennsylvania
- County: Armstrong
- Township: Redbank
- Elevation: 1,004 ft (306 m)
- Time zone: UTC-5 (Eastern (EST))
  - Summer (DST): UTC-4 (EDT)
- GNIS feature ID: 1173986

Eddyville is an unincorporated community in Redbank Township, Armstrong County, Pennsylvania, United States.

== History ==
A post office called Eddyville was established on May 21, 1857, Turney S. Orr, postmaster, and remained in operation until 1907. Eddyville is described as a small town containing besides a gristmill about a dozen other buildings, and including a blacksmith shop, a store, a boatyard, and a post office. Eddyville appears in the 1876 Atlas of Armstrong County, Pennsylvania.
