= Widnoon, Pennsylvania =

Unincorporated community in Pennsylvania, US

- Unincorporated community
- Location within Pennsylvania
- Coordinates: 40°57′40″N 79°28′02″W
- Country: United States
- State: Pennsylvania
- County: Armstrong
- Township: Madison
- Elevation: 1,434 ft (437 m)
- Time zone: UTC-5 (Eastern (EST))
  - Summer (DST): UTC-4 (EDT)
- ZIP code: 16261
- Area code: 724
- GNIS feature ID: 1191376

Widnoon is an unincorporated community located near the center of Madison Township, Armstrong County, Pennsylvania, United States. The community is 3 miles (4.8 km) north of Templeton. Widnoon had its own post office from March 22, 1880, to February 3, 2005. It still has its own ZIP code, 16261.

== History ==
Duncanville, later called Widnoon, appears in the 1876 Atlas of Armstrong County, Pennsylvania. Duncanville was named after James Duncan who established a store there in 1854.

The United Brethren and the Presbyterians had organized churches here and houses of worship in 1878 which were no longer in use by 1913.

Widnoon lies on tract No. 314, covered by warrant 2868, called "Elliott Grove," which adjoined the original line between Toby and Red Bank townships on the east. This tract was originally owned by Willink & Co., Wilhelm Willink being one of several Dutch investors in the Holland Land Company.
