= Shady Plain, Pennsylvania =

Unincorporated community in Pennsylvania, US

Shady Plain
- Unincorporated community
- Location within the state of Pennsylvania Shady Plain (the United States)
- Coordinates: 40°36′43″N 79°26′17″W
- Country: United States
- State: Pennsylvania
- County: Armstrong
- Township: Kiskiminetas
- Elevation: 1,309 ft (399 m)
- Time zone: UTC-5 (Eastern (EST))
  - Summer (DST): UTC-4 (EDT)
- GNIS feature ID: 1187309

Shady Plain is an unincorporated community located within Kiskiminetas Township, Armstrong County, Pennsylvania, United States.
