= Idaho, Pennsylvania =

Unincorporated community in Pennsylvania, US

- Unincorporated community
- Location within Pennsylvania
- Coordinates: 40°39′13″N 79°20′49″W
- Country: United States
- State: Pennsylvania
- County: Armstrong
- Township: South Bend
- Elevation: 994 ft (303 m)
- Time zone: UTC-5 (Eastern (EST))
  - Summer (DST): UTC-4 (EDT)
- GNIS feature ID: 1177681

Idaho is an unincorporated community in South Bend Township, Armstrong County, Pennsylvania, United States.

== History ==
Early settlers of the community later called Idaho include Absalom Woodward, who built a grist mill and a saw mill on the south side of Plum Creek, near its junction with Crooked Creek, by 1811 when he was first assessed with them. Reuben Allshouse, who owned these mills in 1876, gave the surrounding community the name "Idaho" in recognition of that western state as the source of his fortune.

Absalom Woodward also kept the only post office between Kittanning and Indiana in those days at that place. It remained in operation until 1824, when the post office at Elderton opened.

For many years after the settlement of this region, the only church edifice was the log one built in 1818 by Absalom Woodward and generously donated to the public at large. In this and in private houses and barns, itinerant missionaries conducted services for many years.

Idaho appears in the 1876 Atlas of Armstrong County, Pennsylvania.
