= West Valley, Pennsylvania =

Unincorporated community in Pennsylvania, US

- Unincorporated community
- Location within Pennsylvania
- Coordinates: 40°50′10″N 79°25′23″W
- Country: United States
- State: Pennsylvania
- County: Armstrong
- Elevation: 1,391 ft (424 m)
- Time zone: UTC-5 (Eastern (EST))
  - Summer (DST): UTC-4 (EDT)
- Area code: 724
- GNIS feature ID: 1191124

West Valley is an unincorporated community in Armstrong County, Pennsylvania, United States.
