= New Salem, Armstrong County, Pennsylvania =

Unincorporated community in Pennsylvania, US

New Salem, Pennsylvania
- Unincorporated community
- Location within Pennsylvania
- Coordinates: 40°59′17″N 79°14′39″W
- Country: United States
- State: Pennsylvania
- County: Armstrong
- Township: Redbank
- Elevation: 1,407 ft (429 m)
- Time zone: UTC-5 (Eastern (EST))
  - Summer (DST): UTC-4 (EDT)
- GNIS feature ID: 1182366

New Salem is an unincorporated community in Redbank Township, Armstrong County, Pennsylvania, United States. It has also been known as Salem. The community is 24.1 miles (38.8 km) northeast of Kittanning and 7.1 miles (11.4 km) east of New Bethlehem.

== History ==
New Salem was laid out between 1850 and 1853. New Salem appears in the 1876 Atlas of Armstrong County, Pennsylvania. A post office called Pierce was established in 1853 and remained in operation until 1932.
