= Templeton, Pennsylvania =

Unincorporated community in Pennsylvania, US

- Census-designated place
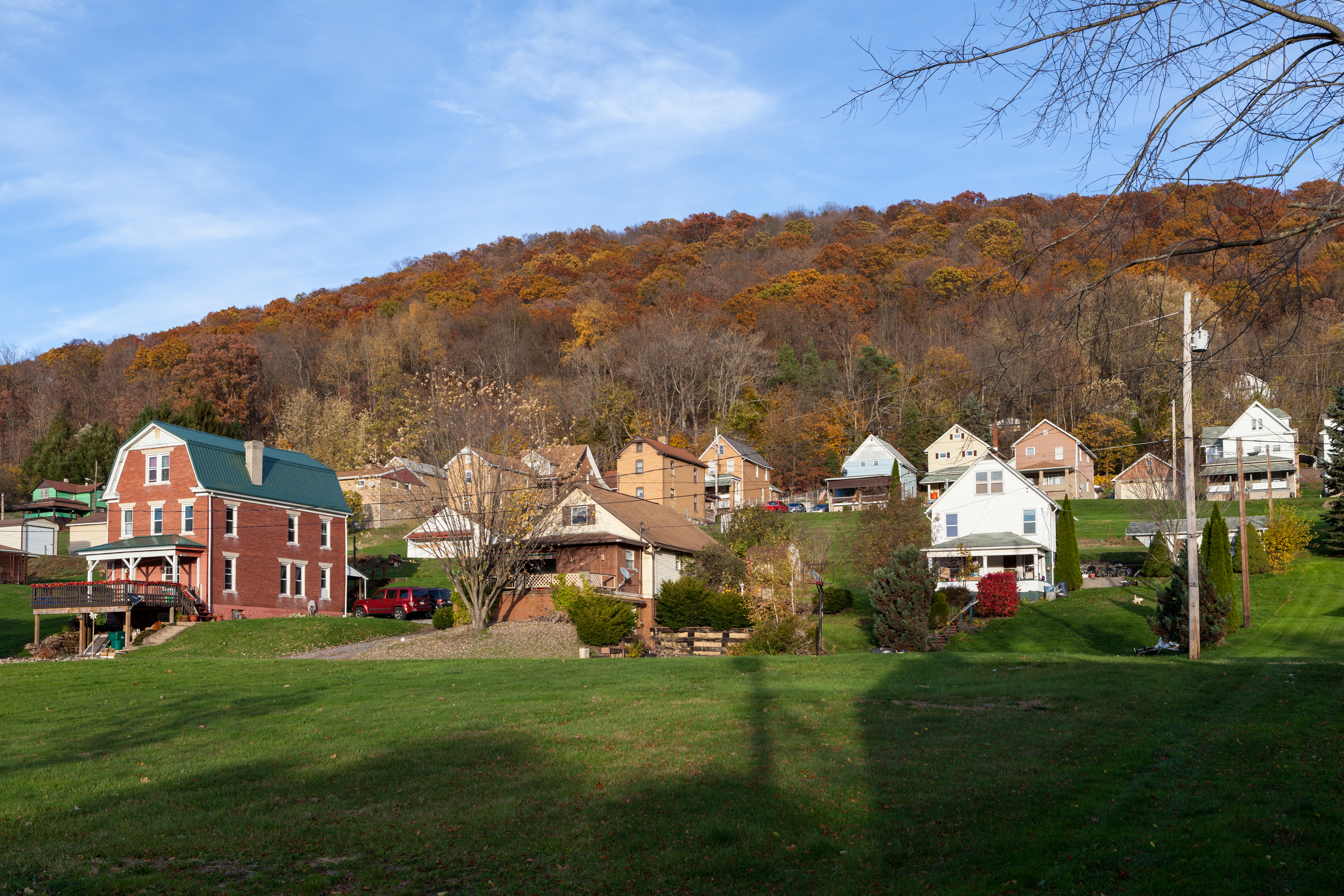
- Looking at the north portion of Templeton from the Allegheny River side of town

- Location within Pennsylvania Location within the United States
- Coordinates: 40°55′2″N 79°27′39″W
- Country: United States
- State: Pennsylvania
- County: Armstrong
- Township: Pine

Population (2020)
  - Total: 253
- Time zone: UTC-5 (Eastern (EST))
  - Summer (DST): UTC-4 (EDT)
- ZIP codes: 16259

Templeton is an unincorporated community and a census-designated place in Pine Township, Armstrong County, Pennsylvania, United States. As of the 2020 census the population was 253.

== History ==
Templeton Station appears in the 1876 Atlas of Armstrong County, Pennsylvania. It is also mentioned in the 1883 History of Armstrong County Pennsylvania.
