= Distant, Pennsylvania =

Unincorporated community in Pennsylvania, US

- Unincorporated community
- Location within Pennsylvania
- Coordinates: 40°58′10″N 79°21′24″W
- Country: United States
- State: Pennsylvania
- County: Armstrong
- Township: Mahoning
- Elevation: 1,401 ft (427 m)
- Time zone: UTC-5 (Eastern (EST))
  - Summer (DST): UTC-4 (EDT)
- ZIP code: 16223
- Area code: 814
- GNIS feature ID: 1173301

Distant is an unincorporated community in Armstrong County, Pennsylvania, United States. The community is located on state routes 28 and 66, 2.6 miles (4.2 km) south-southwest of New Bethlehem. Distant has a post office with ZIP code 16224.

== History ==
A post office called Oakland was established in 1841 and continued operation until 1907. The post office called Distant that remains was established in 1917. Oakland P.O. appears in the 1876 Atlas of Armstrong County, Pennsylvania. The founding of the town of Oakland, formerly Texas, is detailed in Chapter 15 of the 1883 History of Armstrong County Pennsylvania.

== Demographics ==
Historical population
Census	Pop.	Note	%±
2023 (est.)	611

The United States Census Bureau defined Distant as a census designated place in 2023.
