= Manorville, Pennsylvania =

Borough in Pennsylvania, US

- Borough
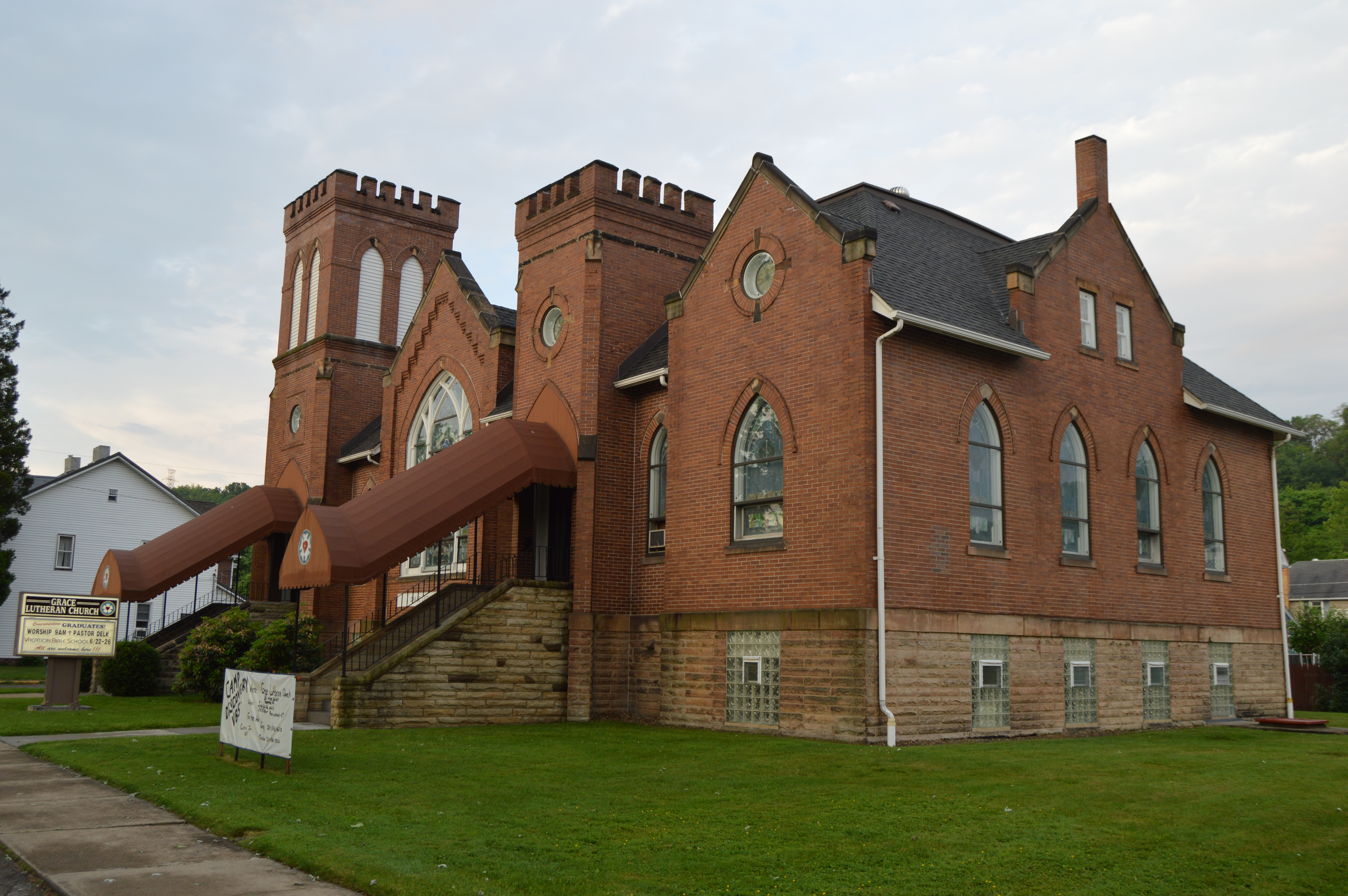
- Grace Lutheran Church

- Location of Manorville in Armstrong County, Pennsylvania.

- Location within Pennsylvania
- Coordinates: 40°47′11″N 79°31′18″W
- Country: United States
- State: Pennsylvania
- County: Armstrong

Government
  - Type: Borough Council

Area
  - Total: 0.12 sq mi (0.31 km^{2})
  - Land: 0.10 sq mi (0.26 km^{2})
  - Water: 0.019 sq mi (0.05 km^{2})
- Elevation: 800 ft (240 m)

Population (2020)
  - Total: 382
  - Density: 3,791.6/sq mi (1,463.95/km^{2})
- Time zone: UTC-5 (Eastern (EST))
  - Summer (DST): UTC-4 (EDT)
- Zip code: 16238
- Area code: 724
- FIPS code: 42-47064

Manorville is a borough in Armstrong County, Pennsylvania, United States. The population was 382 at the 2020 census.

== Geography ==
Manorville is located on the east bank of the Allegheny River at 40°47′11″N 79°31′18″W (40.786362, −79.521646), about 40 miles (64 km) northeast of Pittsburgh. It is bordered by the borough of Ford City to the south.

Water Street abuts the Allegheny River through most of Manorville. Although along the river, much of the borough is not in a flood zone. Many of the residents have dock access to the river, and one public boat ramp is available for trailering. Two churches are located within the borough (Grace Lutheran Church and Manorville Methodist Church). There is also a post office located towards the center of the town on Water Street.

According to the United States Census Bureau, Manorville has a total area of 0.12 square miles (0.3 km^{2}), of which 0.19 square miles (0.49 km^{2}), or 15.80%, is water.

== Demographics ==
Historical population
Census	Pop.	Note	%±
1870	330		—
1880	327		−0.9%
1890	392		19.9%
1900	453		15.6%
1910	545		20.3%
1920	537		−1.5%
1930	608		13.2%
1940	604		−0.7%
1950	662		9.6%
1960	557		−15.9%
1970	445		−20.1%
1980	409		−8.1%
1990	418		2.2%
2000	401		−4.1%
2010	410		2.2%
2020	382		−6.8%

As of the 2000 census, there were 401 people, 180 households, and 106 families residing in the borough. The population density was 4,058.8 inhabitants per square mile (1,567.1/km^{2}). There were 191 housing units at an average density of 1,933.2 per square mile (746.4/km^{2}). The racial makeup of the borough was 98.75% White, 0.25% Asian, and 1.00% from two or more races. Hispanic or Latino of any race were 0.50% of the population.

There were 180 households, out of which 26.1% had children under the age of 18 living with them, 49.4% were married couples living together, 6.7% had a female householder with no husband present, and 40.6% were non-families. 33.9% of all households were made up of individuals, and 15.6% had someone living alone who was 65 years of age or older. The average household size was 2.23 and the average family size was 2.93.

The median age of 39 years was slightly less than that of the county of 40 years. The distribution was 21.9% under the age of 18, 8.0% from 18 to 24, 31.4% from 25 to 44, 19.5% from 45 to 64, and 19.2% who were 65 years of age or older. The median age was 39 years. For every 100 females there were 96.6 males. For every 100 females age 18 and over, there were 89.7 males.

The median income for a household in the borough was $34,500, and the median income for a family was $36,250. Males had a median income of $27,109 versus $20,909 for females. The per capita income for the borough was $16,407. About 11.9% of families and 17.5% of the population were below the poverty line, including 31.2% of those under age 18 and 7.4% of those age 65 or over.
