= Boggs Township, Armstrong County, Pennsylvania =

Township in Pennsylvania, US

Coordinates: 40°53′09″N 79°25′00″W

- Township
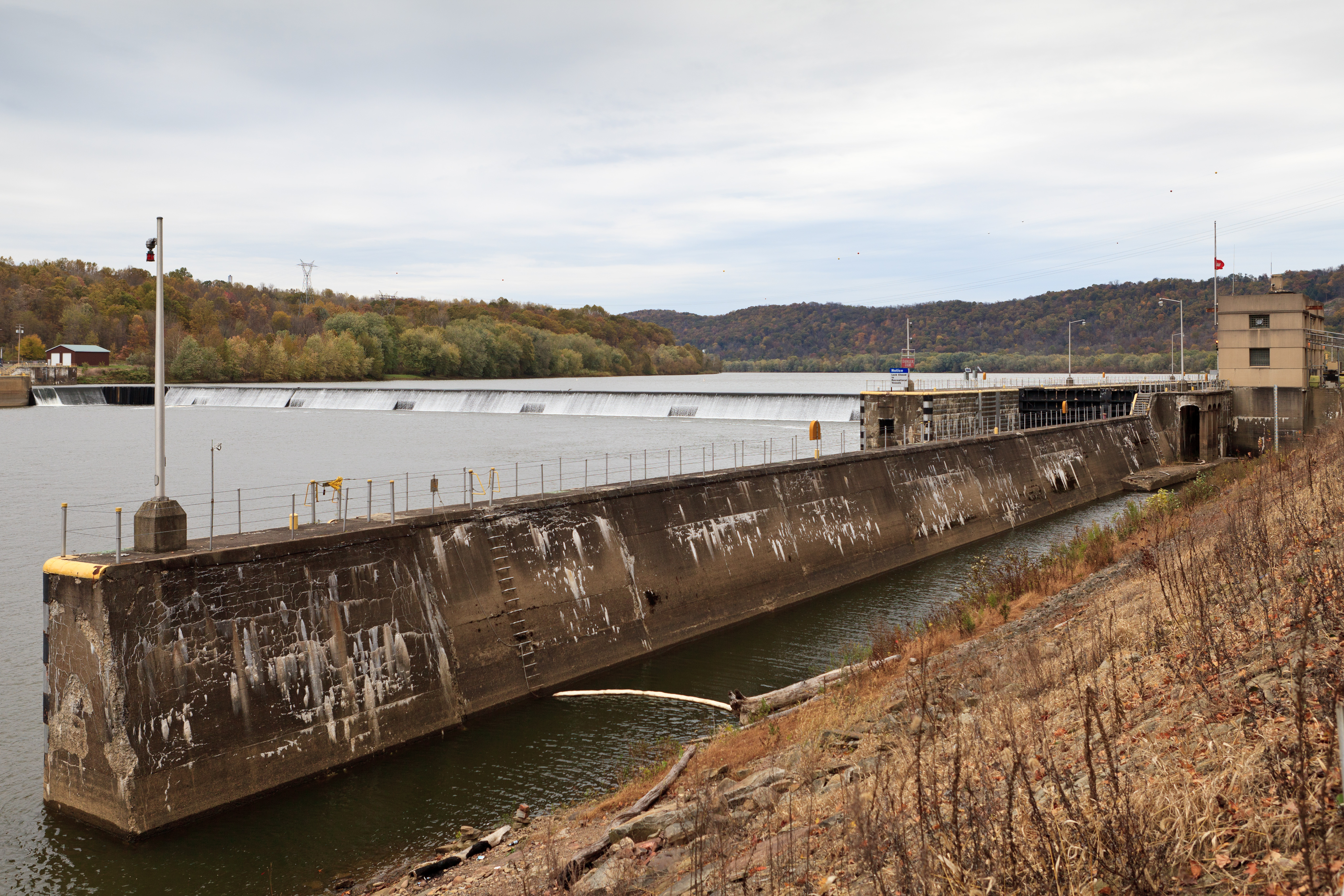
- The Allegheny River Lock and Dam No. 8

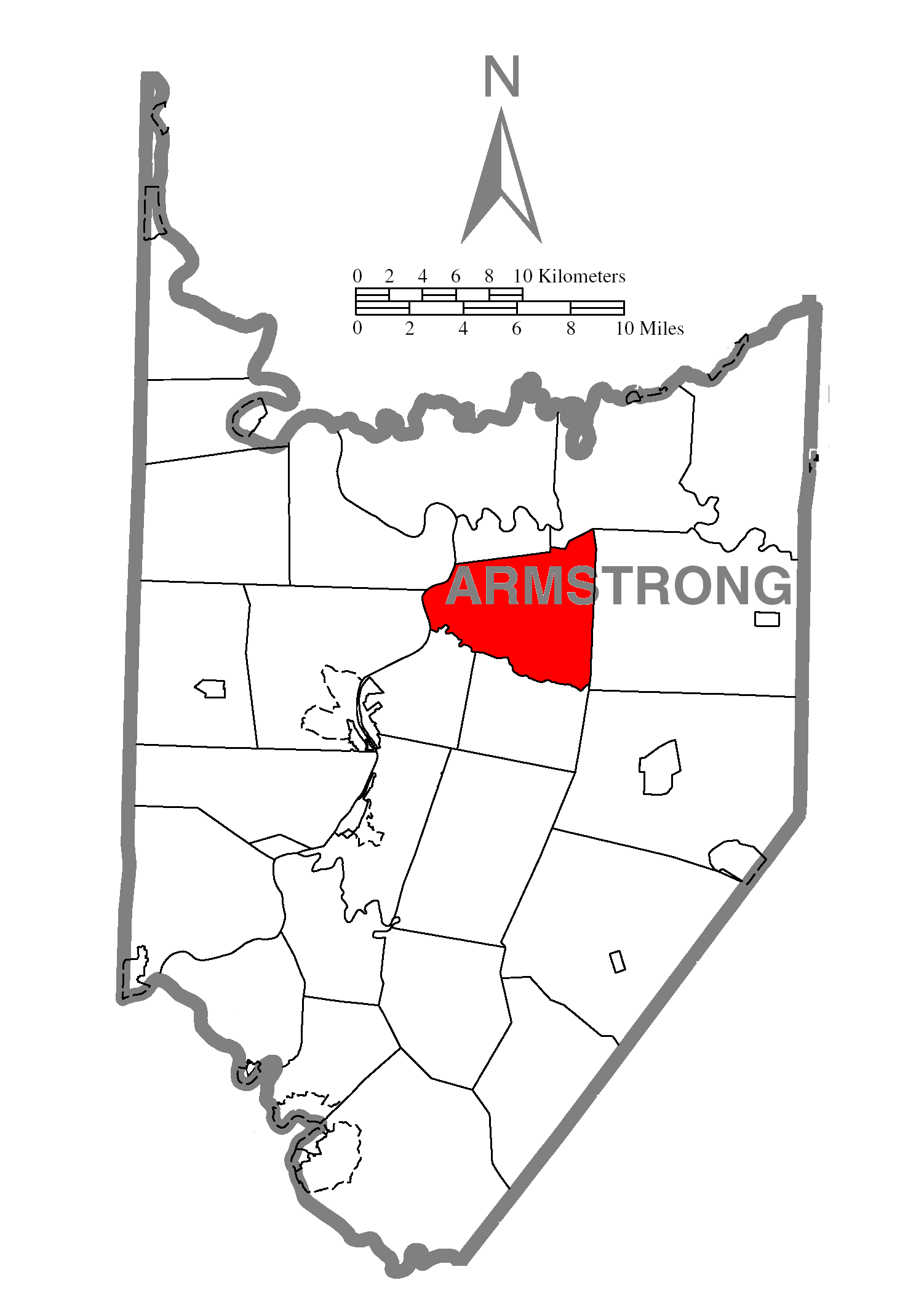
- Map of Armstrong County, Pennsylvania highlighting Boggs Township

- Map of Armstrong County, Pennsylvania
- Country: United States
- State: Pennsylvania
- County: Armstrong
- Settled: 1806
- Incorporated: 1878

Area
  - Total: 24.91 sq mi (64.51 km^{2})
  - Land: 24.58 sq mi (63.67 km^{2})
  - Water: 0.33 sq mi (0.85 km^{2})

Population (2020)
  - Total: 813
  - Estimate (2021): 805
  - Density: 38/sq mi (14.8/km^{2})
- Time zone: UTC-5 (Eastern (EST))
  - Summer (DST): UTC-4 (EDT)
- FIPS code: 42-005-07416

Boggs Township is a township in Armstrong County, Pennsylvania, United States. The population was 813 at the 2020 census, a decrease from the figure of 936 tabulated in 2010.

== History ==
The Allegheny River Lock and Dam No. 8 was listed on the National Register of Historic Places in 2000.

== Geography ==
According to the United States Census Bureau, the township has a total area of 24.9 square miles (64.5 km^{2}), of which 24.6 square miles (63.7 km^{2}) is land and 0.31 square miles (0.8 km^{2}), or 1.31%, is water.

== Recreation ==
Small portions of Pennsylvania State Game Lands Number 287 are located in the north of Boggs Township.

== Demographics ==
Historical population
Census	Pop.	Note	%±
2010	936		—
2020	813		−13.1%
2021 (est.)	805		−1.0%
U.S. Decennial Census

As of the 2000 census, there were 979 people, 348 households, and 290 families residing in the township. The population density was 40.6 inhabitants per square mile (15.7/km^{2}). There were 486 housing units at an average density of 20.2/sq mi (7.8/km^{2}). The racial makeup of the township was 98.16% White, 1.02% Native American, 0.61% from other races, and 0.20% from two or more races. Hispanic or Latino of any race were 0.61% of the population.

There were 348 households, out of which 37.4% had children under the age of 18 living with them, 70.4% were married couples living together, 6.9% had a female householder with no husband present, and 16.4% were non-families. 15.2% of all households were made up of individuals, and 8.9% had someone living alone who was 65 years of age or older. The average household size was 2.79 and the average family size was 3.08.

The median age of 38 years was less than that of the county of 40 years. The distribution was 26.5% under the age of 18, 8.2% from 18 to 24, 28.1% from 25 to 44, 23.9% from 45 to 64, and 13.4% who were 65 years of age or older. The median age was 38 years. For every 100 females there were 96.6 males. For every 100 females age 18 and over, there were 96.7 males.

The median income for a household in the township was $33,571, and the median income for a family was $36,136. Males had a median income of $30,089 versus $20,268 for females. The per capita income for the township was $14,432. About 8.1% of families and 8.1% of the population were below the poverty line, including 9.7% of those under age 18 and 10.2% of those age 65 or over.

== Cemeteries ==
- Calhoun Cemetery
- Cochran Cemetery
- Lower Piney Cemetery
- Mateer Cemetery
- Mount Zion Cemetery
- Rehobeth Reformed Presbyterian Church Cemetery
