= National Register of Historic Places listings in Armstrong County, Pennsylvania =

Location of Armstrong County in Pennsylvania

This is a list of the National Register of Historic Places listings in Armstrong County, Pennsylvania.

This is intended to be a complete list of the properties and districts on the National Register of Historic Places in Armstrong County, Pennsylvania, United States. The locations of National Register properties and districts for which the latitude and longitude coordinates are included below, may be seen in a map.

There are 15 properties and districts listed on the National Register in the county.

This National Park Service list is complete through NPS recent listings posted May 1, 2026.

== Current listings ==
	Name on the Register	Image	Date listed	Location	City or town	Description
1	Allegheny River Lock and Dam No. 5	Allegheny River Lock and Dam No. 5	April 21, 2000 (#00000399)	830 River Road above Freeport; 40°41′09″N 79°39′59″W	Gilpin and South Buffalo Townships	
2	Allegheny River Lock and Dam No. 6	Allegheny River Lock and Dam No. 6	April 21, 2000 (#00000400)	1258 River Road above Freeport; 40°43′05″N 79°34′46″W	Bethel and South Buffalo Townships	
3	Allegheny River Lock and Dam No. 7	Allegheny River Lock and Dam No. 7	April 21, 2000 (#00000401)	Along Pennsylvania Route 4023, 0.6 miles (0.97 km) north of Kittanning Bridge; 40°49′16″N 79°31′44″W	East Franklin Township and Kittanning	
4	Allegheny River Lock and Dam No. 8	Allegheny River Lock and Dam No. 8	April 21, 2000 (#00000402)	Along Pennsylvania Route 1033, 1.5 miles (2.4 km) south of Templeton; 40°53′48″N 79°28′48″W	Boggs and Washington Townships	
5	Allegheny River Lock and Dam No. 9	Allegheny River Lock and Dam No. 9	April 21, 2000 (#00000403)	Terminus of Pennsylvania Route 1004, 0.2 miles (0.32 km) north of Township Route 488; 40°57′17″N 79°32′50″W	Madison and Washington Townships	
6	Armstrong County Courthouse and Jail	Armstrong County Courthouse and Jail	November 1, 1981 (#81000526)	East Market Street; 40°48′59″N 79°31′00″W	Kittanning	
7	Bradys Bend Iron Company Furnaces	Bradys Bend Iron Company Furnaces	August 11, 1980 (#80003407)	Pennsylvania Route 68 in Bradys Bend; 40°59′55″N 79°37′34″W	Bradys Bend Township	
8	Bridge between Madison and Mahoning Townships	Bridge between Madison and Mahoning Townships	June 22, 1988 (#88000798)	Legislative Route 03178 over Mahoning Creek near Deanville; 40°55′52″N 79°23′18″W	Madison and Mahoning Townships	
9	Colwell Cut Viaduct	Colwell Cut Viaduct	June 22, 1988 (#88000796)	Legislative Route 66 over the Pittsburg and Shawmut Railroad southwest of Seminole; 40°56′13″N 79°21′47″W	Mahoning Township	
10	Drake Log Cabin	Drake Log Cabin	March 3, 1983 (#83002214)	Williams Alley; 40°34′45″N 79°33′55″W	Apollo	
11	Ford City Armory	Ford City Armory	December 22, 1989 (#89002074)	301 Tenth Street; 40°46′18″N 79°31′55″W	Ford City	
12	Kittanning Passenger Station and Freight Depot		January 3, 2025 (#100011233)	N. Grant Avenue and Reynolds Avenue; 40°49′06″N 79°31′12″W	Kittanning	
13	Thomas Marshall House	Thomas Marshall House	April 22, 1976 (#76001602)	State Street; 40°52′50″N 79°14′34″W	Dayton	
14	St. Patrick's Roman Catholic Church	St. Patrick's Roman Catholic Church	March 21, 1978 (#78002340)	West of Cowansville off Pennsylvania Route 268; 40°53′45″N 79°40′37″W	Sugarcreek Township	
15	St. Stephen's Church	St. Stephen's Church	June 30, 1980 (#80003408)	Pennsylvania Route 68 in Bradys Bend; 40°59′40″N 79°37′51″W	Bradys Bend Township	

== See also ==
- List of Pennsylvania state historical markers in Armstrong County
