= Pennsylvania House of Representatives, District 63 =

American legislative district

Pennsylvania's 63rd State House of Representatives district
Representative
Josh Bashline; R–Clarion Township
- Population (2022): 65,048

The 63rd Pennsylvania House of Representatives District is in Western Pennsylvania and has been represented by Josh Bashline since 2025.

== District Profile ==
The 63rd District encompasses parts of Armstrong County and all of Clarion County and includes the following areas:

Armstrong County

- Atwood
- Bradys Bend Township
- Boggs Township
- Cowanshannock Township
- Dayton
- Elderton
- Hovey Township
- Kittanning
- Kittanning
- Madison Township
- Mahoning Township
- Parker
- Perry Township
- Pine Township
- Plumcreek Township
- Rayburn Township
- Redbank Township
- Rural Valley
- South Bethlehem
- Sugarcreek Township
- Valley Township
- Washington Township
- Wayne Township
- West Franklin Township
- Worthington

Clarion County

== Representatives ==
Representative	Party	Years	District home	Note
Prior to 1969, seats were apportioned by county.
George W. Alexander	Republican	1969 – 1972		
Chester H. Byerly	Republican	1973 – 1974		
James L. Cumberland	Republican	1975 – 1976		
David R. Wright	Democrat	1977 – 1996		
Fred McIlhattan	Republican	1997 – 2008	Knox	
Donna Oberlander	Republican	2009 – 2024		
Josh Bashline	Republican	2025 – present	Clarion Township	Incumbent

== Recent election results ==
PA House election, 2024: Pennsylvania House, District 63
Party	Candidate	Votes	%
Republican	Josh Bashline	27,017	80.03
Democratic	Pat Ritchie	6,742	19.97
Total votes		33,759	100.00
Republican hold			

PA House election, 2022: Pennsylvania House, District 63
Party	Candidate	Votes	%
Republican	Donna Oberlander (incumbent)	Unopposed	
Total votes		23,702	100.00
Republican hold			

PA House election, 2020: Pennsylvania House, District 63
Party	Candidate	Votes	%
Republican	Donna Oberlander (incumbent)	Unopposed	
Total votes		26,480	100.00
Republican hold			

PA House election, 2018: Pennsylvania House, District 63
Party	Candidate	Votes	%
Republican	Donna Oberlander (incumbent)	15,163	73.08
Democratic	Conrad Warner	5,585	26.92
Total votes		20,748	100.00
Republican hold			

PA House election, 2016: Pennsylvania House, District 63
Party	Candidate	Votes	%
Republican	Donna Oberlander (incumbent)	19,533	75.64
Democratic	Joseph Billotte	6,289	24.36
Total votes		25,822	100.00
Republican hold			
