= List of Pennsylvania state historical markers in Armstrong County =

Location of Armstrong County in Pennsylvania

This is a list of the Pennsylvania state historical markers in Armstrong County.

This is intended to be a complete list of the official state historical markers placed in Armstrong County, Pennsylvania by the Pennsylvania Historical and Museum Commission (PHMC). The locations of the historical markers, as well as the latitude and longitude coordinates as provided by the PHMC's database, are included below when available. There are 11 historical markers located in Armstrong County.

== Historical markers ==
Marker title	Image	Date dedicated	Location	Marker type	Topics
Armstrong County		October 15, 1982	Courthouse, north end Market Street, Kittanning; 40.81598°N 79.5164°W	City	French & Indian War, Government & Politics, Government & Politics 19th Century, Invention, Military, Native American
Blanket Hill		November 28, 1946	US 422, 6.5 miles southeast of Kittanning; 40.76488°N 79.41666°W	Roadside	French & Indian War, Military, Native American
Brady's Bend Works		November 28, 1946	PA 68 Brady's Bend, at Allegheny River Bridge; 40.999167°N 79.625472°W	Roadside	Business & Industry, Iron, Transportation
Fort Armstrong		November 28, 1946	PA 66, 1.8 miles south of Kittanning (MISSING)	Roadside	American Revolution, Forts, Military
General John Armstrong - PLAQUE		May 11, 1917	Mounted on Armstrong County Courthouse at entrance, north end of Market Street, Kittanning; 40.81612°N 79.5165°W	Plaque	American Revolution, Ethnic & Immigration, Military
Kittanning		November 28, 1946	Butler Road (Bus. Route 422) & Allegheny Avenue, at bridge, Applewold; 40.8116°N 79.52406°W	Roadside	Early Settlement, French & Indian War, Military, Native American
Kittanning		November 28, 1946	At Highway garage on US 422 (South Water Street), Kittanning; 40.8084°N 79.51573°W	Roadside	Early Settlement, Native American
Kittanning or Attique Indian Town - PLAQUE		September 1, 1926	At park on east bank of Allegheny River, adjacent to bridge, North Water & Market Streets, Kittanning; 40.81358°N 79.52127°W	Plaque	Early Settlement, Native American
Nellie Bly		July 22, 1995	500 Terrace Avenue, Apollo; 40.585767°N 79.563700°W	City	Professions & Vocations, Publishing, Women
Pittsburgh Plate Glass Ford City Works		November 12, 2003	Third Avenue at Ninth Street, Ford City; 40.77055°N 79.533°W	City	Business & Industry, Ethnic & Immigration, Glass, Labor
St. Patrick's Church		July 16, 1946	East Brady Road (PA 268), ~4 miles northwest of Cowansville; 40.95155°N 79.65895°W	Roadside	Buildings, Religion

== See also ==
- List of Pennsylvania state historical markers
- National Register of Historic Places listings in Armstrong County, Pennsylvania
