= Donna Oberlander =

American politician

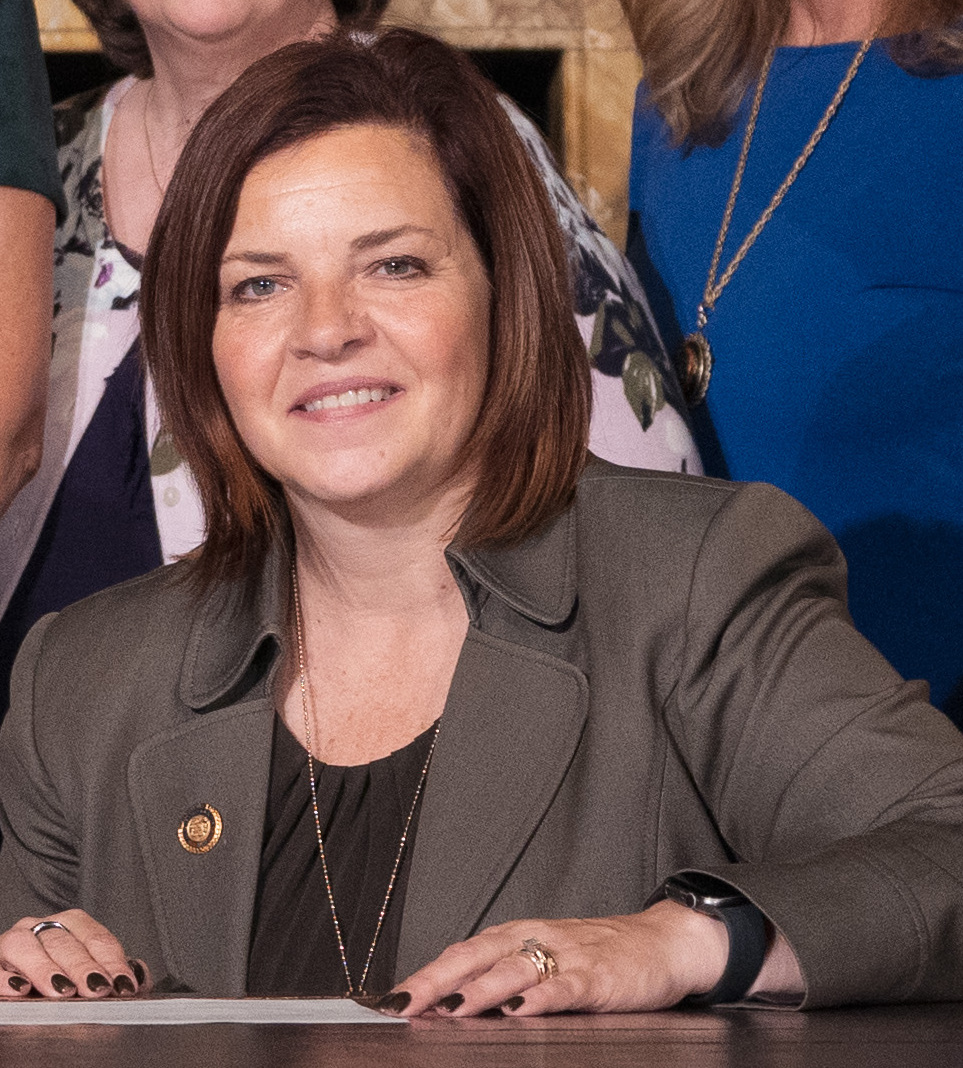
- Oberlander in 2022

Member of the Pennsylvania House of Representatives from the 63rd district
- In office January 6, 2009 – November 30, 2024
- Preceded by: Fred McIlhattan
- Succeeded by: Josh Bashline

Republican Whip of the Pennsylvania House of Representatives
- In office June 22, 2020 – November 30, 2022
- Leader: Kerry Benninghoff
- Preceded by: Kerry Benninghoff
- Succeeded by: Tim O'Neal

Personal details
- Born: April 15, 1970 (age 56)
- Party: Republican
- Spouse: Derek Oberlander
- Website: http://repoberlander.com

Donna Oberlander is an American politician. A member of the Republican Party, she was elected to her first term in the Pennsylvania House of Representatives in November 2008. She served as the majority whip, and was appointed to the Rules Committee and the Committee on Committees.

== Career ==
Before she was elected to the House, Oberlander served as legislative aide to former State Representative Fred McIlhattan. She left that office to help local businesses grow and expand in Clarion County before being elected to the Clarion County Board of Commissioners in 2004.

=== Committee assignments ===
- Committee On Committees
- Rules

== Personal ==
Oberlander graduated from Clarion University with a bachelor's degree in political science. Upon graduation, she married her high school sweetheart, a United States Marine stationed in Quantico, Virginia. While in Quantico, Oberlander worked for a government contractor tracking radio communications for Navy ships. She has two children.
