= David R. Wright =

American politician

Member of the Pennsylvania House of Representatives from the 63rd district
- In office 1977–1996
- Preceded by: James Cumberland
- Succeeded by: Fred McIlhattan

Personal details
- Born: December 24, 1935 Springfield, Missouri
- Died: November 18, 2016 (aged 80) Clarion, Pennsylvania
- Party: Democratic

David R. Wright (December 24, 1935 – November 18, 2016) was a Democratic member of the Pennsylvania House of Representatives.
