= Josh Bashline =

American politician from Pennsylvania

Member of the Pennsylvania House of Representatives from the 63rd district
- Incumbent
- Assumed office December 1, 2024
- Preceded by: Donna Oberlander

Personal details
- Party: Republican
- Education: Edinboro University
- Website: repbashline.com

Josh Bashline is an American politician that represents the 63rd district of the Pennsylvania House of Representatives as a Republican since 2024. He previously served in the United States Army.

For the 2025-2026 Session, Bashline sits on the following committees:

- Environmental & Natural Resource Protection
- Housing & Community Development
- Human Services
- Veterans Affairs & Emergency Preparedness
