= James Cumberland =

American politician (1933–2023)

James L. Cumberland

Member of the Pennsylvania House of Representatives from the 63rd district
- In office 1975–1976
- Preceded by: Chester Byerly
- Succeeded by: David R. Wright

Personal details
- Born: October 26, 1933 Butler, Pennsylvania, U.S.
- Died: November 18, 2023 (aged 90)
- Party: Republican

James L. Cumberland (October 26, 1933 – November 18, 2023) was an American politician who was a Republican member of the Pennsylvania House of Representatives. He was born in Butler. As Sheriff of Clarion County, Pennsylvania, he spearheaded the first county wide 911 system in the Nation on April 13, 1973. Cumberland died at his home on November 18, 2023, at the age of 90.
