= George W. Alexander =

American politician (1904–1992)

Member of the Pennsylvania House of Representatives from the 63rd district
- In office 1969–1972
- Preceded by: District created
- Succeeded by: Chester Byerly

Member of the Pennsylvania House of Representatives from the Clarion County district
- In office 1963–1968

Personal details
- Born: October 28, 1904 Clarion, Pennsylvania, U.S.
- Died: May 16, 1992 (aged 87)
- Party: Republican

George W. Alexander (October 28, 1904 – May 16, 1992) was a Republican member of the Pennsylvania House of Representatives.
