= Fred McIlhattan =

American politician (1944–2020)

Member of the Pennsylvania House of Representatives from the 63rd district
- In office January 7, 1997 – November 30, 2008
- Preceded by: David R. Wright
- Succeeded by: Donna Oberlander

Personal details
- Born: September 22, 1944 Butler, Pennsylvania, US
- Died: June 10, 2020 (aged 75) Knox, Pennsylvania, US
- Party: Republican
- Spouse: Teresa McIlhattan
- Children: 2
- Education: Clarion University
- Website: www.fredmcilhattan.com

Fred McIlhattan (September 22, 1944 – June 10, 2020) was a Republican former member of the Pennsylvania House of Representatives, representing the 63rd District from 1997 through 2008. He and his wife live in Knox, Pennsylvania and have 2 children. He retired prior to the 2008 election and was succeeded by Republican Donna Oberlander. McIlhattan died in 2020 after a heart attack at the age of 75.
