= Thomas Marshall House (Dayton, Pennsylvania) =

Historic house in Pennsylvania, United States

- U.S. National Register of Historic Places
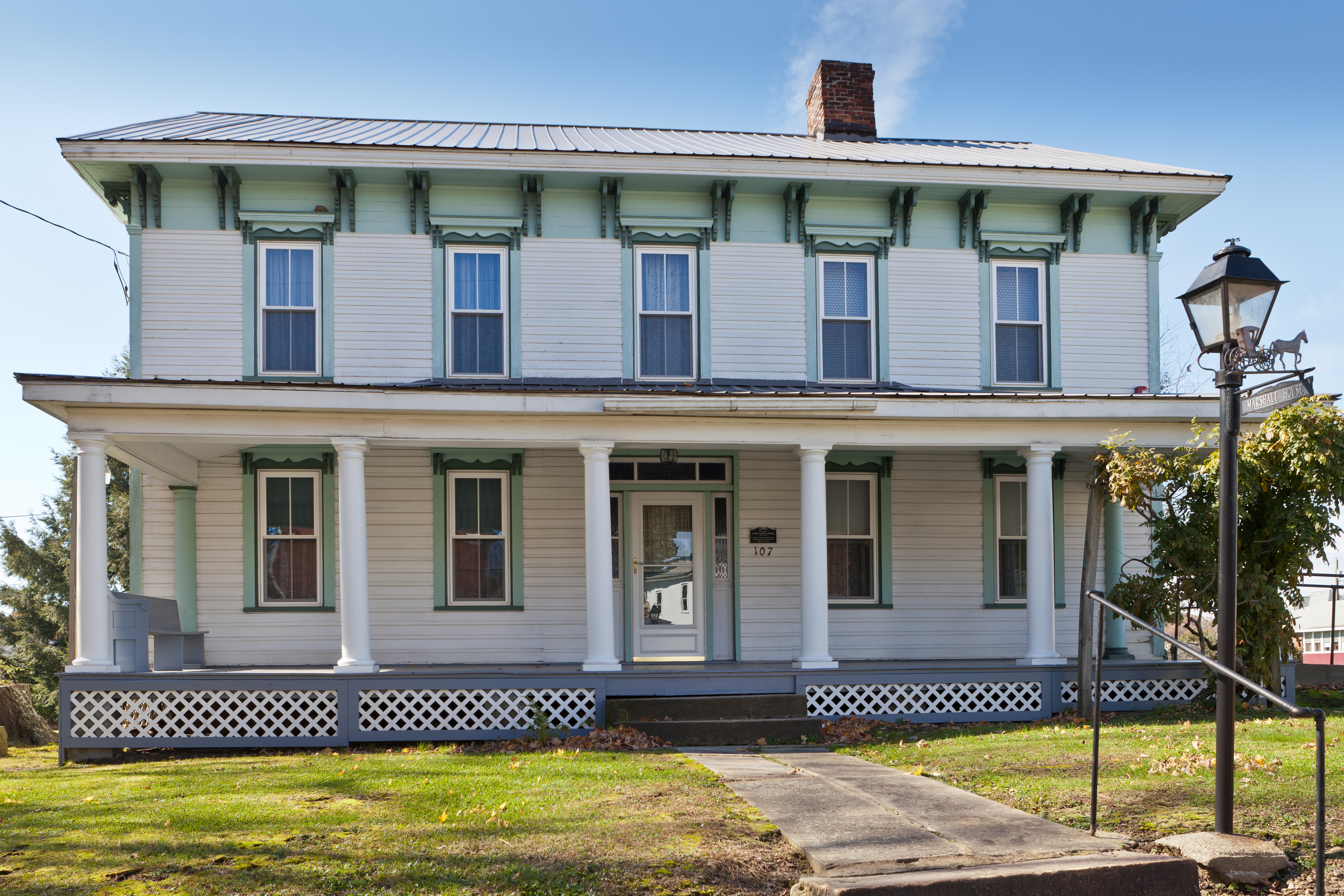

- Location within Pennsylvania
- Location: State Street, Dayton, Pennsylvania
- Coordinates: 40°52′50″N 79°14′32″W
- Built: around 1865-1868
- Architectural style: Georgian plan, vernacular Victorian with Greek Revival influence
- NRHP reference No.: 76001602
- Added to NRHP: April 22, 1976

The Thomas Marshall House is a historic house in Dayton, Armstrong County, Pennsylvania. It was listed on the National Register of Historic Places on April 22, 1976.

== History ==
The house was built around 1865–1868 with a Georgian plan. The architecture mixes general Victorian themes with elements of the earlier Greek Revival in a vernacular manner. An addition was added to the house in 1881.

As of 2013, it is home to the Dayton Area Local History Society, and is open for tours by appointment. It was restored by the Dayton Area Bicentennial Committee, which opened it in July 1976.

== See also ==
- National Register of Historic Places listings in Armstrong County, Pennsylvania
