= Chester Byerly =

American politician

Chester H. Byerly

Member of the Pennsylvania House of Representatives from the 63rd district
- In office 1973–1974
- Preceded by: George W. Alexander
- Succeeded by: James Cumberland

Personal details
- Born: March 5, 1918 Farmington Township, Clarion County, Pennsylvania
- Died: September 20, 1984 (aged 66) Shadyside, Pittsburgh, Pennsylvania
- Party: Republican

Chester H. Byerly (March 5, 1918 – September 20, 1984) was a former Republican member of the Pennsylvania House of Representatives.

He died of a heart attack in 1984.
