= Colwell Cut Viaduct =

- U.S. National Register of Historic Places
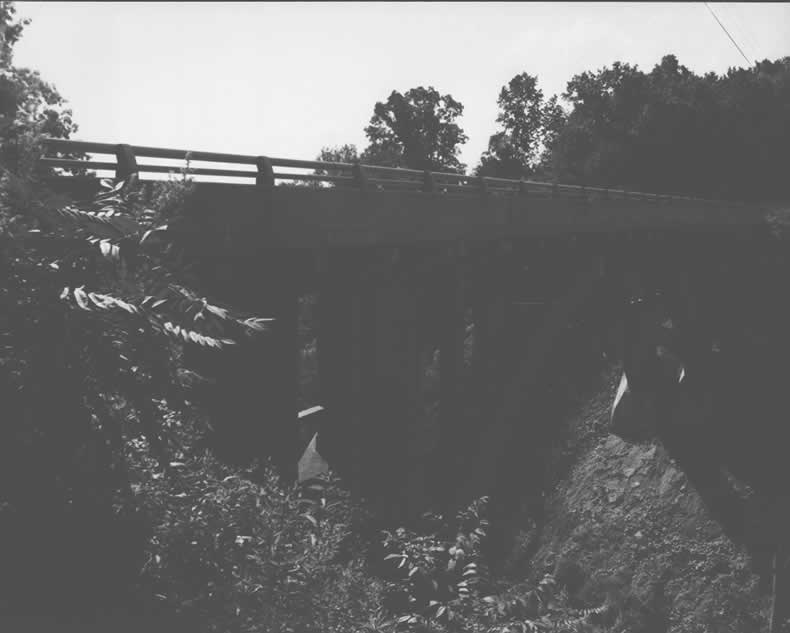
- Colwell Cut Viaduct, 1982

- Location within Pennsylvania Location within the United States
- Location: Legislative Route 66 over the Pittsburg and Shawmut Railroad southwest of Seminole, Mahoning Township, Pennsylvania
- Coordinates: 40°56′13″N 79°21′47″W
- Area: less than one acre
- Built: 1922
- Built by: Concrete Steel Bridge Co.
- Architectural style: Open-spandrel arch
- MPS: Highway Bridges Owned by the Commonwealth of Pennsylvania, Department of Transportation TR
- NRHP reference No.: 88000796
- Added to NRHP: June 22, 1988

Colwell Cut Viaduct, also known as Hogback Hill Bridge, is a historic concrete arch bridge located at Mahoning Township in Armstrong County, Pennsylvania. It was built in 1922, and is a 220-foot-long (67 m) three-span bridge, with a 128-foot-long (39 m) main span. It crosses the Pittsburg and Shawmut Railroad.

It was listed on the National Register of Historic Places in 1988.
