= East Franklin Township, Armstrong County, Pennsylvania =

Township in Pennsylvania, US

Coordinates: 40°53′00″N 79°29′29″W

East Franklin Township, Pennsylvania
- Township
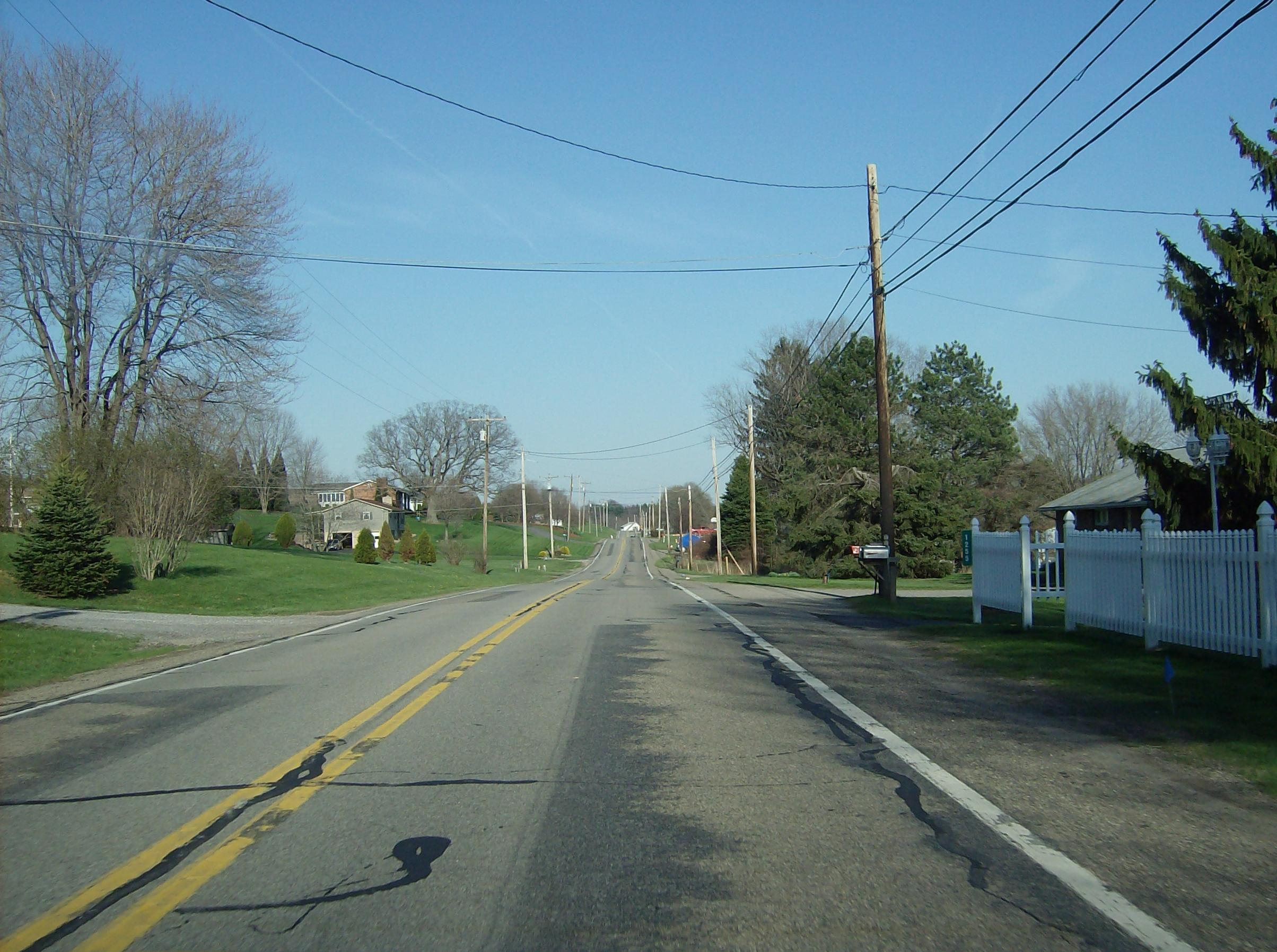
- Along Butler Road in the western part of the township

- Flag Seal

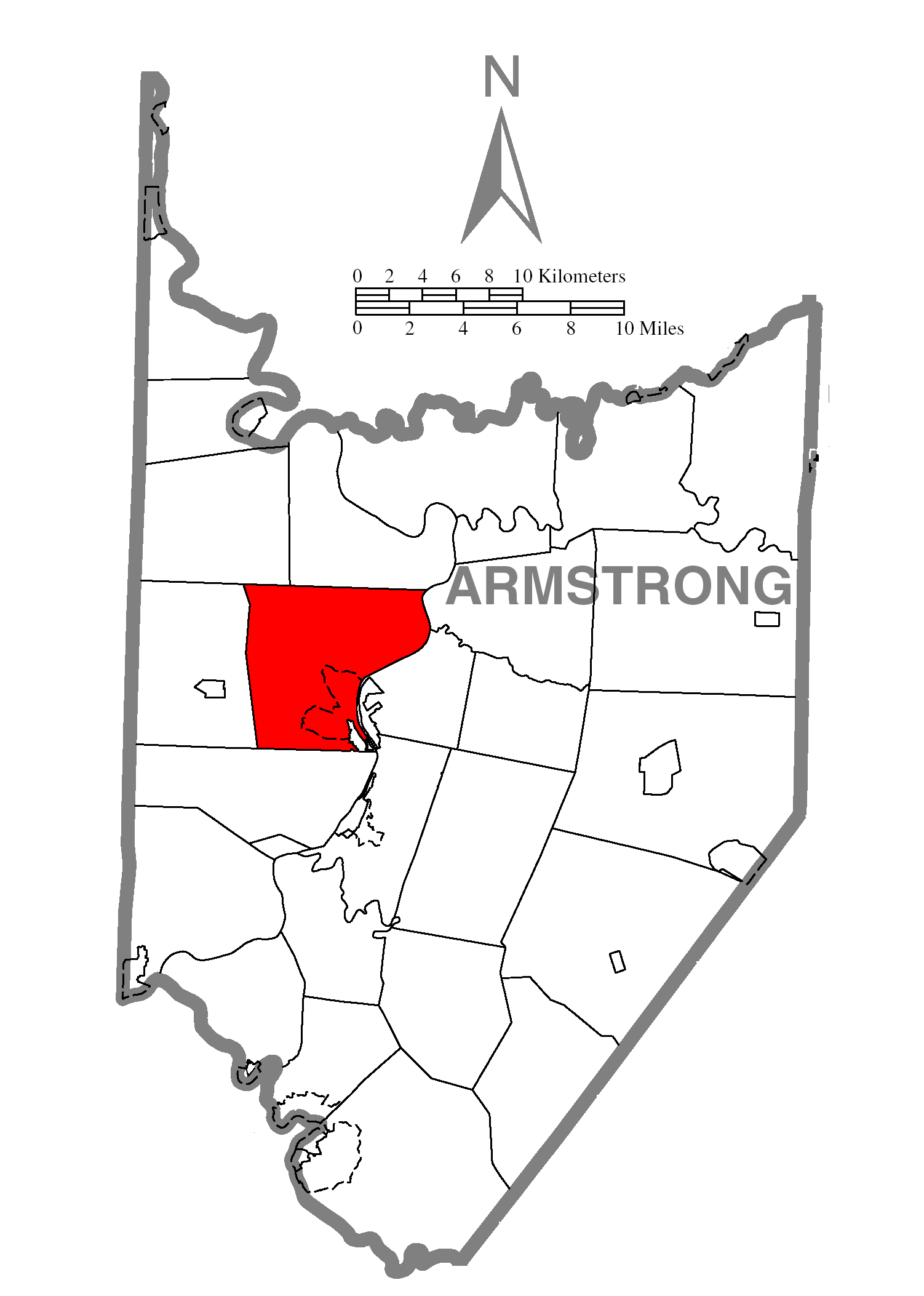
- Map of Armstrong County, Pennsylvania, highlighting East Franklin Township

- Map of Armstrong County, Pennsylvania
- Country: United States
- State: Pennsylvania
- County: Armstrong
- Settled: 1830
- Incorporated: 1868

Area
  - Total: 31.55 sq mi (81.72 km^{2})
  - Land: 30.88 sq mi (79.99 km^{2})
  - Water: 0.67 sq mi (1.73 km^{2})

Population (2020)
  - Total: 3,821
  - Estimate (2021): 3,808
  - Density: 127.5/sq mi (49.24/km^{2})
- Time zone: UTC-5 (Eastern (EST))
  - Summer (DST): UTC-4 (EDT)
- ZIP code: 16201
- Area code: 724
- FIPS code: 42-005-21160
- Website: www.eastfranklintownship.com

East Franklin Township is a township in Armstrong County, Pennsylvania, United States. The population was 3,821 at the 2020 census, a decrease from the figure of 4,082 tabulated in 2010.

== History ==
The Allegheny River Lock and Dam No. 7 was listed on the National Register of Historic Places in 2000. East Franklin Township appears in the 1876 Atlas of Armstrong County, Pennsylvania.

== Geography ==
The township is located in west-central Armstrong County, on the west side of the Allegheny River. It surrounds the boroughs of West Kittanning and Applewold. Unincorporated communities in the township include West Hills, Walkchalk, Furnace Run, Tarrtown, Bridgeburg, Adrian, and Cowansville.

According to the United States Census Bureau, the township has a total area of 31.5 square miles (81.7 km^{2}), of which 30.9 square miles (80.0 km^{2}) is land and 0.66 square miles (1.7 km^{2}), or 2.12%, is water.

== Demographics ==
Historical population
Census	Pop.	Note	%±
2010	4,082		—
2020	3,821		−6.4%
2021 (est.)	3,808		−0.3%
U.S. Decennial Census

As of the 2000 census, there were 3,900 people, 1,546 households, and 1,167 families residing in the township. The population density was 126.4 inhabitants per square mile (48.8/km^{2}). There were 1,656 housing units at an average density of 53.7 per square mile (20.7/km^{2}). The racial makeup of the township was 98.87% White, 0.10% African American, 0.21% Native American, 0.36% Asian, 0.03% Pacific Islander, 0.03% from other races, and 0.41% from two or more races. Hispanic or Latino of any race were 0.44% of the population.

There were 1,546 households, out of which 28.9% had children under the age of 18 living with them, 66.9% were married couples living together, 5.2% had a female householder with no husband present, and 24.5% were non-families. 21.6% of all households were made up of individuals, and 12.2% had someone living alone who was 65 years of age or older. The average household size was 2.51 and the average family size was 2.93.

The township median age of 43 years was significantly more than the county median age of 40 years. The distribution by age group was 21.9% under the age of 18, 6.1% from 18 to 24, 25.5% from 25 to 44, 28.7% from 45 to 64, and 17.8% who were 65 years of age or older. The median age was 43 years. For every 100 females, there were 93.4 males. For every 100 females age 18 and over, there were 92.0 males.

The median income for a household in the township was $37,753, and the median income for a family was $41,797. Males had a median income of $35,391 versus $20,000 for females. The per capita income for the township was $17,787. About 7.2% of families and 8.2% of the population were below the poverty line, including 14.3% of those under age 18 and 4.8% of those age 65 or over.

== Cemeteries ==
- Cowansville Cemetery
- Crissman Family Cemetery
- Croyle Cemetery
- Lawnhaven Cemetery / Lawn Haven Burial Estates
- Montgomeryville Baptist Church Cemetery
- Myers - Patton Cemetery
- Rich Hill United Presbyterian Church Cemetery
- West Glade Run Presbyterian Cemetery
