= Allegheny River Lock and Dam No. 9 =

- U.S. National Register of Historic Places
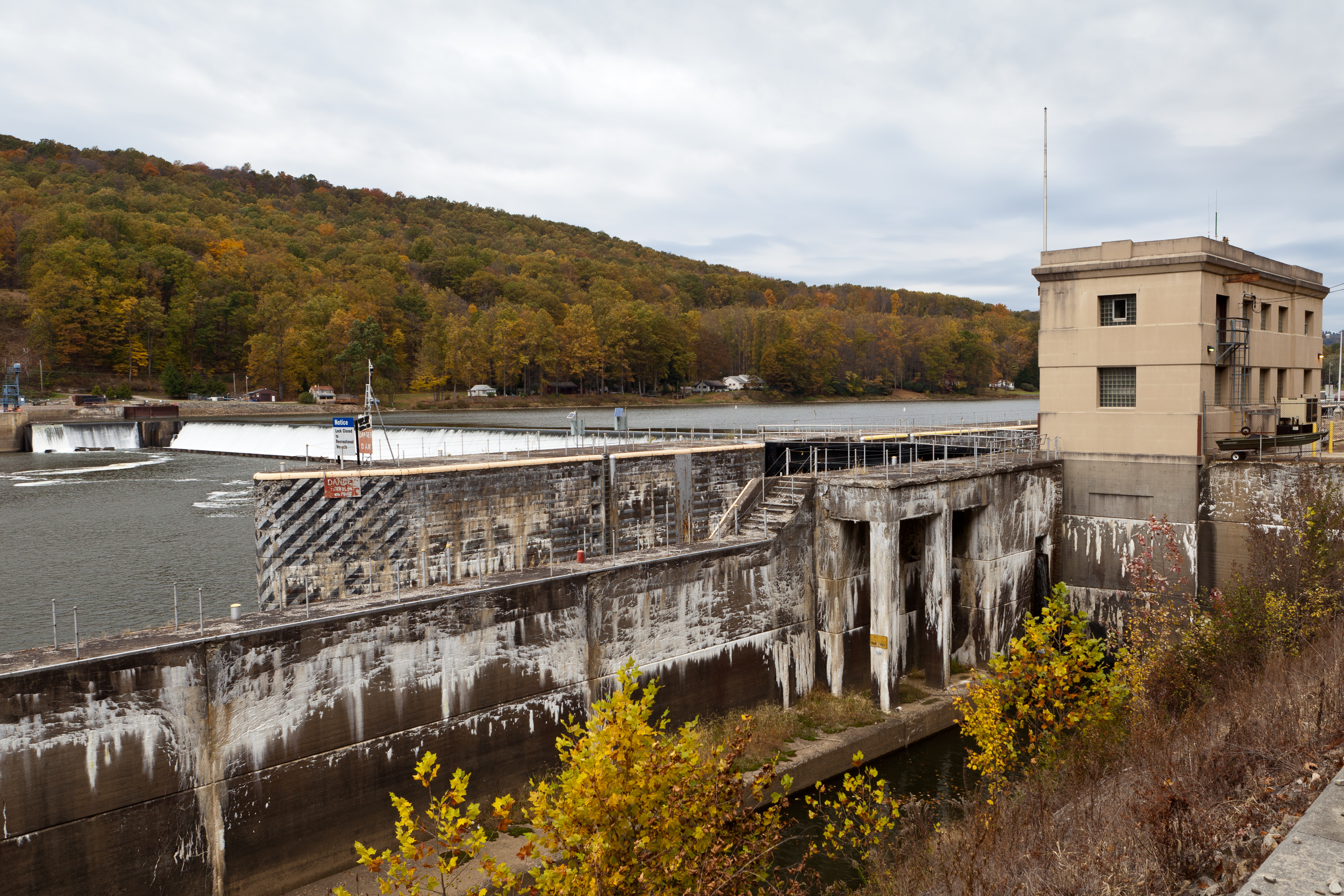

- Location within Pennsylvania Location within the United States
- Location: Terminus of PA 1004, 0.2 mi. N of T488, Madison Township, Pennsylvania and Washington Township, Pennsylvania
- Coordinates: 40°57′17″N 79°32′50″W
- Area: 59.5 acres (24.1 ha)
- Built: 1935-1938
- Built by: York Engineering & Construction
- Architectural style: Late 19th And 20th Century Revivals
- MPS: Allegheny River Navigation System MPS
- NRHP reference No.: 00000403
- Added to NRHP: April 21, 2000

Allegheny River Lock and Dam No. 9 is a historic lock and fixed-crest dam complex located at Madison Township and Washington Township in Armstrong County, Pennsylvania. It was built between 1935 and 1938 by the United States Army Corps of Engineers, and includes the lock, dam, steel miter gates, and Operations Building. The lock measures 56 feet by 360 feet, and has a lift of 22 feet. The dam measures approximately 60 feet high and 918 feet long. The Operations Building, or powerhouse, is a utilitarian two-story building in a vernacular early-20th century revival style. The lock and dam were built by the U.S. Army Corps of Engineers as a part of an extensive system of locks and dams to improve navigation along the Allegheny River.

It was listed on the National Register of Historic Places in 2000.
