= Allegheny River Lock and Dam No. 7 =

- U.S. National Register of Historic Places
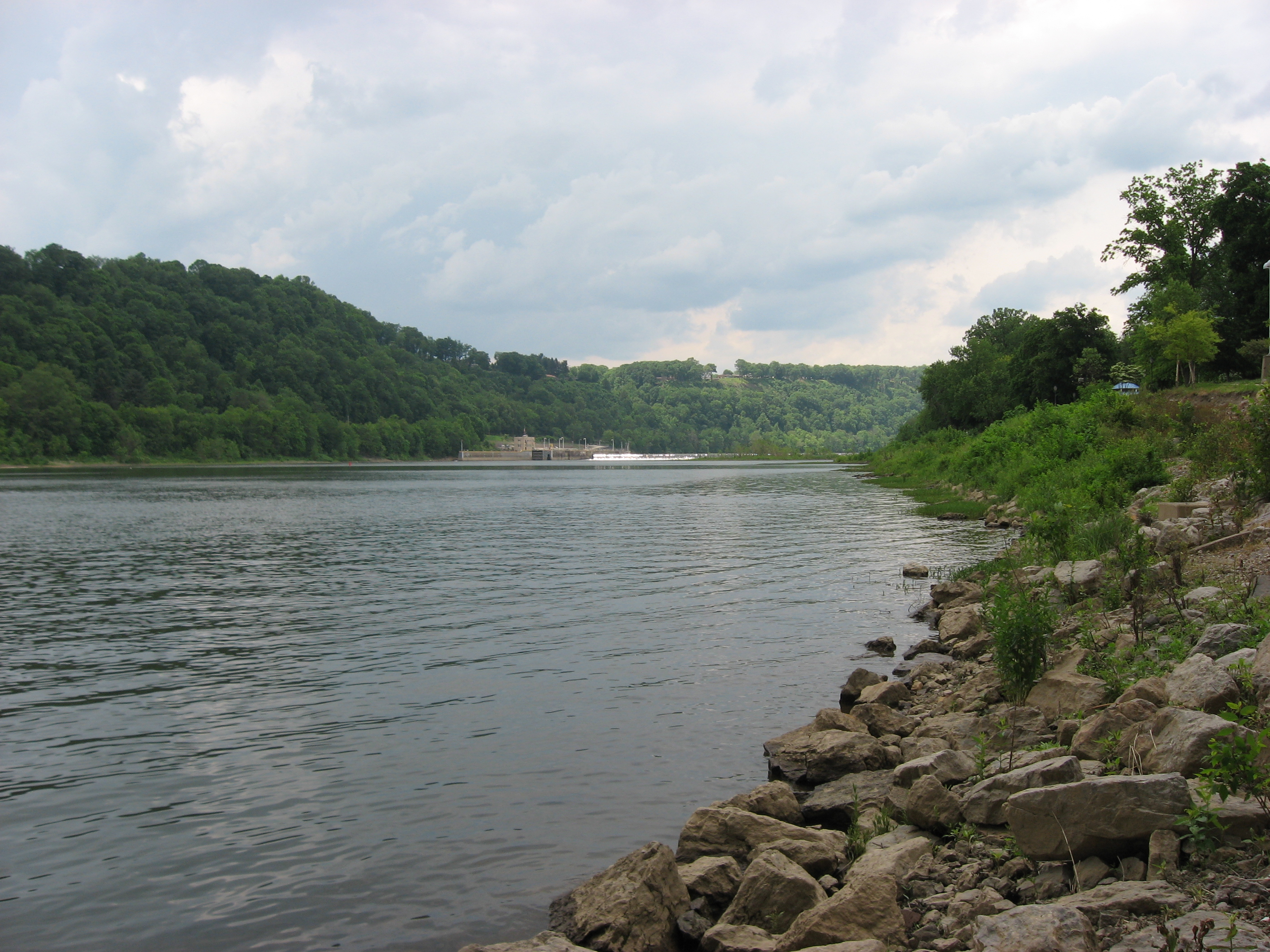
- Allegheny River Lock and Dam No. 7, June 2008

- Location within Pennsylvania Location within the United States
- Location: Along PA 4023, 0.6 mi. N of Kittanning Br., East Franklin Township, Pennsylvania and Kittanning, Pennsylvania
- Coordinates: 40°49′16″N 79°31′44″W
- Area: 19.3 acres (7.8 ha)
- Built: 1928-1930
- Built by: Dravo Corp.
- Architectural style: Late 19th And 20th Century Revivals
- MPS: Allegheny River Navigation System MPS
- NRHP reference No.: 00000401
- Added to NRHP: April 21, 2000

Allegheny River Lock and Dam No. 7 is a historic lock and fixed-crest dam complex located at East Franklin Township, Pennsylvania and Kittanning in Armstrong County, Pennsylvania. It was built between 1928 and 1930 by the United States Army Corps of Engineers, and consists of the lock, dam, esplanade, and Operations Building. The lock measures 56 feet by 360 feet, and has a lift of 13.0 feet. The dam measures approximately 20 feet high and 916 feet long. The Operations Building, or powerhouse, is a utilitarian two-story building in a vernacular early-20th century revival style. The lock and dam were built by the U.S. Army Corps of Engineers as a part of an extensive system of locks and dams to improve navigation along the Allegheny River.

It was listed on the National Register of Historic Places in 2000.
