= Bridge between Madison and Mahoning Townships =

- U.S. National Register of Historic Places
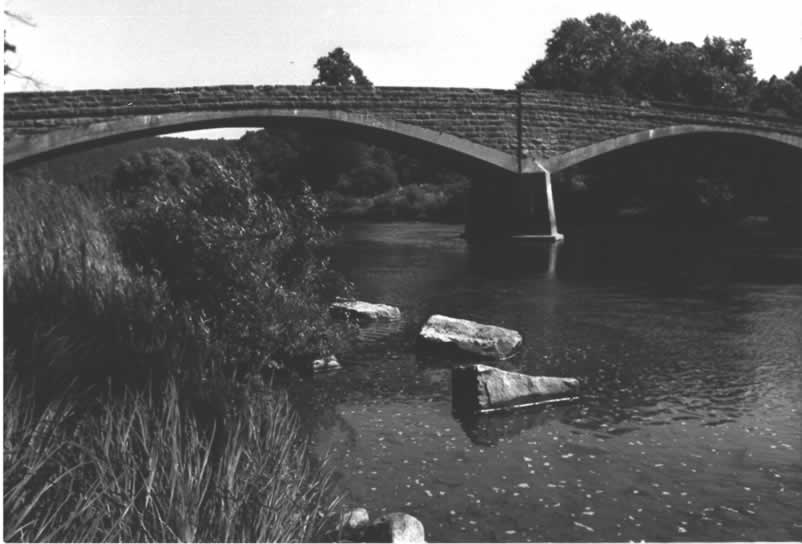
- Bridge between Madison and Mahoning Townships, 1982

- Location within Pennsylvania Location within the United States
- Location: Legislative Route 03178 over Mahoning Creek near Deanville, Madison Township, Pennsylvania and Mahoning Township, Pennsylvania
- Coordinates: 40°55′52″N 79°23′18″W
- Area: less than one acre
- Built: 1895
- Architectural style: Solid spandrel arch
- MPS: Highway Bridges Owned by the Commonwealth of Pennsylvania, Department of Transportation TR
- NRHP reference No.: 88000798
- Added to NRHP: June 22, 1988

The Bridge between Madison and Mahoning Townships is a historic concrete arch bridge located at Madison Township and Mahoning Township in Armstrong County, Pennsylvania. It was built in 1895, and is a solid spandrel 181-foot-long (55 m) two-span bridge. It crosses Mahoning Creek.

It was listed on the National Register of Historic Places in 1988.
