= St. Stephen's Church (Bradys Bend, Pennsylvania) =

Historic church in Pennsylvania, United States

- U.S. National Register of Historic Places
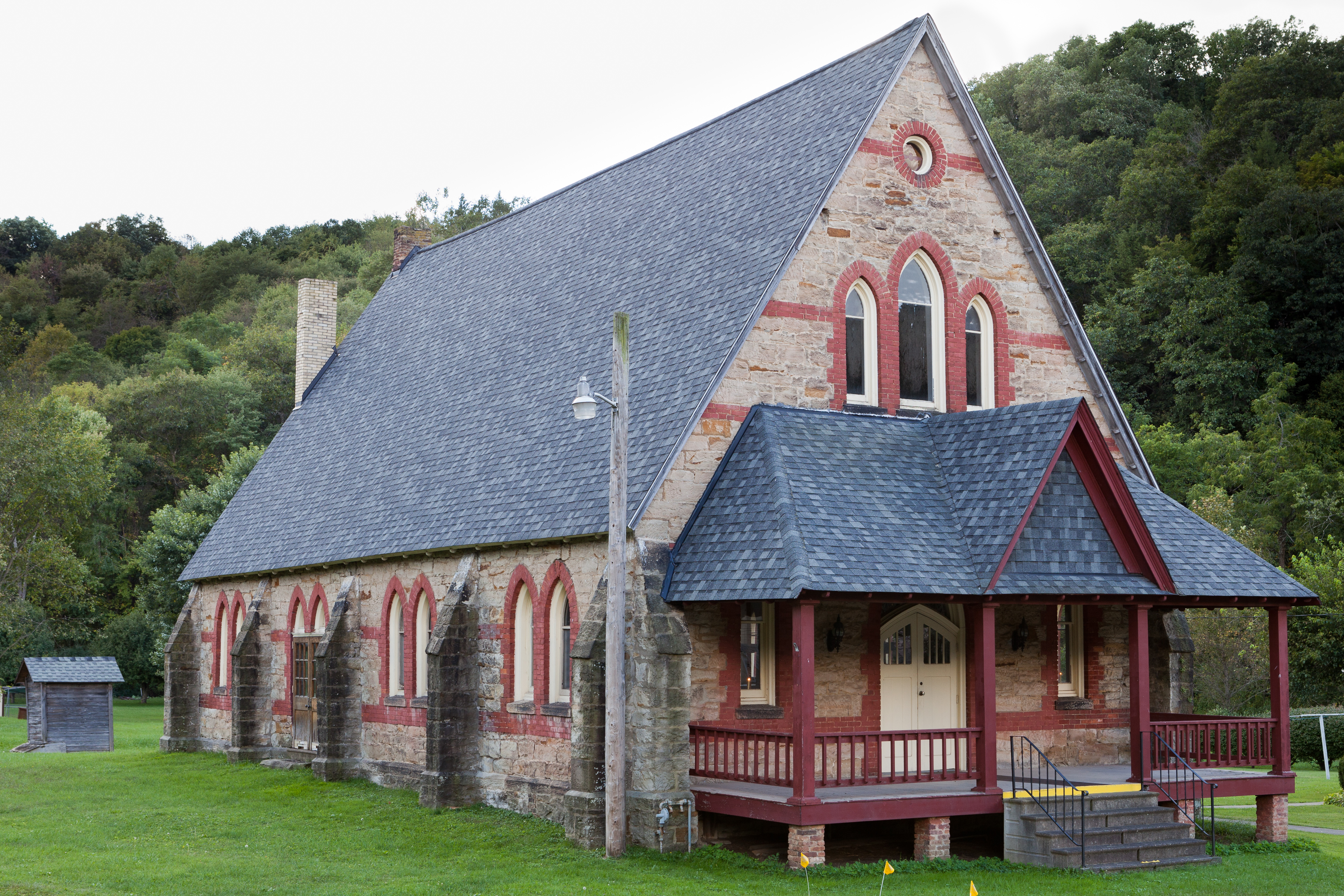

- Location within Pennsylvania Location within the United States
- Location: PA 68, Brady's Bend, Pennsylvania
- Coordinates: 40°59′40″N 79°37′51″W
- Area: 0.5 acres (0.20 ha)
- Built: 1867
- Architectural style: Gothic Revival
- NRHP reference No.: 80003408
- Added to NRHP: June 30, 1980

St. Stephen's Church is a historic Episcopal church located in Brady's Bend Township, Armstrong County, Pennsylvania. It was built in 1867, and is a one-story, sandstone building in the Gothic Revival style. It is 36 feet (11 m) wide and 68 feet (21 m) deep, with a steeply pitched gable roof. It was transformed in 1925 to serve as a community meeting hall.

It was listed on the National Register of Historic Places in 1980.
