= Sugarcreek Township, Pennsylvania =

Township in Pennsylvania, US

Coordinates: 40°55′29″N 79°38′15″W

- Township
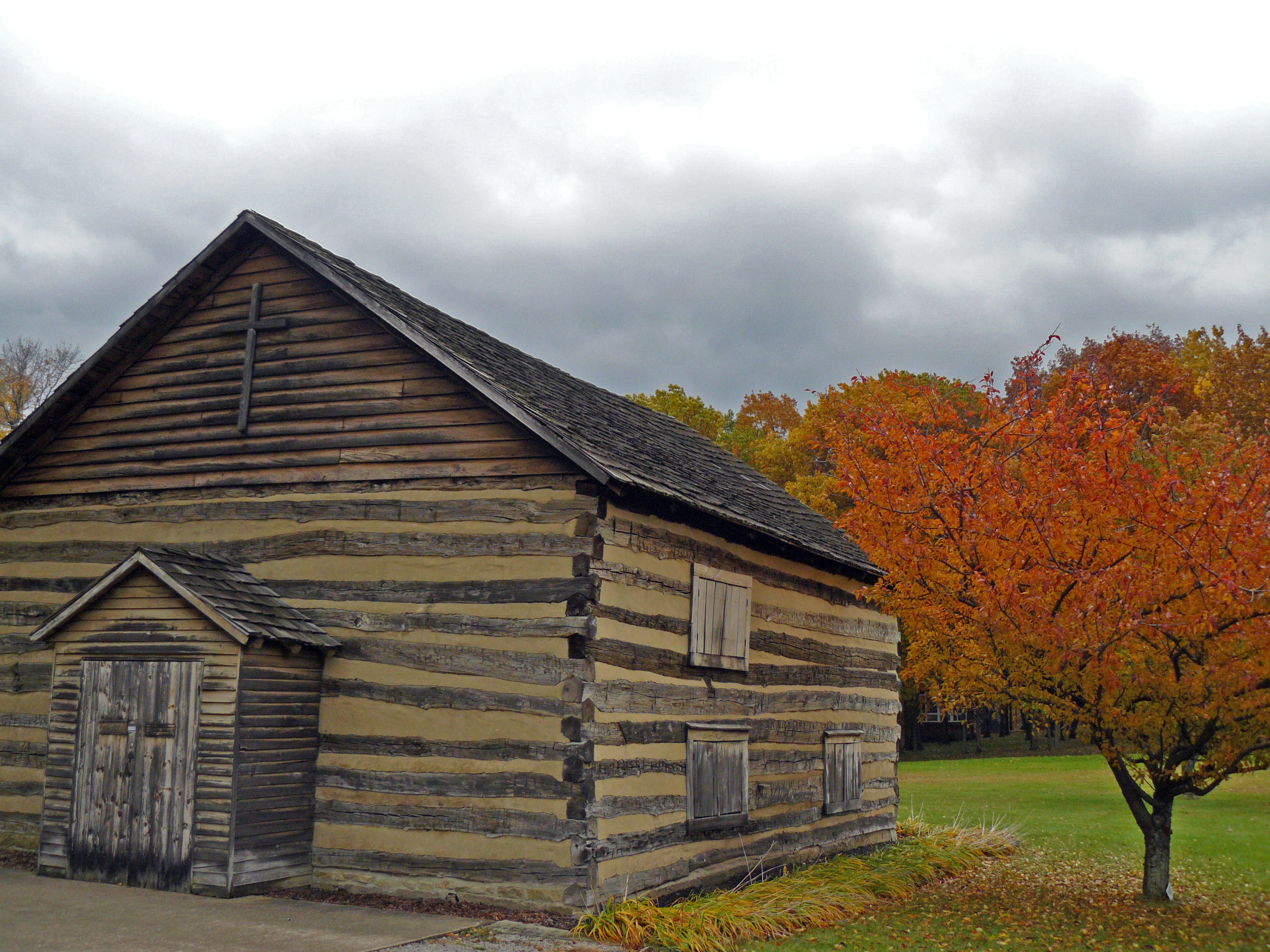
- St. Patrick's Catholic Church, built 1805

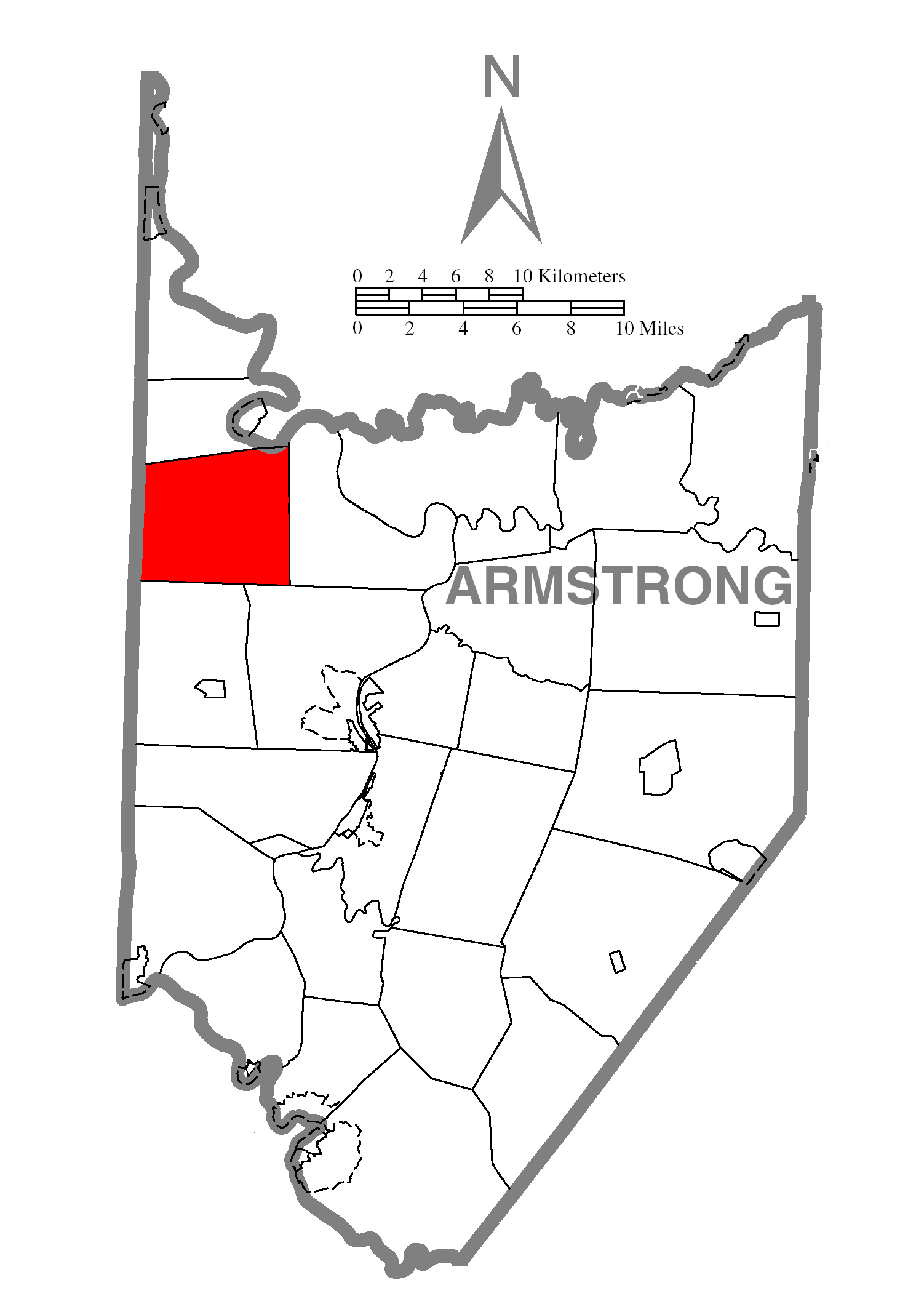
- Map of Armstrong County, Pennsylvania, highlighting Sugarcreek Township

- Map of Armstrong County, Pennsylvania
- Country: United States
- State: Pennsylvania
- County: Armstrong
- Settled: 1800
- Incorporated: 1806

Area
  - Total: 26.67 sq mi (69.07 km^{2})
  - Land: 26.67 sq mi (69.07 km^{2})
  - Water: 0 sq mi (0.00 km^{2})

Population (2020)
  - Total: 1,336
  - Estimate (2021): 1,336
  - Density: 55.7/sq mi (21.51/km^{2})
- Time zone: UTC-5 (Eastern (EST))
  - Summer (DST): UTC-4 (EDT)
- FIPS code: 42-005-74992
- Website: https://sugarcreektwppa.com/

Sugarcreek Township is a township in Armstrong County, Pennsylvania, United States. The population was 1,336 at the 2020 census, a decrease from the figure of 1,539 tabulated in 2010.

== History ==
Sugarcreek Township and most of the surrounding areas were originally settled in the early 18th century by emigrants from Ireland.

St. Patrick's Roman Catholic Church was listed on the National Register of Historic Places in 1978.

Sugar Creek Township appears in the 1876 Atlas of Armstrong County, Pennsylvania.

== Geography ==
Sugarcreek Township is located in northwestern Armstrong County. Its western border is the Butler County line, and it touches the Allegheny River at its northeast corner.

According to the United States Census Bureau, the township has a total area of 26.7 square miles (69.1 km^{2}), all land.

== Recreation ==
Portions of the Pennsylvania State Game Lands Number 105 and Number 259 are located in Sugarcreek Township.

== Demographics ==
Historical population
Census	Pop.	Note	%±
2010	1,539		—
2020	1,336		−13.2%
2021 (est.)	1,336		0.0%
U.S. Decennial Census

As of the 2000 census, there were 1,557 people, 523 households, and 403 families residing in the township. The population density was 57.6 inhabitants per square mile (22.2/km^{2}). There were 570 housing units at an average density of 21.1/sq mi (8.1/km^{2}). The racial makeup of the township was 98.07% White, 1.67% African American, 0.06% Native American, and 0.19% from two or more races. Hispanic or Latino of any race were 0.51% of the population.

There were 523 households, out of which 33.7% had children under the age of 18 living with them, 62.7% were married couples living together, 9.0% had a female householder with no husband present, and 22.9% were non-families. 20.7% of all households were made up of individuals, and 11.7% had someone living alone who was 65 years of age or older. The average household size was 2.60 and the average family size was 2.99.

The township median age of 43 years was significantly more than the county median age of 40 years. The distribution by age group was 21.3% under the age of 18, 6.0% from 18 to 24, 26.0% from 25 to 44, 23.6% from 45 to 64, and 23.2% who were 65 years of age or older. The median age was 43 years. For every 100 females there were 100.1 males. For every 100 females age 18 and over, there were 102.0 males.

The median income for a household in the township was $33,750, and the median income for a family was $37,222. Males had a median income of $30,357 versus $18,704 for females. The per capita income for the township was $16,903. About 7.5% of families and 10.6% of the population were below the poverty line, including 15.3% of those under age 18 and 9.2% of those age 65 or over.

== Education ==
- Karns City Area School District - public school
- Karns City High School

== Cemeteries ==
- Mount Pleasant Lutheran Cemetery
- Oak Grove / Saint Pauls United Church of Christ Cemetery
- Saint Patricks Cemetery
- Simpson / Templeton Cemetery
