= Washington Township, Armstrong County, Pennsylvania =

Township in Pennsylvania, US

- Township
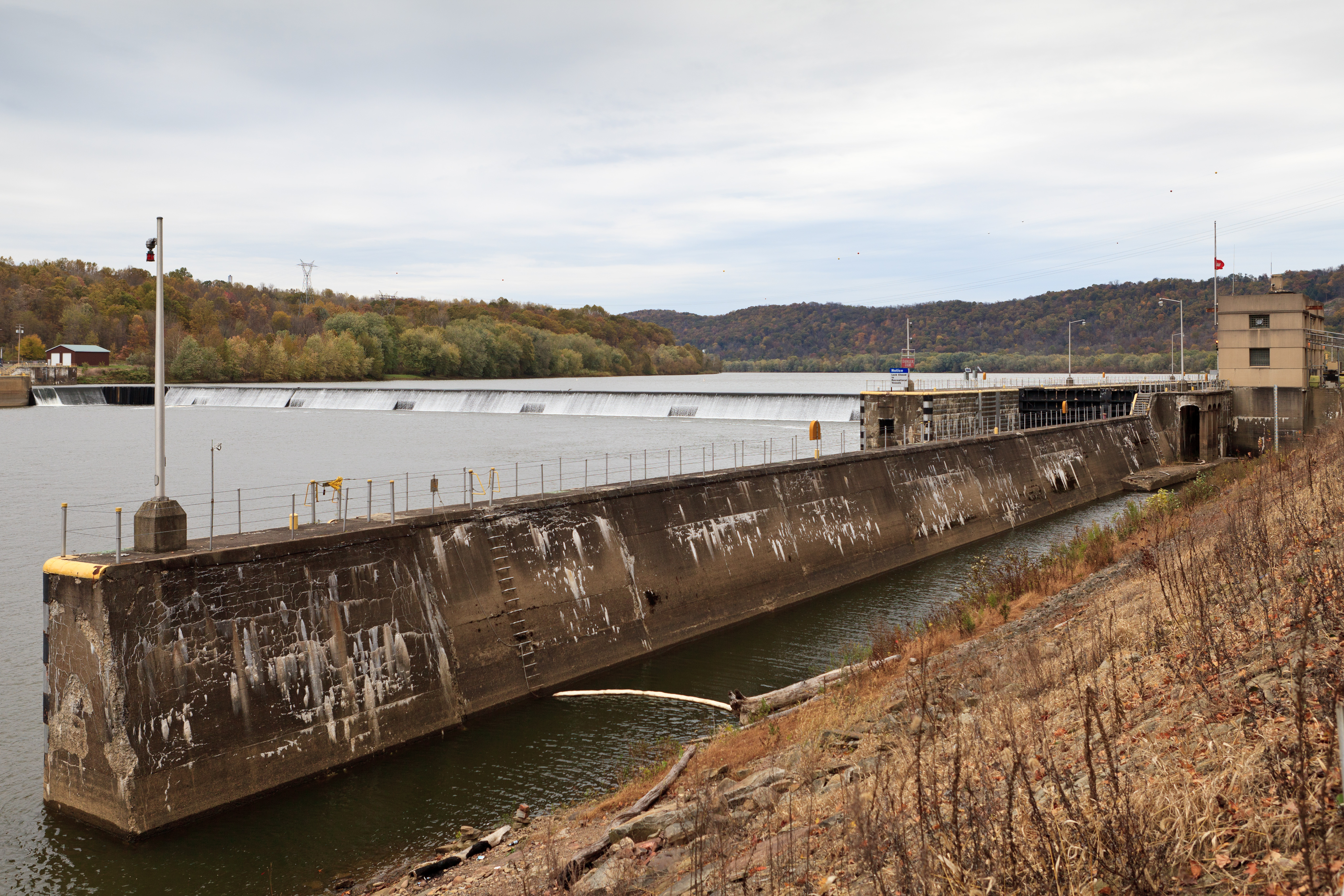
- The Allegheny River Lock and Dam No. 8

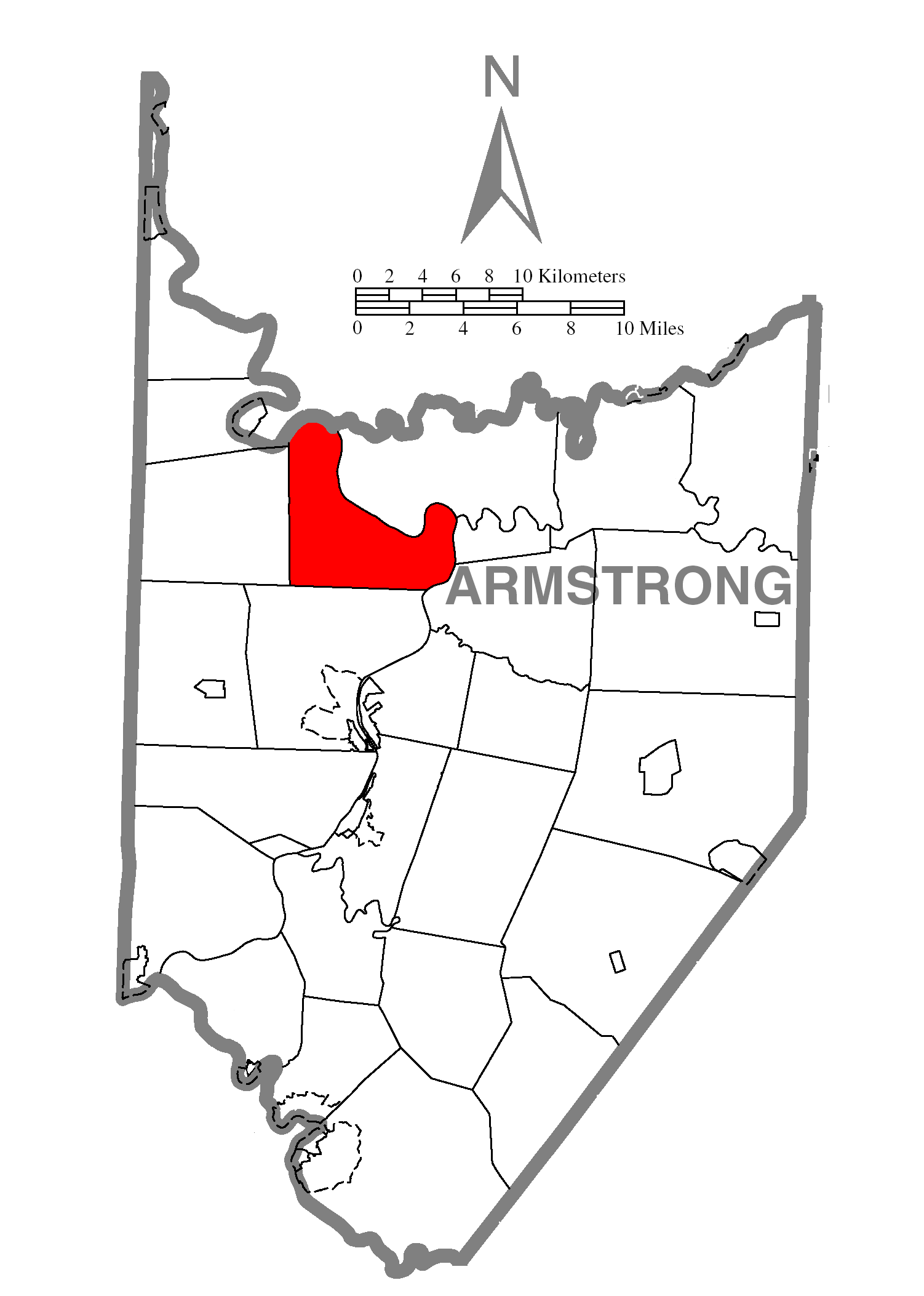
- Map of Armstrong County, Pennsylvania, highlighting Washington Township

- Map of Armstrong County, Pennsylvania
- Coordinates: 40°55′33″N 79°32′34″W
- Country: United States
- State: Pennsylvania
- County: Armstrong
- Settled: 1771
- Incorporated: 1858

Area
  - Total: 23.35 sq mi (60.47 km^{2})
  - Land: 22.46 sq mi (58.16 km^{2})
  - Water: 0.90 sq mi (2.32 km^{2})

Population (2020)
  - Total: 898
  - Estimate (2021): 891
  - Density: 42/sq mi (16.2/km^{2})
- Time zone: UTC-5 (Eastern (EST))
  - Summer (DST): UTC-4 (EDT)
- FIPS code: 42-005-81176
- Website: https://washingtontwpacpa.gov/

Washington Township is a township in Armstrong County, Pennsylvania, United States. The population was 898 at the 2020 census, a decrease from 923 at the 2010 census.

== History ==
The Allegheny River Lock and Dam No. 8 and Allegheny River Lock and Dam No. 9 are listed on the National Register of Historic Places.

Washington Township appears in the 1876 Atlas of Armstrong County, Pennsylvania.

== Geography ==
Washington Township is located in northern Armstrong County. It is bordered by the Allegheny River to the north and east, and it touches Clarion County along its northernmost edge.

According to the United States Census Bureau, the township has a total area of 23.4 square miles (60.5 km^{2}), of which 22.5 square miles (58.2 km^{2}) is land and 0.89 square miles (2.3 km^{2}), or 3.83%, is water.

== Recreation ==
A portion of the Pennsylvania State Game Lands Number 105 is located in Washington Township, as well as the Washington Township Memorial Park.

== Demographics ==
Historical population
Census	Pop.	Note	%±
2000	1,029		—
2010	923		−10.3%
2020	898		−2.7%
2021 (est.)	891		−0.8%
U.S. Decennial Census

As of the 2000 census, there were 1,029 people, 389 households, and 296 families residing in the township. The population density was 46.8 inhabitants per square mile (18.1/km^{2}). There were 695 housing units at an average density of 31.6 per square mile (12.2/km^{2}). The racial makeup of the township was 99.42% White, 0.10% African American, 0.29% Pacific Islander, 0.10% from other races, and 0.10% from two or more races. Hispanic or Latino of any race were 0.29% of the population.

There were 389 households, out of which 33.2% had children under the age of 18 living with them, 65.3% were married couples living together, 6.4% had a female householder with no husband present, and 23.9% were non-families. 20.6% of all households were made up of individuals, and 10.3% had someone living alone who was 65 years of age or older. The average household size was 2.65 and the average family size was 3.08.

The township median age of 40 years was the same as the county median age of 40 years. The distribution by age group was 25.6% under the age of 18, 6.8% from 18 to 24, 26.9% from 25 to 44, 26.5% from 45 to 64, and 14.2% who were 65 years of age or older. The median age was 40 years. For every 100 females there were 99.8 males. For every 100 females age 18 and over, there were 101.0 males.

The median income for a household in the township was $26,833, and the median income for a family was $32,313. Males had a median income of $26,000 versus $19,792 for females. The per capita income for the township was $14,977. About 12.3% of families and 13.6% of the population were below the poverty line, including 16.5% of those under age 18 and 9.7% of those age 65 or over.

== Cemeteries ==
- Bowser Cemetery
- Brush Valley Cemetery
- Fair Cemetery
- John Cemetery
- Limestone Church of God Cemetery
- Saint Marks Lutheran Church Cemetery
- Sherrett Cemetery
- Toy Cemetery
- Wattersonville United Methodist Cemetery
