= Dayton, Pennsylvania =

Borough in Pennsylvania, US

- Borough
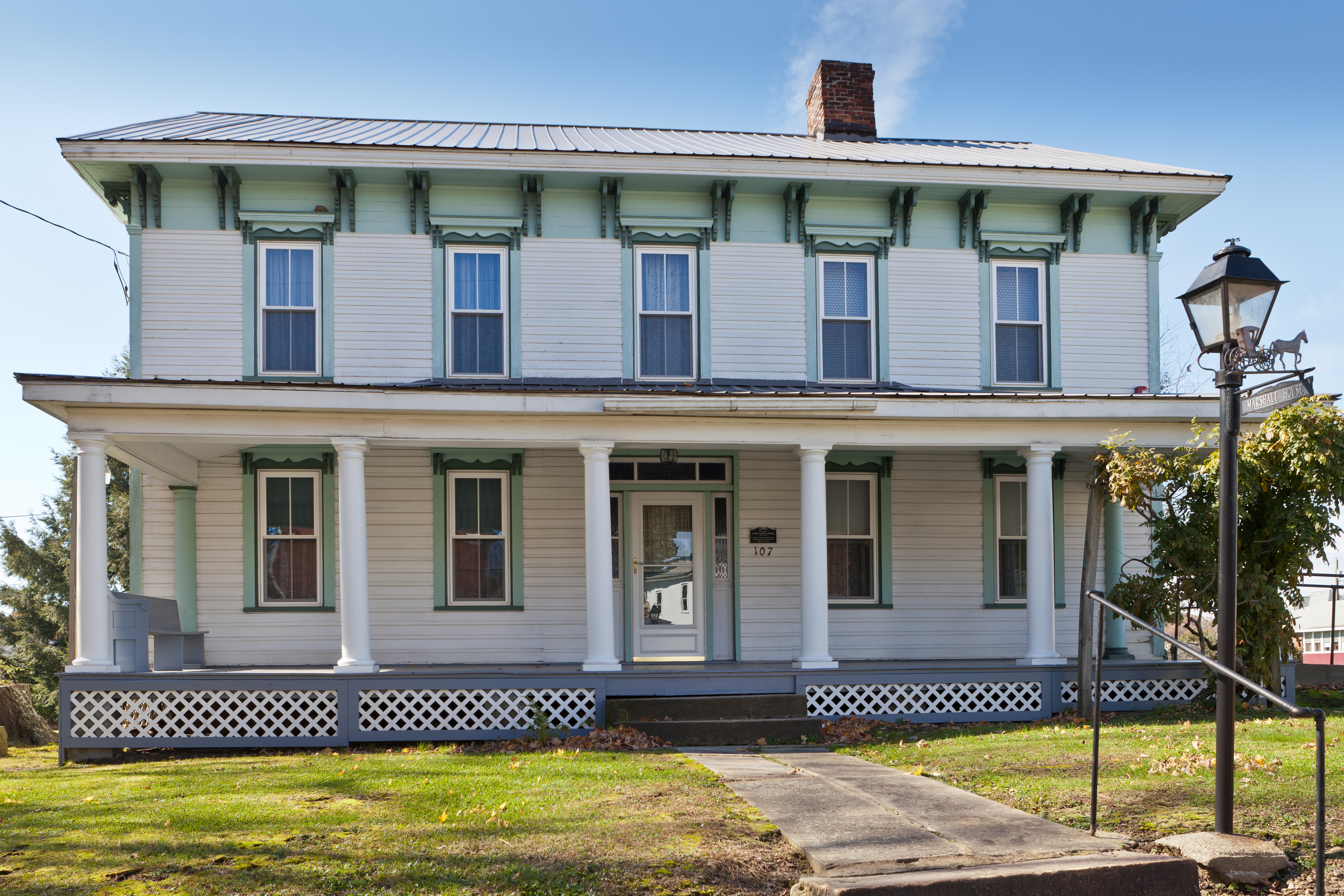
- The Thomas Marshall House

- Location of Dayton in Armstrong County, Pennsylvania.

- Location within Pennsylvania
- Coordinates: 40°52′52″N 79°14′29″W
- Country: United States
- State: Pennsylvania
- County: Armstrong
- Settled: 1850
- Incorporated: 1873

Government
  - Type: Borough Council

Area
  - Total: 0.37 sq mi (0.97 km^{2})
  - Land: 0.37 sq mi (0.97 km^{2})
  - Water: 0 sq mi (0.00 km^{2})
- Elevation: 1,340 ft (410 m)

Population (2020)
  - Total: 549
  - Density: 1,458.9/sq mi (563.27/km^{2})
- Time zone: UTC-5 (Eastern (EST))
  - Summer (DST): UTC-4 (EDT)
- Zip code: 16222
- Area code: 814
- FIPS code: 42-18400

Dayton is a borough in Armstrong County, Pennsylvania, United States. The population was 549 at the 2020 census.

== History ==
The Thomas Marshall House was listed on the National Register of Historic Places in 1976, and is home to the Dayton Area Local History Society.

== Geography ==
Dayton is located at 40°52′52″N 79°14′29″W (40.881095, −79.241526) in eastern Armstrong County. Pennsylvania Route 839 leads south 6 miles (10 km) to Pennsylvania Route 85 near NuMine and north 15 miles (24 km) to Pennsylvania Route 28 in South Bethlehem.

According to the United States Census Bureau, the borough has a total area of 0.39 square miles (1.0 km^{2}), all land.

== Demographics ==
Historical population
Census	Pop.	Note	%±
1880	579		—
1890	372		−35.8%
1900	431		15.9%
1910	809		87.7%
1920	1,049		29.7%
1930	857		−18.3%
1940	882		2.9%
1950	828		−6.1%
1960	769		−7.1%
1970	715		−7.0%
1980	648		−9.4%
1990	572		−11.7%
2000	543		−5.1%
2010	553		1.8%
2020	549		−0.7%

As of the 2000 census, there were 543 people, 229 households, and 150 families residing in the borough. The population density was 1,208.1 inhabitants per square mile (466.5/km^{2}). There were 254 housing units at an average density of 565.1 per square mile (218.2/km^{2}). The racial makeup of the borough was 100.00% White.

There were 229 households, out of which 29.7% had children under the age of 18 living with them, 54.6% were married couples living together, 7.9% had a female householder with no husband present, and 34.1% were non-families. 31.9% of all households were made up of individuals, and 17.0% had someone living alone who was 65 years of age or older. The average household size was 2.37 and the average family size was 2.97.

The borough median age of 42 years was more than the county median age of 40 years. The distribution by age group was 22.7% under the age of 18, 6.6% from 18 to 24, 26.2% from 25 to 44, 23.0% from 45 to 64, and 21.5% who were 65 years of age or older. The median age was 42 years. For every 100 females there were 94.6 males. For every 100 females age 18 and over, there were 89.2 males.

The median income for a household in the borough was $30,156, and the median income for a family was $36,250. Males had a median income of $26,719 versus $18,333 for females. The per capita income for the borough was $15,036. About 5.7% of families and 7.3% of the population were below the poverty line, including 8.5% of those under age 18 and 9.6% of those age 65 or over.

== See also ==
- West Shamokin High School
