= St. Patrick's Roman Catholic Church (Cowansville, Pennsylvania) =

Historic church in Pennsylvania, United States

- U.S. National Register of Historic Places
- Pennsylvania state historical marker
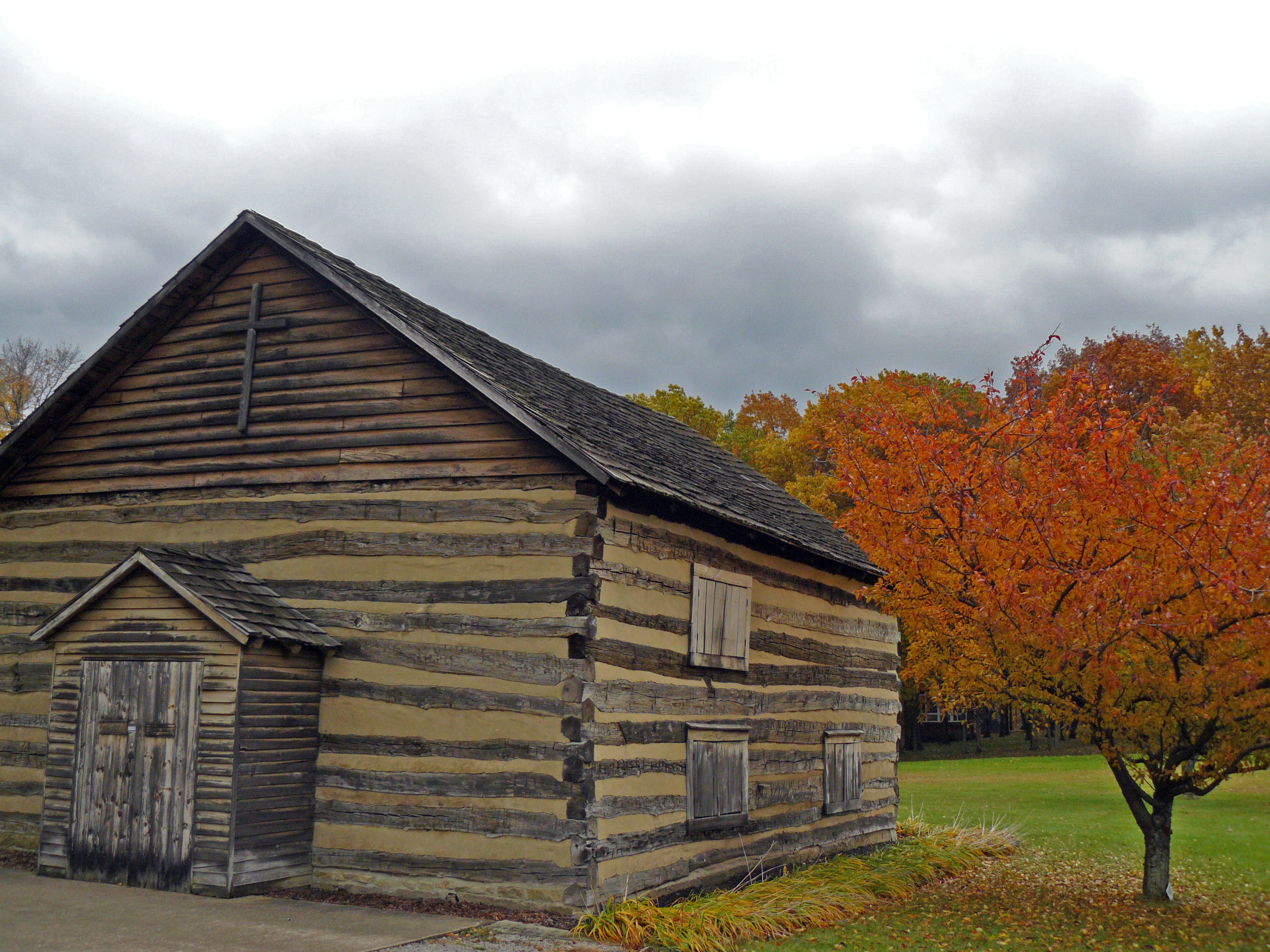
- St. Patrick's Roman Catholic Church, October 2009

- Location within Pennsylvania Location within the United States
- Location: West of Cowansville off Pennsylvania Route 268, Sugarcreek Township, Pennsylvania
- Coordinates: 40°53′45″N 79°40′37″W
- Area: 0.2 acres (0.081 ha)
- Built: 1805
- Architectural style: Log building
- NRHP reference No.: 78002340

Significant dates
- Added to NRHP: March 21, 1978
- Designated PHMC: July 16, 1946

St. Patrick's Roman Catholic Church is a historic Roman Catholic church located near Cowansville in Sugarcreek Township, Armstrong County, Pennsylvania, USA, within the Diocese of Greensburg.

== Description ==
St. Patrick's was built in 1805, and is a log building measuring 22 by 35 feet (6.7 m × 10.7 m). It has a gable roof and three windows on each side. It is the oldest Catholic church still standing in Western Pennsylvania.

It was listed on the National Register of Historic Places in 1978.
