= Madison Township, Armstrong County, Pennsylvania =

Township in Pennsylvania, US

Coordinates: 40°57′39″N 79°27′47″W

- Township
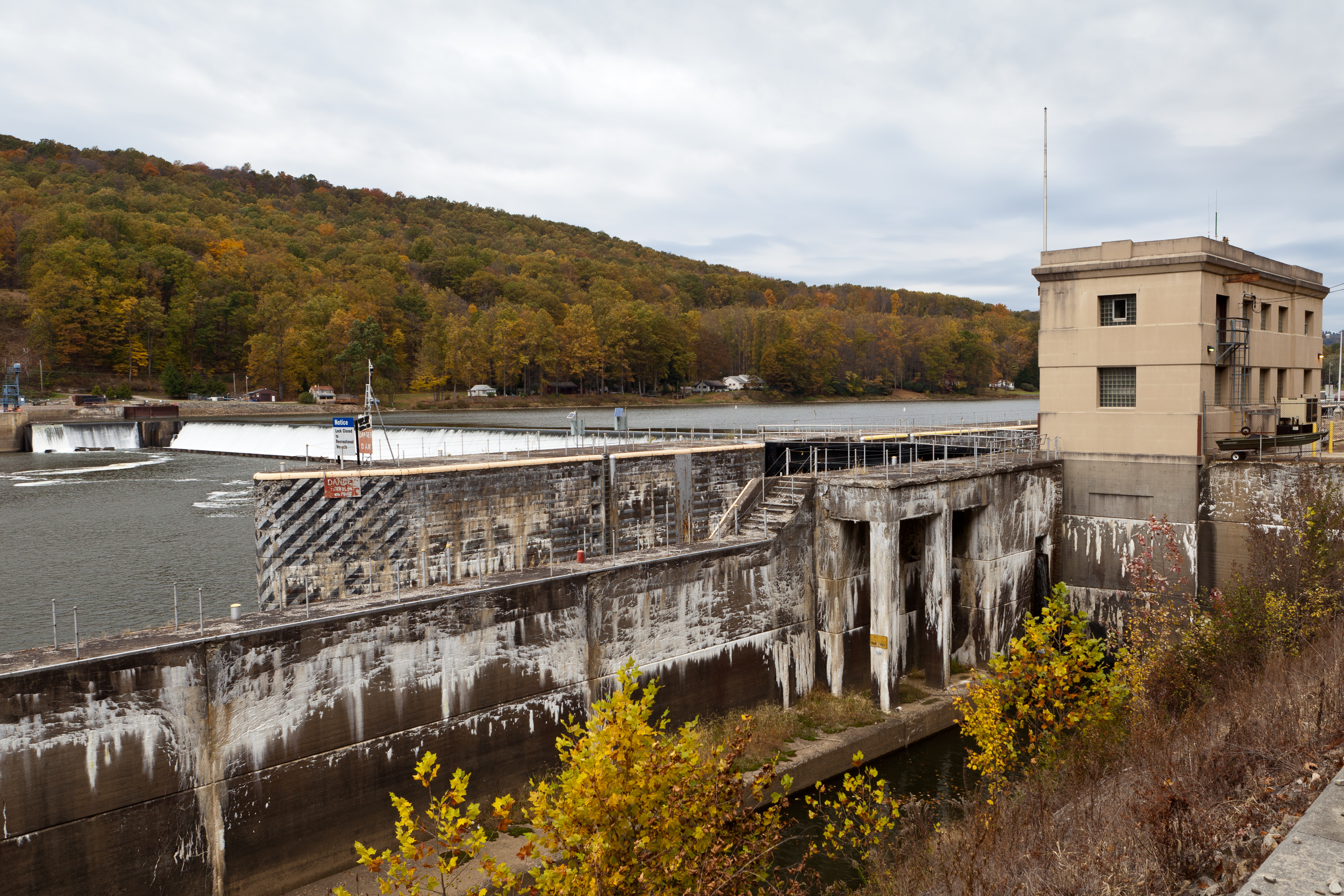
- Allegheny River Lock and Dam No. 9

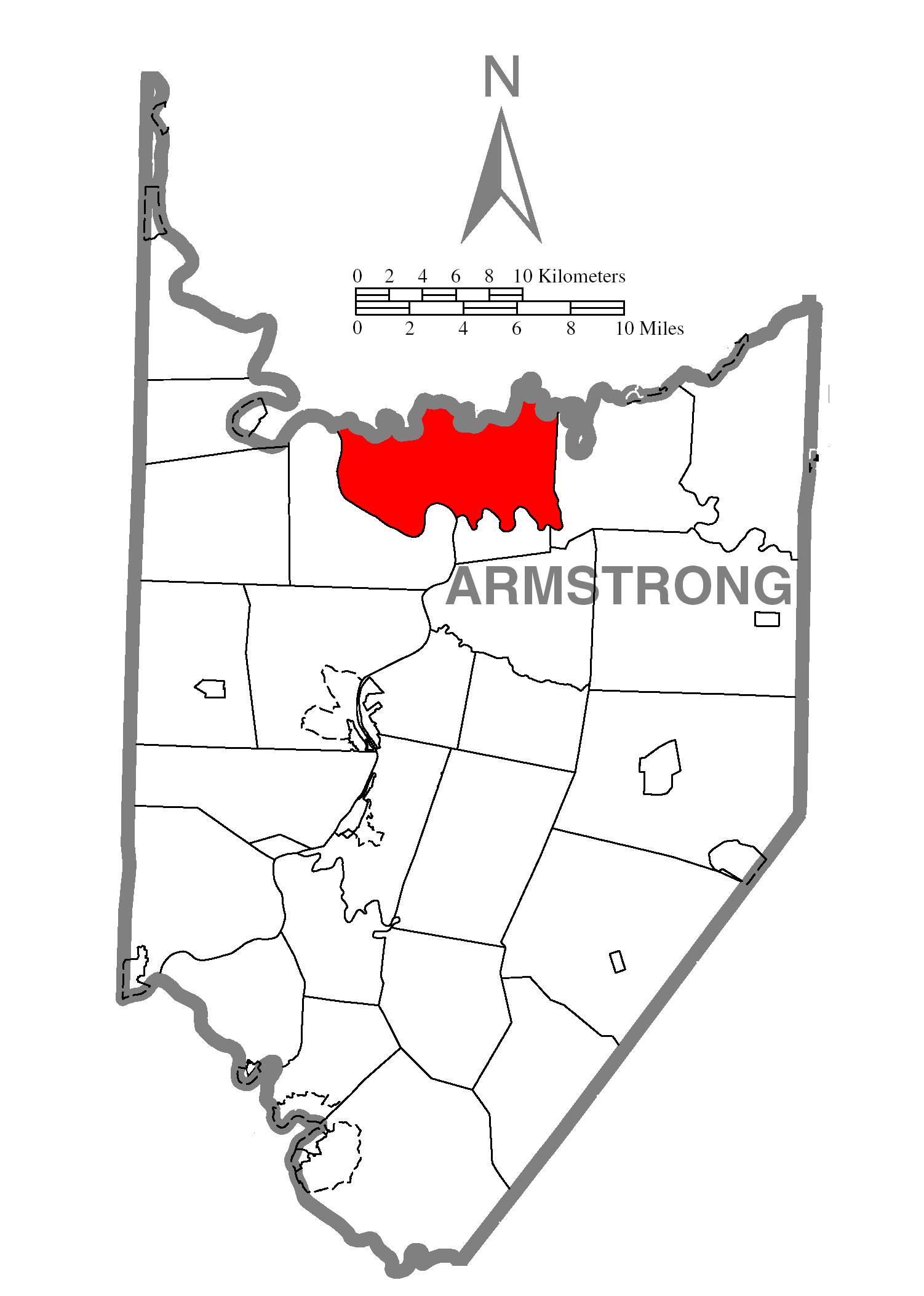
- Map of Armstrong County, Pennsylvania, highlighting Madison Township

- Map of Armstrong County, Pennsylvania
- Country: United States
- State: Pennsylvania
- County: Armstrong
- Settled: 1824
- Incorporated: 1837

Area
  - Total: 30.92 sq mi (80.07 km^{2})
  - Land: 30.03 sq mi (77.78 km^{2})
  - Water: 0.89 sq mi (2.30 km^{2})

Population (2020)
  - Total: 826
  - Estimate (2021): 820
  - Density: 26.0/sq mi (10.04/km^{2})
- Time zone: UTC-5 (Eastern (EST))
  - Summer (DST): UTC-4 (EDT)
- FIPS code: 42-005-46456

Madison Township is a township in Armstrong County, Pennsylvania, United States. The population was 826 at the 2020 census, an increase over the figure of 820 tabulated in 2010.

== History ==
The Allegheny River Lock and Dam No. 9 and Bridge between Madison and Mahoning Townships are listed on the National Register of Historic Places.

Madison Township appears in the 1876 Atlas of Armstrong County, Pennsylvania. Its early history is detailed in Robert Walter Smith's 1883 History of Armstrong County.

== Geography ==
Madison Township is located along the northern edge of Armstrong County and is bordered on three sides by waterways: Mahoning Creek to the south, the Allegheny River to the south and west, and Redbank Creek

According to the United States Census Bureau, the township has a total area of 30.9 square miles (80.1 km^{2}), of which 30.0 square miles (77.8 km^{2}) is land and 0.89 square miles (2.3 km^{2}), or 2.87%, is water.

== Recreation ==
A portion of Pennsylvania State Game Lands Number 287 is located in the south of Madison Township.

== Demographics ==
Historical population
Census	Pop.	Note	%±
2010	820		—
2020	826		0.7%
2021 (est.)	820		−0.7%
U.S. Decennial Census

As of the 2000 census, there were 943 people, 362 households, and 258 families residing in the township. The population density was 31.1 inhabitants per square mile (12.0/km^{2}). There were 566 housing units at an average density of 18.7/sq mi (7.2/km^{2}). The racial makeup of the township was 98.94% White, 0.42% African American, 0.11% Native American, and 0.53% from two or more races. Hispanic or Latino of any race were 0.53% of the population.

There were 362 households, out of which 31.5% had children under the age of 18 living with them, 62.7% were married couples living together, 4.7% had a female householder with no husband present, and 28.5% were non-families. 26.0% of all households were made up of individuals, and 13.8% had someone living alone who was 65 years of age or older. The average household size was 2.60 and the average family size was 3.12.

The township median age of 38 years was less than that of the county median age of 40 years. The distribution by age group was 24.4% under the age of 18, 8.1% from 18 to 24, 26.8% from 25 to 44, 25.6% from 45 to 64, and 15.2% who were 65 years of age or older. The median age was 38 years. For every 100 females there were 106.3 males. For every 100 females age 18 and over, there were 100.8 males.

The median income for a household in the township was $26,875, and the median income for a family was $35,156. Males had a median income of $30,227 versus $16,667 for females. The per capita income for the township was $12,583. About 14.5% of families and 19.3% of the population were below the poverty line, including 25.1% of those under age 18 and 21.3% of those age 65 or over.

== Cemeteries ==
- Duncan Cemetery
- Kellersburg Lutheran Cemetery
- Kellersburg Methodist Cemetery
- Reynolds Cemetery
- Rimer Hill Cemetery
- Saint Marys Episcopal Cemetery
- Tidal Cemetery
- Widnoon Methodist Cemetery
