= Brady's Bend Township, Pennsylvania =

Township in Pennsylvania, US

Coordinates: 41°00′03″N 79°36′59″W

- Township
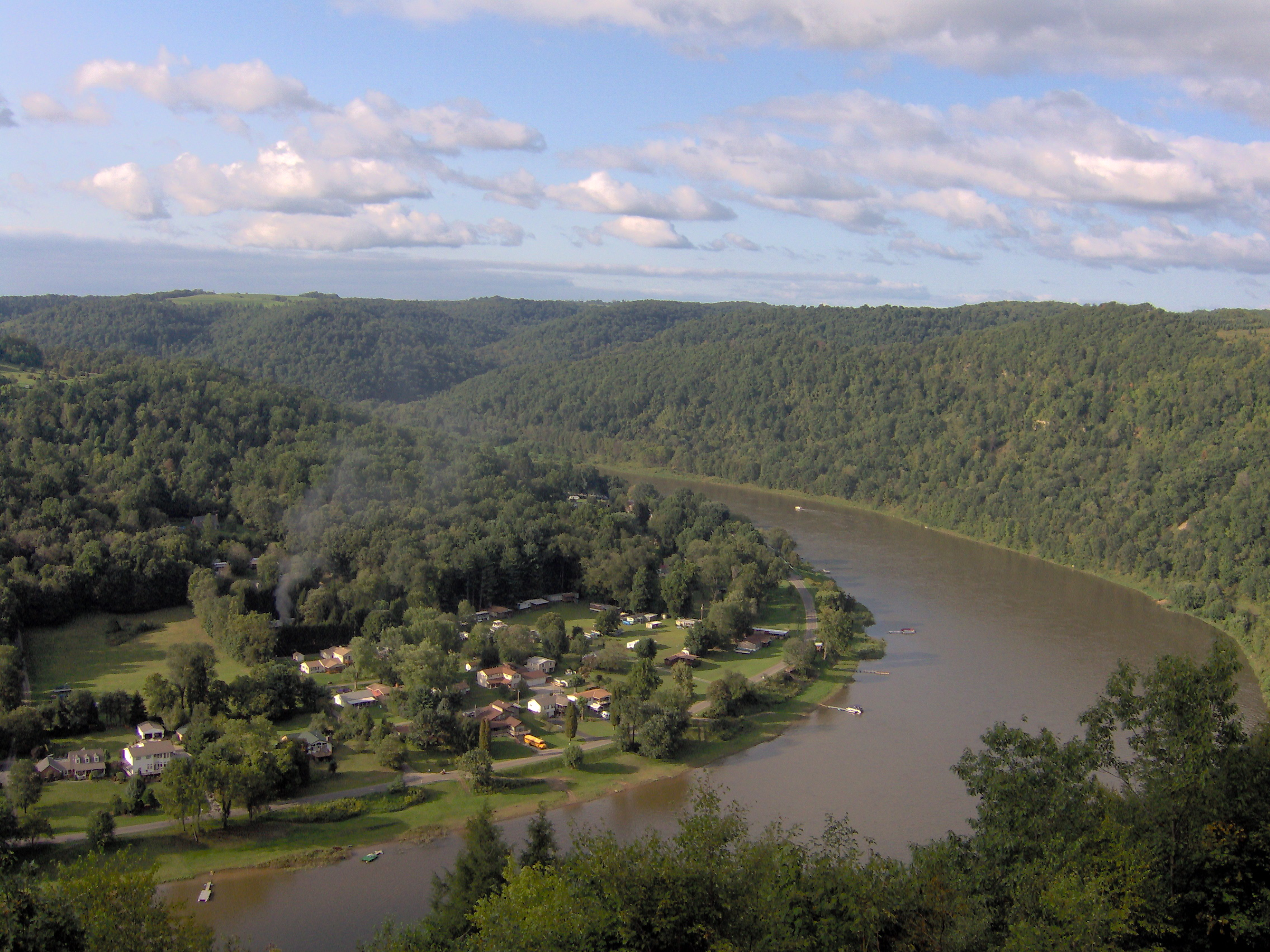
- Along the Allegheny River; Bradys Bend Township is the lower area at left

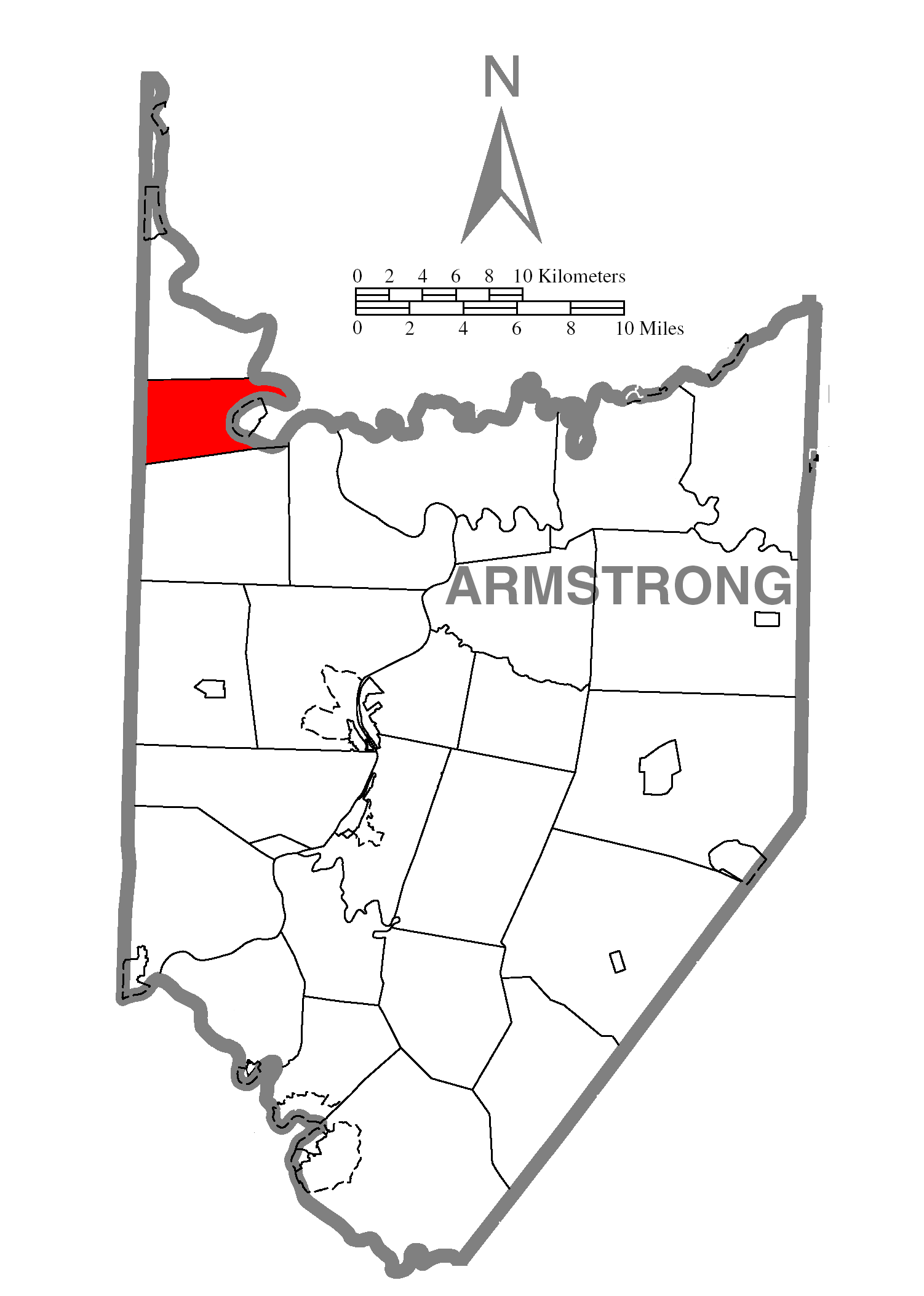
- Map of Armstrong County, Pennsylvania highlighting Bradys Bend Township

- Map of Armstrong County, Pennsylvania
- Country: United States
- State: Pennsylvania
- County: Armstrong
- Settled: 1784
- Incorporated: 1845

Area
  - Total: 12.61 sq mi (32.67 km^{2})
  - Land: 12.61 sq mi (32.67 km^{2})
  - Water: 0 sq mi (0.00 km^{2})

Population (2010)
  - Total: 784
  - Estimate (2021): 780
  - Density: 58.1/sq mi (22.44/km^{2})
- Time zone: UTC-5 (Eastern (EST))
  - Summer (DST): UTC-4 (EDT)
- FIPS code: 42-005-08152
- Website: www.bradysbendtownship.com

Brady's Bend Township is a township in Armstrong County, Pennsylvania, United States. The population was 784 at the 2020 census, an increase from the figure of 773 tabulated in 2010.

== History ==
The Bradys Bend Iron Company Furnaces and St. Stephen's Church are listed on the National Register of Historic Places.

== Geography ==
According to the United States Census Bureau, the township has a total area of 12.6 square miles (32.7 km^{2}), all land.

== Recreation ==
Portions of the Pennsylvania State Game Lands Number 105 are located in Brady's Bend Township.

== Demographics ==
Historical population
Census	Pop.	Note	%±
2010	773		—
2020	784		1.4%
2021 (est.)	780		−0.5%
U.S. Decennial Census

As of the 2000 census, there were 939 people, 392 households, and 279 families residing in the township. The population density was 73.9 inhabitants per square mile (28.5/km^{2}). There were 582 housing units at an average density of 45.8 per square mile (17.7/km^{2}). The racial makeup of the township was 98.72% White, 0.53%|African American, 0.21% Asian, and 0.53% from two or more races.

There were 392 households, out of which 29.1% had children under the age of 18 living with them, 57.7% were married couples living together, 8.2% had a female householder with no husband present, and 28.8% were non-families. 25.3% of all households were made up of individuals, and 14.0% had someone living alone who was 65 years of age or older. The average household size was 2.38 and the average family size was 2.82.

The median age of 41 years was slightly more than that of the county of 40 years. The distribution was 21.7% under the age of 18, 5.6% from 18 to 24, 29.0% from 25 to 44, 27.9% from 45 to 64, and 15.8% who were 65 years of age or older. The median age was 41 years. For every 100 females there were 105.0 males. For every 100 females age 18 and over, there were 97.6 males.

The median income for a household in the township was $29,286, and the median income for a family was $38,036. Males had a median income of $28,594 versus $19,205 for females. The per capita income for the township was $17,797. About 13.1% of families and 17.3% of the population were below the poverty line, including 25.8% of those under age 18 and 15.2% of those age 65 or over.

== Cemeteries ==
- Brady's Bend Cemetery
- Saint Marys Cemetery
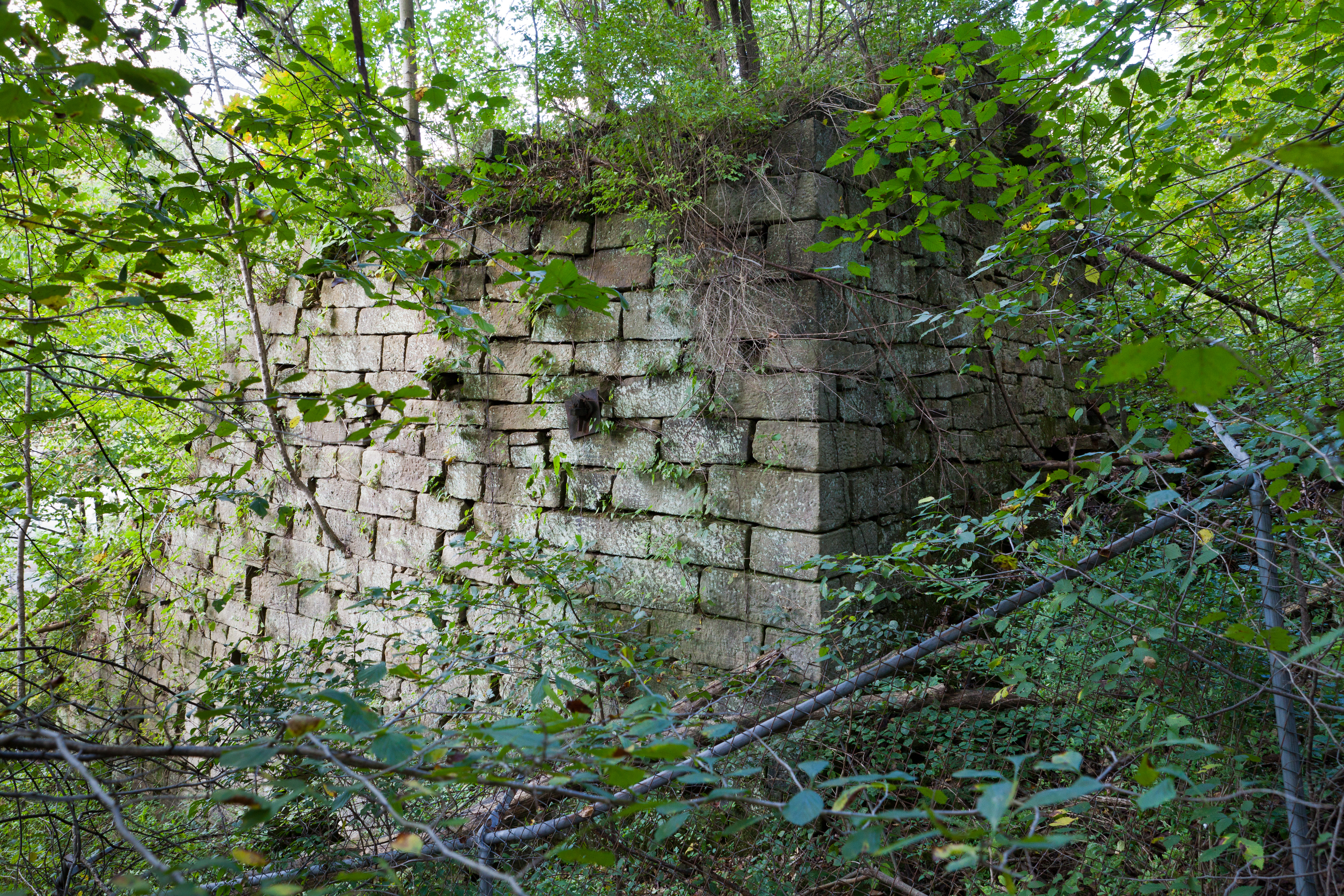
Brady's Bend Iron Company Furnace

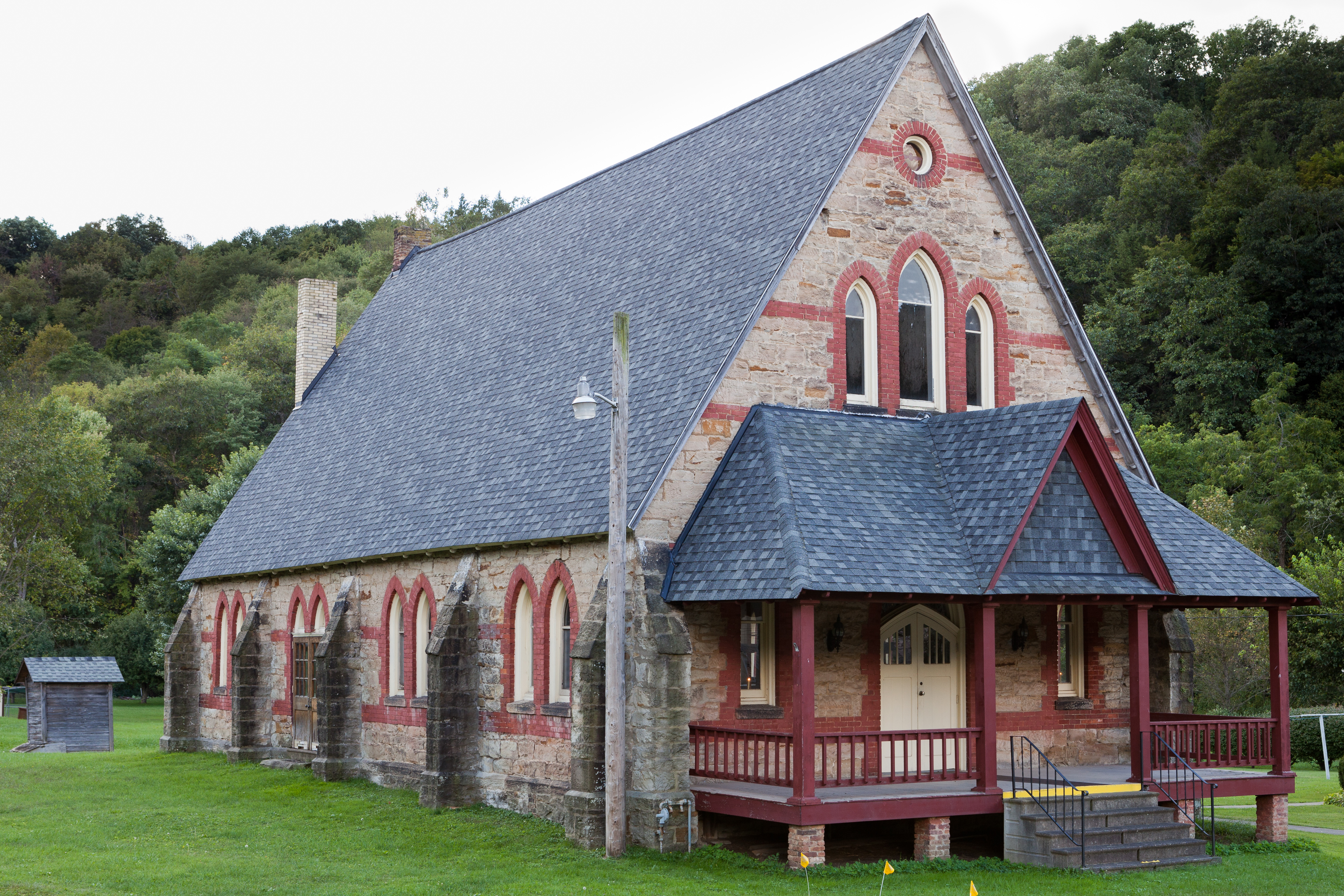
St. Stephen's Church

Brady's Bend Township appears in the 1876 Atlas of Armstrong County, Pennsylvania.
