= Mahoning Township, Armstrong County, Pennsylvania =

Township in Pennsylvania, US

Coordinates: 40°57′26″N 79°20′38″W

- Township
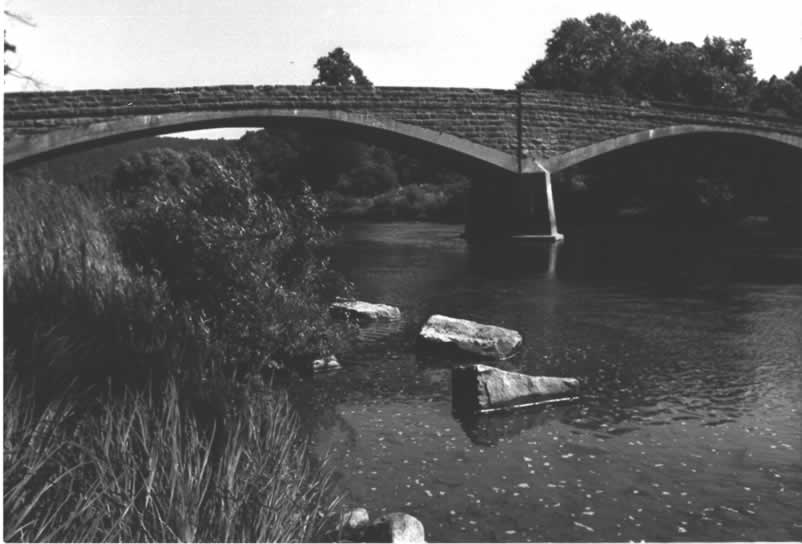
- The historic bridge between Madison and Mahoning Townships

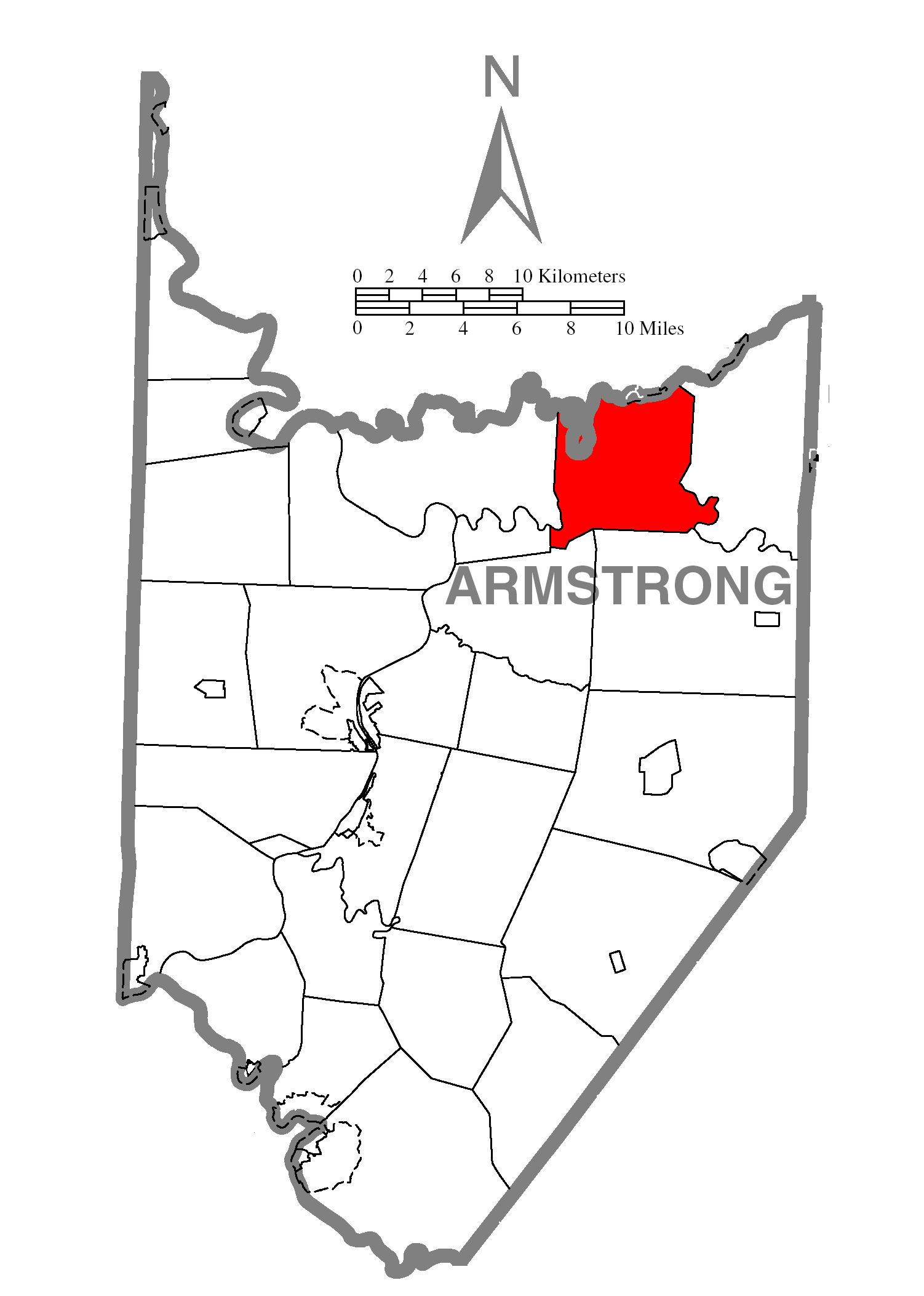
- Map of Armstrong County, Pennsylvania, highlighting Mahoning Township

- Map of Armstrong County, Pennsylvania
- Country: United States
- State: Pennsylvania
- County: Armstrong
- Settled: 1787
- Incorporated: 1851

Area
  - Total: 25.22 sq mi (65.32 km^{2})
  - Land: 24.78 sq mi (64.19 km^{2})
  - Water: 0.44 sq mi (1.13 km^{2})

Population (2020)
  - Total: 1,406
  - Estimate (2021): 1,393
  - Density: 54.8/sq mi (21.16/km^{2})
- Time zone: UTC-5 (Eastern (EST))
  - Summer (DST): UTC-4 (EDT)
- FIPS code: 42-005-46632

Mahoning Township is a township in Armstrong County, Pennsylvania, United States. The population was 1,406 at the 2020 census, a decrease from 1,425 at the 2010 census.

== History ==
The bridge between Madison and Mahoning Townships and Colwell Cut Viaduct are listed on the National Register of Historic Places.

Mahoning Township appears in the 1876 Atlas of Armstrong County, Pennsylvania. Its early history is detailed in Robert Walter Smith's 1883 History of Armstrong County.

== Geography ==
Mahoning Township is located along the northern border of Armstrong County and is bordered by Clarion County to the north across the river.

According to the United States Census Bureau, the township has a total area of 25.2 square miles (65.3 km^{2}), of which 24.8 square miles (64.2 km^{2}) is land and 0.42 square miles (1.1 km^{2}), or 1.73%, is water.

== Climate ==
According to the Köppen Climate Classification system, has a warm-summer humid continental climate, abbreviated "Dfb" on climate maps. The hottest temperature recorded at Putneyville Dam was 103 °F (39.4 °C) on July 17, 1988, while the coldest temperature recorded was −22 °F (−30.0 °C) on January 20, 1994, and February 25, 2015.

Climate data for Putneyville Dam, Pennsylvania, 1991–2020 normals, extremes 1943–present
Month	Jan	Feb	Mar	Apr	May	Jun	Jul	Aug	Sep	Oct	Nov	Dec	Year
Record high °F (°C)	73 (23)	73 (23)	84 (29)	90 (32)	92 (33)	100 (38)	103 (39)	99 (37)	96 (36)	88 (31)	80 (27)	73 (23)	103 (39)
Mean maximum °F (°C)	58.3 (14.6)	59.8 (15.4)	70.8 (21.6)	80.5 (26.9)	86.1 (30.1)	88.9 (31.6)	90.7 (32.6)	89.4 (31.9)	86.9 (30.5)	79.5 (26.4)	69.1 (20.6)	59.9 (15.5)	92.2 (33.4)
Mean daily maximum °F (°C)	34.6 (1.4)	37.6 (3.1)	46.9 (8.3)	61.0 (16.1)	70.8 (21.6)	78.3 (25.7)	82.2 (27.9)	81.1 (27.3)	74.4 (23.6)	62.4 (16.9)	49.8 (9.9)	39.4 (4.1)	59.9 (15.5)
Daily mean °F (°C)	25.8 (−3.4)	27.6 (−2.4)	35.7 (2.1)	47.8 (8.8)	58.0 (14.4)	66.3 (19.1)	70.1 (21.2)	69.0 (20.6)	62.1 (16.7)	50.8 (10.4)	40.1 (4.5)	31.2 (−0.4)	48.7 (9.3)
Mean daily minimum °F (°C)	17.0 (−8.3)	17.6 (−8.0)	24.4 (−4.2)	34.6 (1.4)	45.2 (7.3)	54.3 (12.4)	58.1 (14.5)	56.9 (13.8)	49.8 (9.9)	39.1 (3.9)	30.3 (−0.9)	23.1 (−4.9)	37.5 (3.1)
Mean minimum °F (°C)	−3.8 (−19.9)	−0.6 (−18.1)	4.8 (−15.1)	20.2 (−6.6)	29.2 (−1.6)	38.8 (3.8)	45.7 (7.6)	44.5 (6.9)	36.9 (2.7)	27.0 (−2.8)	15.8 (−9.0)	7.0 (−13.9)	−6.7 (−21.5)
Record low °F (°C)	−22 (−30)	−22 (−30)	−12 (−24)	11 (−12)	17 (−8)	28 (−2)	36 (2)	31 (−1)	22 (−6)	15 (−9)	−2 (−19)	−19 (−28)	−22 (−30)
Average precipitation inches (mm)	3.37 (86)	2.86 (73)	3.55 (90)	4.08 (104)	4.06 (103)	4.75 (121)	4.74 (120)	3.81 (97)	4.09 (104)	3.29 (84)	3.64 (92)	3.49 (89)	45.73 (1,163)
Average snowfall inches (cm)	12.4 (31)	5.1 (13)	5.9 (15)	0.3 (0.76)	0.0 (0.0)	0.0 (0.0)	0.0 (0.0)	0.0 (0.0)	0.0 (0.0)	0.0 (0.0)	1.7 (4.3)	9.1 (23)	34.5 (87.06)
Average extreme snow depth inches (cm)	6.9 (18)	6.4 (16)	4.6 (12)	0.2 (0.51)	0.0 (0.0)	0.0 (0.0)	0.0 (0.0)	0.0 (0.0)	0.0 (0.0)	0.0 (0.0)	1.3 (3.3)	3.5 (8.9)	9.7 (25)
Average precipitation days (≥ 0.01 in)	14.6	11.6	13.3	14.0	13.9	12.9	11.5	10.9	9.9	11.4	11.8	13.6	149.4
Average snowy days (≥ 0.1 in)	6.1	4.4	2.5	0.4	0.0	0.0	0.0	0.0	0.0	0.0	1.2	3.3	17.9
Source 1: NOAA
Source 2: National Weather Service

== Recreation ==
Pennsylvania State Game Lands Number 137 is located in the northern portion of Mahoning Township, just outside of South Bethlehem near Redbank Creek.

== Demographics ==
Historical population
Census	Pop.	Note	%±
2010	1,425		—
2020	1,406		−1.3%
2021 (est.)	1,393		−0.9%
U.S. Decennial Census

As of the 2000 census, there were 1,502 people, 607 households, and 449 families residing in the township. The population density was 60.5 inhabitants per square mile (23.4/km^{2}). There were 667 housing units at an average density of 26.8 per square mile (10.3/km^{2}). The racial makeup of the township was 99.20% White, 0.27% African American, 0.07% Native American, 0.07% Pacific Islander, and 0.40% from two or more races.

There were 607 households, out of which 30.1% had children under the age of 18 living with them, 63.8% were married couples living together, 6.4% had a female householder with no husband present, and 26.0% were non-families. 22.7% of all households were made up of individuals, and 12.0% had someone living alone who was 65 years of age or older. The average household size was 2.47 and the average family size was 2.90.

The township median age of 40 years was the same as the county median age of 40 years. The distribution by age group was 23.8% under the age of 18, 8.2% from 18 to 24, 25.4% from 25 to 44, 25.0% from 45 to 64, and 17.5% who were 65 years of age or older. The median age was 40 years. For every 100 females there were 97.1 males. For every 100 females age 18 and over, there were 94.2 males.

The median income for a household in the township was $29,934, and the median income for a family was $35,337. Males had a median income of $26,891 versus $16,813 for females. The per capita income for the township was $13,833. About 7.3% of families and 8.1% of the population were below the poverty line, including 12.2% of those under age 18 and 4.9% of those age 65 or over.

== Cemeteries ==
- Baptist Narrows Cemetery
- Colwell Cemetery
- Deanville Cemetery
- Mount Zion Cemetery
- Oakland Cemetery
- Putneyville Cemetery
- Smullin Cemetery
