= Bradys Bend Iron Company Furnaces =

- U.S. National Register of Historic Places
- Pennsylvania state historical marker
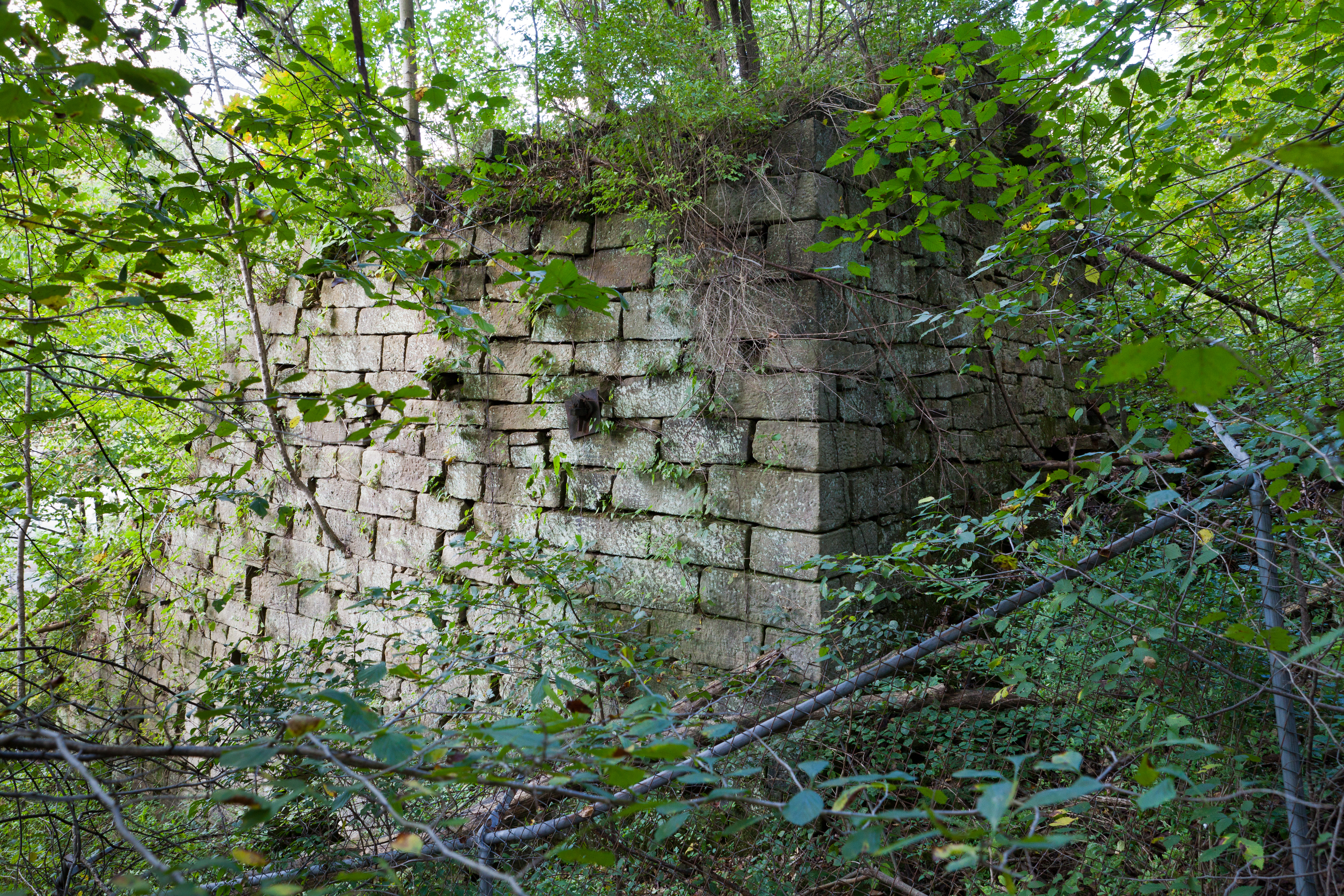

- Location within Pennsylvania Location within the United States
- Location: PA 68, Brady's Bend, Pennsylvania
- Coordinates: 40°59′55″N 79°37′34″W
- Area: 0.6 acres (0.24 ha)
- Built: 1839
- Built by: Great Western Iron Works
- NRHP reference No.: 80003407

Significant dates
- Added to NRHP: August 11, 1980
- Designated PHMC: November 28, 1946

Brady's Bend Iron Company Furnaces (also known as Brady's Bend Works) is a set of historic blast furnaces and rolling mill located in Brady's Bend Township, Armstrong County, Pennsylvania. The furnaces are constructed of stone, with the first blown into production in 1840. A second furnace was added in 1845. They were hot blast furnaces powered by a 250-horsepower steam engine. The rolling mill was also powered by a 250-horsepower steam engine and went into production in January 1842. The furnaces and mill were established by the Great Western Iron Works in August 1839, and is considered by some the "Pittsburgh of the Middle 1800s" and "Cradle of the Iron and Steel Industry in America." It was known as the Brady's Bend Iron Company after 1844. The company was credited with manufacturing the first T-rails west of the Allegheny Mountains. The works closed in 1873.

It was listed on the National Register of Historic Places in 1979.
