= Streams in Armstrong County, Pennsylvania =

List of streams and their coordinates

The following table lists all the named streams that flow in Armstrong County. For each stream, the name, coordinate of the source, name of the stream it flows into, coordinate of the confluence, and political subdivision in which the confluence is located are given.

Name	Source	Flows into	Mouth	Location
Allegheny River	41°52′22″N 77°52′30″W	Ohio River	40°26′36″N 80°00′54″W	Pittsburgh, Pennsylvania
Armstrong Run	41°01′06″N 79°38′18″W	Allegheny River	41°00′43″N 79°36′33″W	Perry Township
Beers Run	40°41′01″N 79°31′16″W	Crooked Creek	40°41′51″N 79°30′17″W	Burrell Township
Big Run	40°43′25″N 79°39′18″W	Allegheny River	40°40′52″N 79°40′11″W	South Buffalo Township
Birch Run	41°01′16″N 79°37′49″W	Allegheny River	41°02′00″N 79°37′09″W	Perry Township
Brady Run	40°40′04″N 79°34′39″W	Kiskiminetas River	40°37′57″N 79°36′33″W	Leechburg
Buffalo Creek	40°56′46″N 79°47′19″W	Allegheny River	40°40′11″N 79°41′34″W	Freeport
Bullock Run	40°54′42″N 79°25′44″W	North Fork Pine Creek	40°52′48″N 79°26′28″W	Boggs Township
Camp Run	40°53′40″N 79°17′33″W	Mahoning Creek	40°55′29″N 79°17′23″W	Wayne Township
Campbell Run	40°44′35″N 79°27′02″W	Crooked Creek	40°43′43″N 79°32′13″W	Manor Township
Carnahan Run	40°37′50″N 79°28′34″W	Kiskiminetas River	40°36′44″N 79°35′02″W	Parks Township
Cathcart Run	40°59′15″N 79°18′06″W	Mahoning Creek	40°57′25″N 79°18′45″W	Mahoning Township
Cave Run	40°55′43″N 79°22′24″W	Mahoning Creek	40°56′19″N 79°22′19″W	Mahoning Township
Cessna Run	40°46′20″N 79°19′32″W	South Branch Plum Creek	40°42′14″N 79°19′09″W	Plumcreek Township
Cherry Run	40°44′57″N 79°20′40″W	Crooked Creek	40°40′25″N 79°27′32″W	Burrell Township
Coal Bank Run	40°41′22″N 79°31′19″W	Crooked Creek	40°42′12″N 79°30′41″W	Bethel Township
Cornplanter Run	40°46′19″N 79°44′06″W	Buffalo Creek	40°45′16″N 79°40′21″W	South Buffalo Township
Cove Run	41°00′58″N 79°39′48″W	Sugar Creek	40°59′15″N 79°38′03″W	Bradys Bend Township
Cowanshannock Creek	40°49′34″N 79°10′32″W	Allegheny River	40°51′04″N 79°30′28″W	Gosford
Craig Run	40°36′12″N 79°22′30″W	Crooked Creek	40°38′08″N 79°24′00″W	South Bend Township
Craigs Run	40°49′40″N 79°18′30″W	Cowanshannock Creek	40°47′42″N 79°18′36″W	Rural Valley
Crooked Creek	40°41′44″N 79°04′43″W	Allegheny River	40°44′57″N 79°33′18″W	Bethel Township Manor Township
Deaver Run	40°52′12″N 79°23′59″W	South Fork Pine Creek	40°51′08″N 79°25′16″W	Boggs Township Valley Township
Dutch Run	40°42′29″N 79°14′39″W	Plum Creek	40°41′12″N 79°19′41″W	Plumcreek Township
Elbow Run	40°44′06″N 79°27′27″W	Crooked Creek	40°43′05″N 79°29′43″W	Kittaning Township
Elder Run	40°41′23″N 79°34′21″W	Kiskiminetas River	40°38′52″N 79°37′33″W	Gilpin Township
Fagley Run	40°41′04″N 79°22′48″W	Crooked Creek	40°39′07″N 79°25′24″W	Burrell Township
Flat Run	40°34′06″N 79°28′16″W	Kiskiminetas River	40°32′10″N 79°30′17″W	Kiskiminetas Township
Foundry Run	40°55′55″N 79°11′20″W	Mahoning Creek	40°54′37″N 79°13′15″W	Wayne Township
Garretts Run	40°45′32″N 79°27′22″W	Allegheny River	40°47′40″N 79°31′02″W	Manor Township
Glade Run	40°50′42″N 79°12′23″W	Mahoning Creek	40°54′53″N 79°15′47″W	Wayne Township
Glade Run	40°54′17″N 79°34′24″W	Allegheny River	40°45′08″N 79°34′06″W	Cadogan Township
Gobblers Run	40°37′11″N 79°18′39″W	Crooked Creek	40°38′03″N 79°21′37″W	South Bend Township
Guffy Run	40°40′46″N 79°33′25″W	Kiskiminetas River	40°37′59″N 79°34′54″W	Gilpin Township Parks Township
Hamilton Run	40°58′46″N 79°19′44″W	Mahoning Creek	40°57′00″N 79°19′16″W	Mahoning Township near Putneyville
Hart Run	40°57′00″N 79°38′30″W	Sugar Creek	40°59′16″N 79°37′57″W	Bradys Bend Township
Hays Run	40°50′29″N 79°26′33″W	Allegheny River	40°51′44″N 79°28′59″W	Rayburn Township
Hill Run	40°43′44″N 79°37′55″W	Allegheny River	40°41′41″N 79°37′15″W	South Buffalo Township
Holder Run	40°57′43″N 79°40′30″W	Sugar Creek	40°59′10″N 79°38′16″W	Bradys Bend Township
Horney Camp Run	40°43′43″N 79°27′09″W	Crooked Creek	40°42′30″N 79°29′59″W	Burrell Township
Huling Run	40°54′47″N 79°35′17″W	Allegheny River	40°59′01″N 79°34′32″W	Washington Township
Huskins Run	40°45′16″N 79°20′40″W	Cowanshannock Creek	40°47′54″N 79°22′14″W	Cowanshannock Township
Knapp Run	40°43′39″N 79°38′14″W	Allegheny River	40°41′44″N 79°38′46″W	South Buffalo Township
Kiskiminetas River	40°29′08″N 79°27′14″W	Allegheny River	40°40′46″N 79°40′01″W	near Freeport, Pennsylvania
Laurel Run	40°50′03″N 79°23′05″W	South Fork Pine Creek	40°50′40″N 79°23′58″W	Boggs Township Valley Township
Limestone Run	40°54′58″N 79°33′10″W	Allegheny River	40°51′21″N 79°30′28″W	East Franklin Township
Lindsay Run	40°36′35″N 79°24′02″W	Crooked Creek	40°38′05″N 79°24′07″W	South Bend Township
Little Mudlick Creek	40°59′52″N 79°15′25″W	Mahoning Creek	40°57′10″N 79°18′09″W	Redbank Township
Little Sandy Creek	41°01′39″N 78°57′31″W	Redbank Creek	41°02′44″N 79°13′48″W	Redbank Township
Long Run	40°35′52″N 79°25′26″W	Kiskiminetas River	40°32′00″N 79°28′34″W	Kiskiminetas Township
Long Run	40°40′28″N 79°24′38″W	Fagley Run	40°39′14″N 79°25′14″W	South Bend Township
Long Run	40°54′31″N 79°35′33″W	Patterson Creek	40°52′03″N 79°38′15″W	West Franklin Township
Long Run	40°59′39″N 79°41′54″W	Sugar Creek	40°58′49″N 79°40′24″W	Bradys Bend Township
Long Run	40°49′39″N 79°23′15″W	Cowanshannock Creek	40°48′34″N 79°24′40″W	Valley Township
Mahoning Creek	40°58′26″N 78°51′22″W	Allegheny River	40°55′59″N 79°27′40″W	Madison Township and Pine Township
Marrowbone Run	40°46′50″N 79°37′15″W	Buffalo Creek	40°47′37″N 79°39′06″W	North Buffalo Township
Mast Run	40°57′47″N 79°31′07″W	Allegheny River	40°56′49″N 79°32′39″W	Madison Township
Mill Run	40°45′57″N 79°23′30″W	Cowanshannock Creek	40°48′29″N 79°27′47″W	Rayburn Township
Mudlick Creek	41°01′14″N 79°13′25″W	Pine Run	40°57′45″N 79°15′09″W	Redbank Township
Nicholson Run	40°47′09″N 79°36′19″W	Allegheny River	40°43′34″N 79°35′13″W	South Buffalo Township
Nolf Run	41°00′11″N 79°12′24″W	Little Sandy Creek	41°02′21″N 79°13′06″W	Redbank Township
North Branch Cherry Run	40°45′21″N 79°26′53″W	Cherry Run	40°41′08″N 79°25′33″W	Burrell Township
North Branch Plum Creek	40°49′33″N 79°10′02″W	Keystone Lake	40°43′13″N 79°18′09″W	Plumcreek Township
North Branch South Fork Pine Creek	40°51′03″N 79°15′52″W	South Fork Pine Creek	40°50′58″N 79°19′43″W	Wayne Township near Echo.
North Fork Pine Creek	40°53′26″N 79°19′48″W	Pine Creek	40°52′27″N 79°28′06″W	Boggs Township
Nye Branch	40°56′37″N 79°09′29″W	Sugarcamp Run	40°57′45″N 79°13′17″W	Redbank Township
Patterson Creek	40°57′11″N 79°40′51″W	Buffalo Creek	40°51′06″N 79°38′17″W	West Franklin Township
Pine Creek	40°52′27″N 79°28′08″W	Allegheny River	40°52′16″N 79°28′41″W	Boggs Township Rayburn Township
Pine Run	40°43′04″N 79°26′45″W	Crooked Creek	40°41′15″N 79°28′28″W	Burrell Township
Pine Run	41°00′57″N 79°40′32″W	Sugar Creek	40°59′10″N 79°39′15″W	Bradys Bend Township
Pine Run	40°46′33″N 79°37′33″W	Buffalo Creek	40°43′59″N 79°40′46″W	South Buffalo Township
Pine Run	40°58′10″N 79°06′29″W	Mahoning Creek	40°56′47″N 79°16′39″W	Redbank Township
Plum Creek	40°43′14″N 79°18′09″W	Crooked Creek	40°39′56″N 79°19′45″W	Plumcreek Township
Rattling Run	40°36′40″N 79°30′30″W	Roaring Run	40°33′39″N 79°31′38″W	Kiskiminetas Township
Redbank Creek	41°09′30″N 79°04′36″W	Allegheny River	40°58′55″N 79°33′00″W	Madison Township
Roaring Run	40°36′18″N 79°26′27″W	Kiskiminetas River	40°33′04″N 79°32′10″W	Kiskiminetas Township
Rough Run	40°49′13″N 79°48′14″W	Buffalo Creek	40°47′05″N 79°41′16″W	North Buffalo Township
Rupp Run	40°46′25″N 79°26′39″W	Garretts Run	40°47′03″N 79°29′42″W	Manor Township
Scrubgrass Creek	40°54′45″N 79°19′29″W	Mahoning Creek	40°55′33″N 79°25′26″W	Mahoning Station, Pine Township
Sipes Run	40°47′09″N 79°40′28″W	Buffalo Creek	40°46′09″N 79°40′22″W	South Buffalo Township
Snyders Run	40°56′28″N 79°35′48″W	Allegheny River	40°58′12″N 79°35′22″W	Bradys Bend Township
South Branch Cowanshannock Creek	40°49′15″N 79°10′40″W	Cowanshannock Creek	40°47′51″N 79°15′55″W	Cowanshannock Township
South Branch Plum Creek	40°47′13″N 79°04′34″W	Plum Creek	40°43′13″N 79°18′09″W	Plumcreek Township
South Branch South Fork Pine Creek	40°49′13″N 79°16′33″W	South Fork Pine Creek	40°50′58″N 79°19′43″W	Wayne Township
South Fork Pine Creek	40°50′58″N 79°19′42″W	Pine Creek	40°52′27″N 79°28′06″W	Rayburn Township
Spra Run	40°45′54″N 79°23′04″W	Cowanshannock Creek	40°48′39″N 79°25′08″W	Valley Township
Spruce Run	40°51′03″N 79°14′26″W	Cowanshannock Creek	40°49′01″N 79°14′41″W	Cowanshannock Township
Spur Run	40°40′55″N 79°33′17″W	Taylor Run	40°42′08″N 79°33′22″W	Bethel Township
Sugar Creek	40°58′11″N 79°42′33″W	Allegheny River	40°59′31″N 79°36′49″W	Bradys Bend Township
Sugar Run	40°40′39″N 79°22′39″W	Crooked Creek	40°38′15″N 79°24′18″W	South Bend Township
Sugarcamp Run	40°59′40″N 79°13′05″W	Mudlick Creek	40°57′43″N 79°14′13″W	Redbank Township
Taylor Run	40°40′37″N 79°31′38″W	Allegheny River	40°42′28″N 79°34′49″W	Bethel Township
Tub Mill Run	40°45′43″N 79°30′36″W	Allegheny River	40°45′23″N 79°32′50″W	Manor Township
Watson Run	40°43′24″N 79°37′22″W	Allegheny River	40°42′07″N 79°36′19″W	South Buffalo Township
Whiskey Run	41°00′52″N 79°38′28″W	Sugar Creek	40°59′57″N 79°37′28″W	Bradys Bend Township
Wiskey Creek	40°55′06″N 79°26′06″W	Allegheny River	40°55′12″N 79°27′48″W	Pine Township
