= Pennsylvania Route 128 =

State highway in Armstrong County, Pennsylvania, US

Pennsylvania Route 128

Route information
- Maintained by PennDOT
- Length: 15.746 mi (25.341 km)

Major junctions
- South end: PA 356 in Freeport
- North end: PA 66 in Ford City

Location
- Country: United States
- State: Pennsylvania
- Counties: Armstrong

Highway system
- Pennsylvania State Route System; Interstate; US; State; Scenic; Legislative
← PA 127	→ PA 129

Pennsylvania Route 128 (PA 128) is a 15.8-mile-long (25.4 km) state highway located in Armstrong County, Pennsylvania. The southern terminus is at PA 356 in Freeport. The northern terminus is at PA 66 in Ford City.

== Route description ==
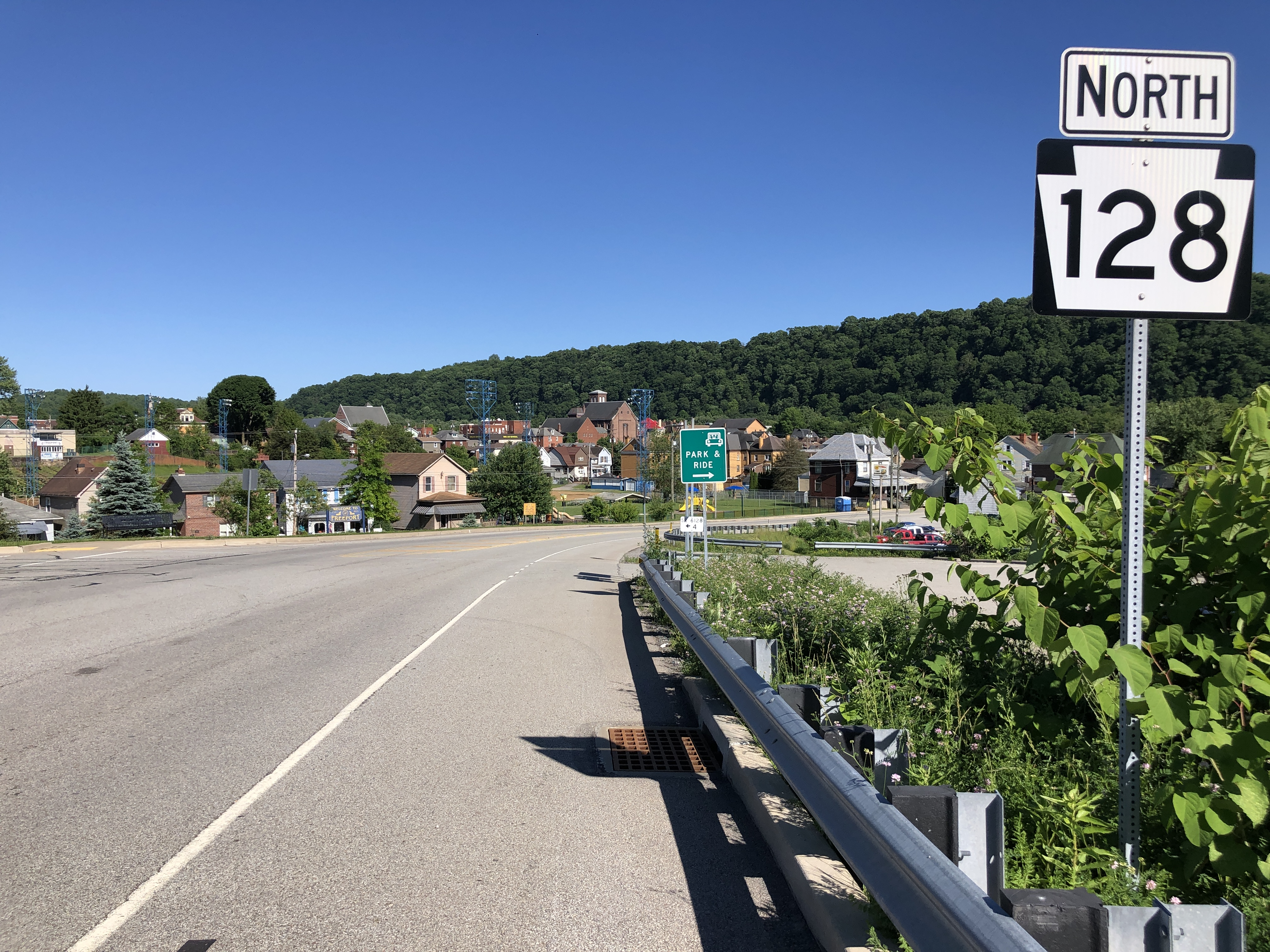
PA 128 northbound in Freeport

PA 128 begins at a T-intersection in the borough of Freeport with PA 356 just west of Buffalo Creek and just east of the Butler County line. The route heads east over the creek on a bridge and curves to the south onto 2nd Street. It then heads east on Market Street passing through Freeport's central business district. At 5th Street, PA 128 heads north along it for one block coming to a traffic signal at High Street. PA 128 turns and heads east on two-lane undivided High Street, lined with residences. The road turns northeast and crosses into South Buffalo Township, entering wooded areas as it becomes Freeport Road. PA 128 continues north and skirts the border between Freeport to the west and South Buffalo Township to the east as a three-lane road with two northbound lanes and one southbound lane. The road passes through woodland with some homes within South Buffalo Township, running through the community of Dock Hollow. Farther north, the route enters a mix of farmland, woods, and residences as it heads more to the northeast and passes through Kerr. At this point, PA 128 curves to the north and continues to an interchange with the PA 28 freeway.

A short distance past this interchange, the route reaches Slate Lick and turns east onto Cadogan Slate Lick Road, passing through more rural areas with some residences. The road crosses into North Buffalo Township and passes under the PA 28 freeway without an interchange. PA 128 continues east before turning south into forested areas and entering Cadogan Township. The route becomes Main Street and heads into the community of Cadogan, passing homes. PA 128 turns northeast onto Prospect Avenue and passes more residences before crossing back into North Buffalo Township and becoming Ford City Road. The road heads through woods before coming into areas of fields and homes. The route turns southeast and comes to the Ford City Veterans Bridge over the Buffalo and Pittsburgh Railroad and the Allegheny River, entering Manor Township. PA 128 curves northeast and heads into the borough of Ford City, becoming 5th Avenue as it passes numerous homes. The road runs through the commercial downtown of Ford City before continuing past more residences and businesses. PA 128 crosses back into Manor Township and comes to its northern terminus at an intersection with PA 66.

== Major intersections ==
The entire route is in Armstrong County.

Location	mi	km	Destinations	Notes
Freeport	0.000	0.000	PA 356 (Butler Road) – Natrona Heights, Leechburg, Kittanning, Butler	Southern terminus
South Buffalo Township	7.413– 7.272	11.930– 11.703	PA 28 – Kittanning, Freeport	Exit 18 (PA 28)
Allegheny River	13.691– 13.894	22.034– 22.360	Ford City Veterans Bridge	
Manor Township	15.746	25.341	PA 66 – Kittanning, Leechburg	Northern terminus
1.000 mi = 1.609 km; 1.000 km = 0.621 mi
