= Cowanshannock =

Cowanshannock may refer to the following in the United States:

Places

- Cowanshannock Township, Armstrong County, Pennsylvania
- Cowanshannock, Pennsylvania

Streams

- Cowanshannock Creek, a tributary of the Allegheny River
- South Branch Cowanshannock Creek, a tributary of the above
