= Ross Island (Pennsylvania) =

Coordinates: 40°44′57″N 79°33′48″W

Ross Island is an alluvial island in the Allegheny River in Manor Township, Armstrong County, in the U.S. state of Pennsylvania. The island is situated across from Cadogan and North Buffalo townships.

The elevation of Ross Island is 768 feet above sea level.
