= Ford City Veterans Bridge =

- Coordinates: 40°46′N 79°32′W
- Carries: Two lanes of PA 128
- Crosses: Allegheny River
- Locale: Ford City and North Buffalo Township

Characteristics
- Design: Girder bridge
- Total length: 1069 feet
- Width: 39 ft
- Clearance below: 96 ft

History
- Opened: 2000

The Ford City Veterans Bridge is a girder bridge connecting Ford City and North Buffalo Township, Pennsylvania. It was constructed in 2000 to replace a 1914 structure. The structure was one of the first in the nation to use a new type of high-performance, weather resistant steel.

== See also ==
- List of crossings of the Allegheny River
