= Judge J. Frank Graff Bridge =

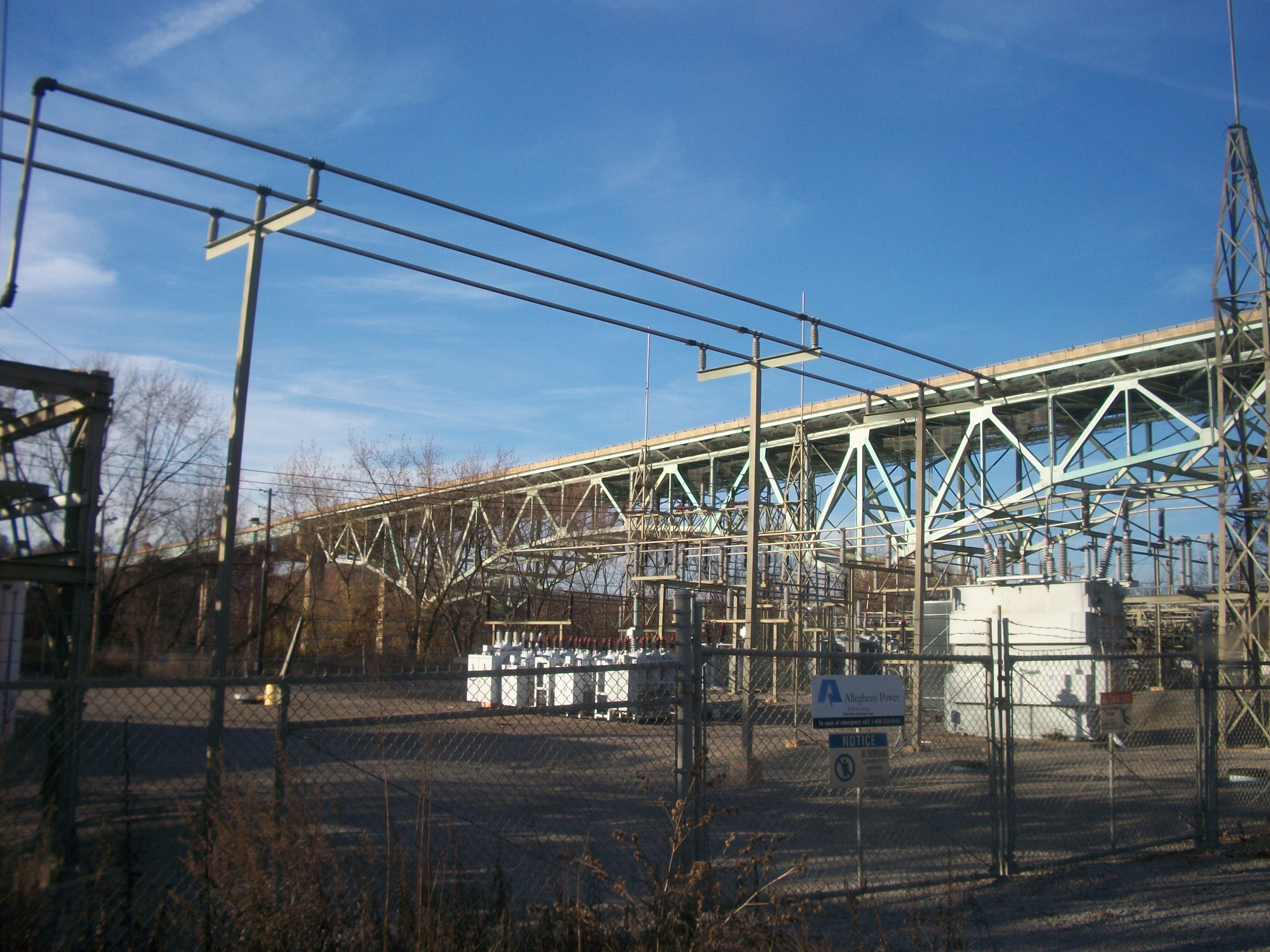
- Coordinates: 40°47′47″N 79°31′06″W
- Carries: Four lanes of US 422 / PA 28
- Crosses: Allegheny River
- Locale: Manor Township and North Buffalo Township

Characteristics
- Design: Truss bridge
- Total length: 2701 ft

History
- Opened: 1974

The Judge J. Frank Graff Bridge is an American truss bridge that carries U.S. Route 422 (US 422) and Pennsylvania Route 28 (PA 28) across the Allegheny River. It was named in honor of Frank Graff, an Armstrong County Court of Common Pleas Judge who later rose to become a member of the Pennsylvania Superior Court.

== History and architectural features ==
This bridge connects Manor Township and North Buffalo Township, Pennsylvania. Construction began on the bridge in 1974 as part of a freeway bypass of Kittanning, Pennsylvania, and continued through the late 1970s. The structure was named for Frank Graff, an Armstrong County Court of Common Pleas Judge who later rose to become a member of the Pennsylvania Superior Court.

Forrest Wright, a local Pennsylvania Department of Transportation worker from Ford City, Pennsylvania, was the first person to ever cross the Graff bridge after its completion.

== See also ==
- List of crossings of the Allegheny River
