= Cadogan, Pennsylvania =

Unincorporated community in Pennsylvania, US

- Unincorporated community
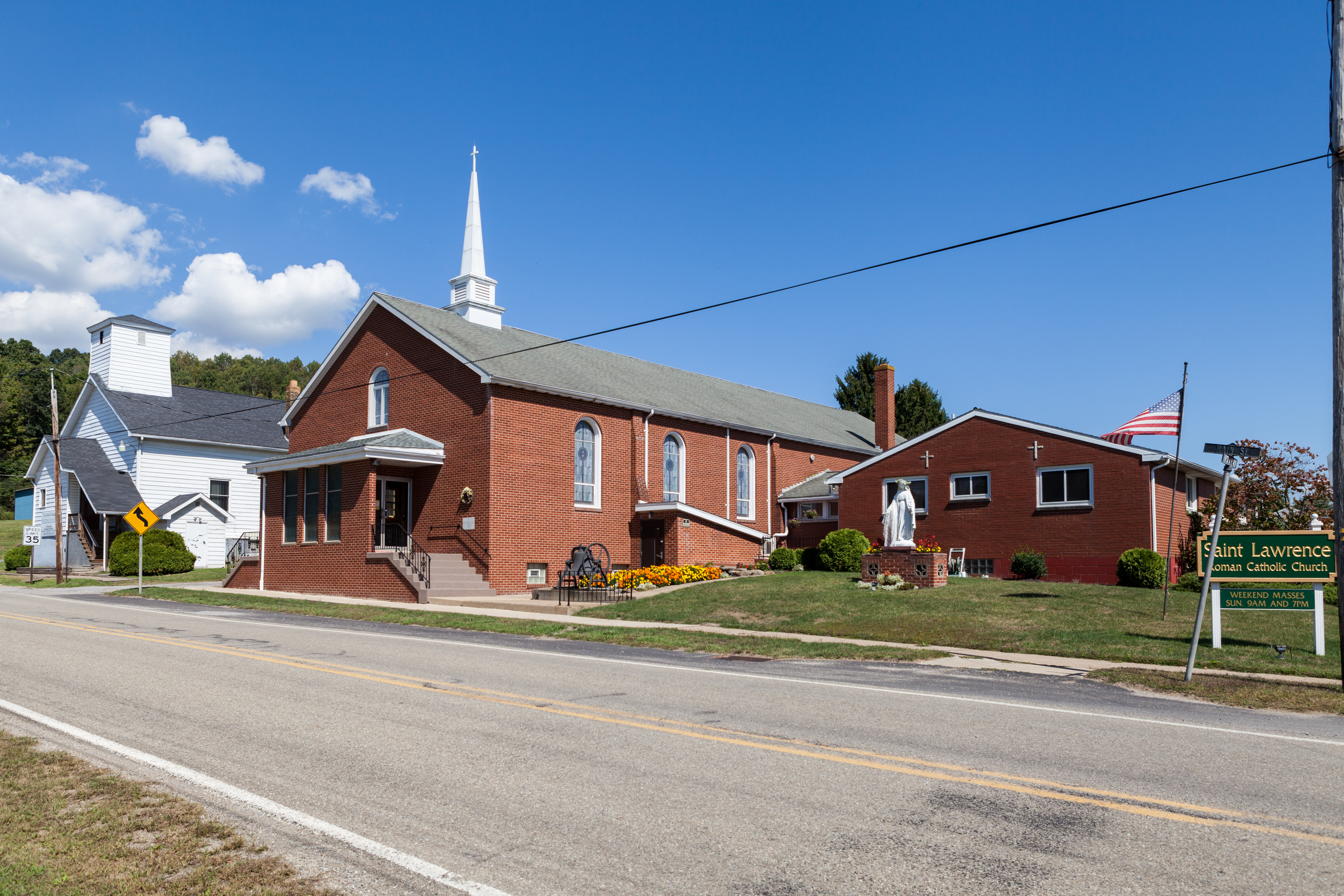
- Saint Lawrence Church, Cadogan

- Location within Pennsylvania
- Coordinates: 40°45′14″N 79°34′52″W
- Country: United States
- State: Pennsylvania
- County: Armstrong
- Township: Cadogan
- Elevation: 899 ft (274 m)
- Time zone: UTC-5 (Eastern (EST))
  - Summer (DST): UTC-4 (EDT)
- ZIP code: 16212
- Area code: 724
- GNIS feature ID: 1198314

Cadogan is an unincorporated community in Cadogan Township, Armstrong County, Pennsylvania, United States. The community is located along the Allegheny River and Pennsylvania Route 128, 5.3 miles (8.5 km) southwest of Kittanning. Cadogan has a post office with ZIP code 16212.
