= Manor Township, Pennsylvania =

Manor Township is the name of some places in the U.S. state of Pennsylvania:

- Manor Township, Armstrong County, Pennsylvania
- Manor Township, Lancaster County, Pennsylvania
