= Burrell Township, Pennsylvania =

Burrell Township may mean:

- Burrell Township, Armstrong County, Pennsylvania
- Burrell Township, Indiana County, Pennsylvania

== See also ==
- Upper Burrell Township, Pennsylvania
- Lower Burrell, Pennsylvania
