= Gosford, Pennsylvania =

- Unincorporated community
- Location within Pennsylvania
- Coordinates: 40°50′59″N 79°30′36″W
- Country: United States
- State: Pennsylvania
- County: Armstrong
- Township: Rayburn
- Elevation: 827 ft (252 m)
- Time zone: UTC-5 (Eastern (EST))
  - Summer (DST): UTC-4 (EDT)
- GNIS feature ID: 1192528

Gosford is an unincorporated community in Rayburn Township, Armstrong County, Pennsylvania, United States. The community is situated approximately 3 miles (4.8 km) northeast of Kittanning at the place where Cowanshannock Creek joins the Allegheny River.

== History ==
Gosford had a post office that operated from 1879 to 1905.
