= Dorothy Kovalchick =

American baseball player (1925–2020)

- Centerfielder / Third base
- Born: December 31, 1925; Sagamore, Pennsylvania, U.S.
- Died: June 10, 2020 (aged 94); West Monroe, Louisiana, U.S.
- Batted: Right Threw: Right

Teams
- Fort Wayne Daisies (1945)

Career highlights and awards
- Women in Baseball – AAGPBL Permanent Display at the Baseball Hall of Fame and Museum (since 1988)

Dorothy Kovalchick (later Roark; December 31, 1925 – June 10, 2020) was an American All-American Girls Professional Baseball League player. Kovalchick batted and threw right handed. She was born in Sagamore, Armstrong County, Pennsylvania, the daughter of John and Anna (née Lucas) Kovalchick.

According to All-American Girls Professional Baseball League data, Kovalchick made appearances at center field and third base for the Fort Wayne Daisies club during its 1945 inaugural season. After her baseball career ended, she moved to West Monroe, Louisiana, where she began a new career in real estate, opening Century 21–Dorothy Roark.

Predeceased by her husband, Earl Christopher Roark, Dorothy died on June 10, 2020, aged 94.

The All-American Girls Professional Baseball League folded in 1954, but there is now a permanent display at the Baseball Hall of Fame and Museum at Cooperstown, New York, since November 5, 1988, that honors those who were part of this unique experience. Kovalchick is included at the display/exhibit.
