= Barnard, Pennsylvania =

Coordinates: 40.8259°N 79.2297°W

Barnard is a historic community located in Cowanshannock Township, Armstrong County, Pennsylvania. It is located at 40.8253427 -79.2297604. It operated a U.S. Post Office from 1861 to 1905. Its elevation is 1,184 feet. Barnards P.O. appears in the 1876 Atlas of Armstrong County, Pennsylvania.

== Sources ==
- Platt, William G. (1879). Report of Progress in Armstrong County. Harrisburg, PA
- Pennsylvania Geological Survey, 2nd series, H5, lxvill, 388 p. geol map. scale 1 in.=2 mi.
