= Sagamore, Armstrong County, Pennsylvania =

Unincorporated community in Pennsylvania, US

Sagamore, Pennsylvania
- Unincorporated community
- Location within Pennsylvania
- Coordinates: 40°46′48″N 79°13′40″W
- Country: United States
- State: Pennsylvania
- County: Armstrong
- Township: Cowanshannock
- Elevation: 1,132 ft (345 m)
- Time zone: UTC-5 (Eastern (EST))
  - Summer (DST): UTC-4 (EDT)
- ZIP code: 16250
- Area code: 724
- GNIS feature ID: 1185717

Sagamore is an unincorporated community in Armstrong County, Pennsylvania, United States. Its ZIP code is 16250.

== Demographics ==
Historical population
Census	Pop.	Note	%±

The United States Census Bureau defined Sagamore as a census designated place (CDP) in 2023.

== Notable person ==
Dorothy Kovalchick (1925-2020), baseball player, was born in Sagamore.
