= Valley Township, Armstrong County, Pennsylvania =

Township in Pennsylvania, US

Coordinates: 40°49′27″N 79°24′57″W

- Township
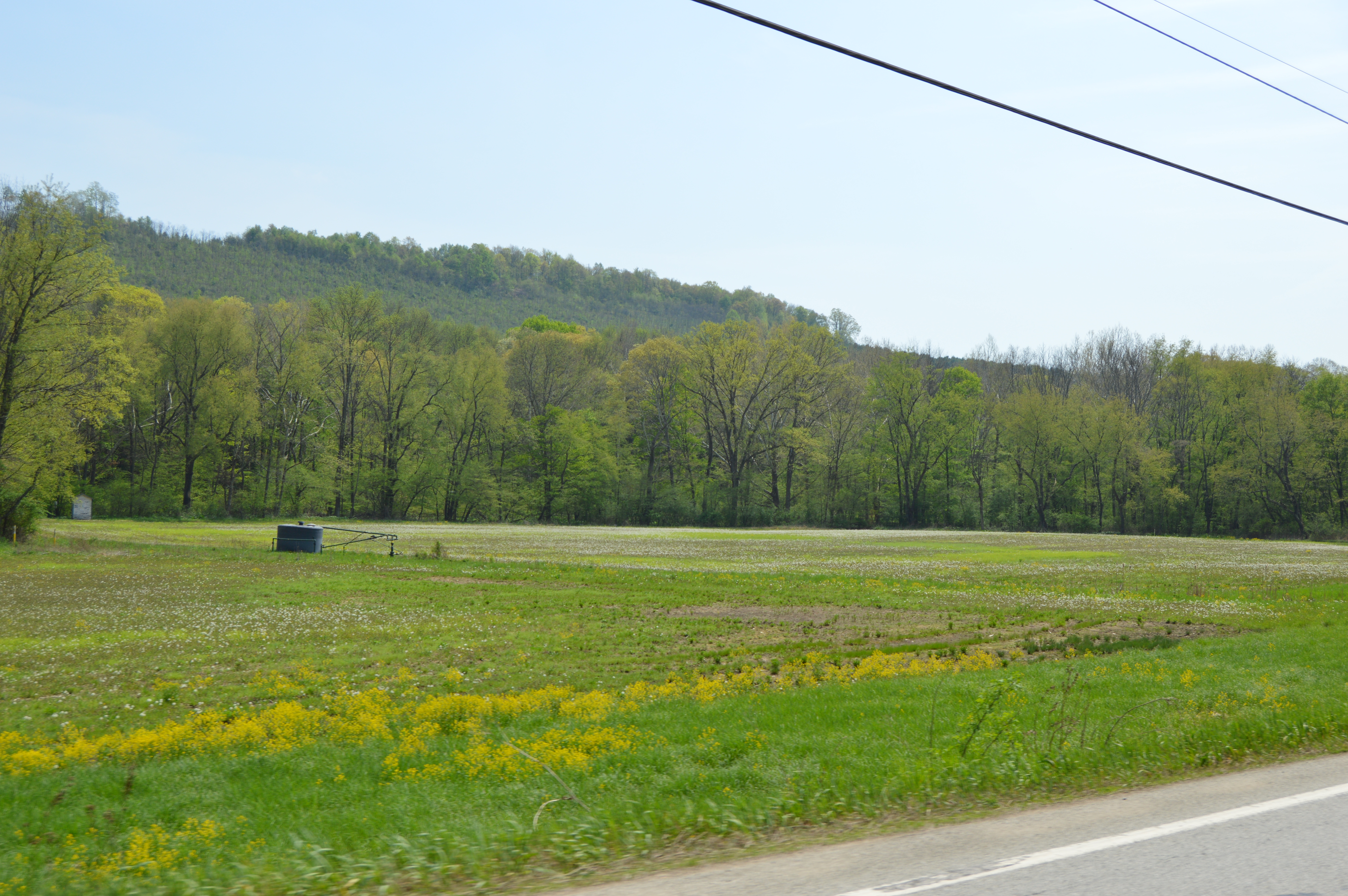
- Cowanshannock Creek floodplain

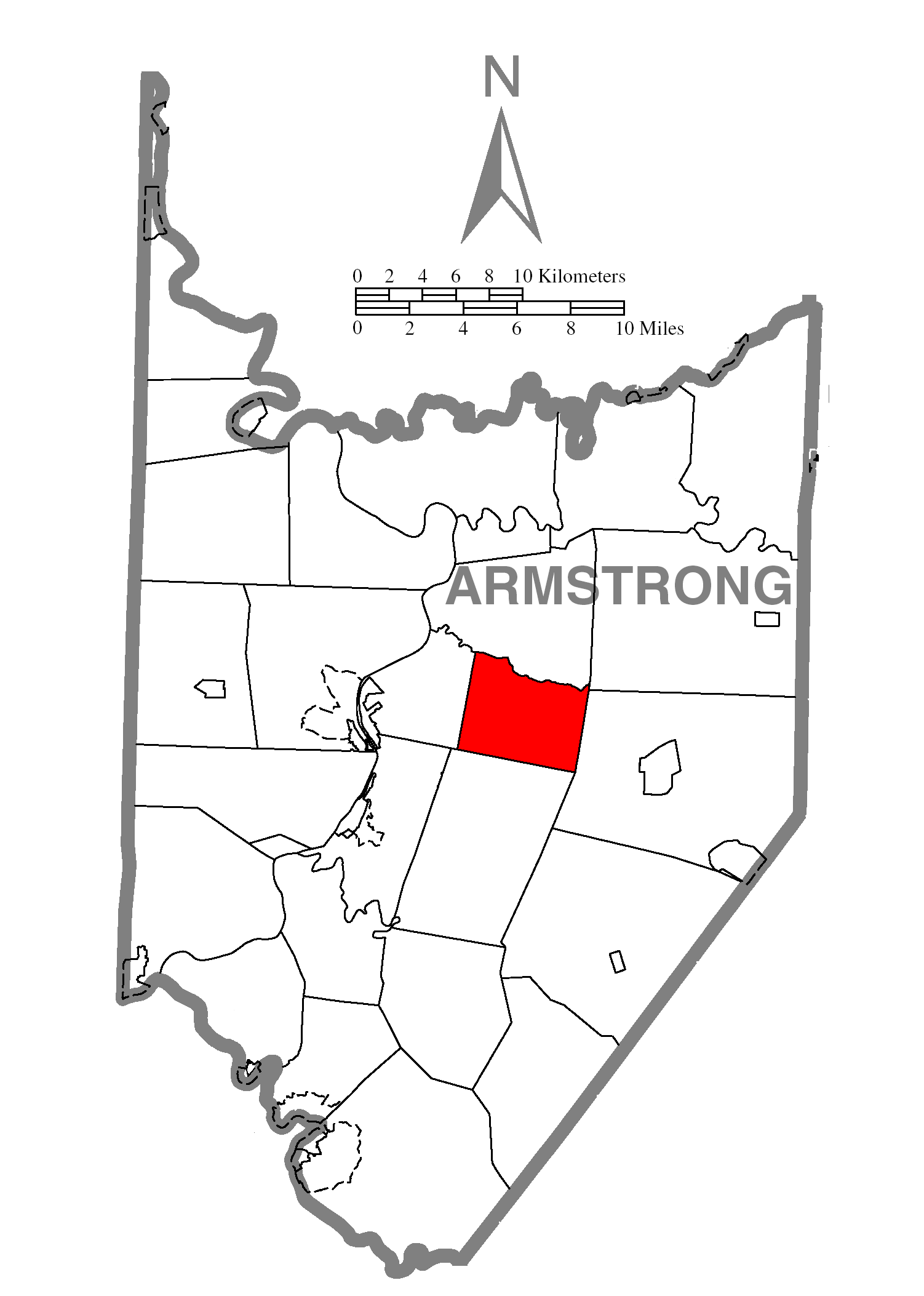
- Map of Armstrong County, Pennsylvania, highlighting Valley Township

- Map of Armstrong County, Pennsylvania
- Country: United States
- State: Pennsylvania
- County: Armstrong
- Settled: 1807
- Incorporated: 1855

Area
  - Total: 14.75 sq mi (38.19 km^{2})
  - Land: 14.75 sq mi (38.19 km^{2})
  - Water: 0 sq mi (0.00 km^{2})

Population (2020)
  - Total: 654
  - Estimate (2021): 649
  - Density: 43.3/sq mi (16.73/km^{2})
- Time zone: UTC-5 (Eastern (EST))
  - Summer (DST): UTC-4 (EDT)
- FIPS code: 42-005-79528

Valley Township is a township that is located in Armstrong County, Pennsylvania, United States. The population was 654 at the time of the 2020 census, a decrease from the figure of 656 that was tabulated in 2010.

== History ==
Valley Township was formed in 1855, following the petition of residents requesting that Pine Township be split in two pieces. It was originally proposed that it be named Buffington Township after a local judge, but he declined, and suggested naming it for any living person be avoided. It was named instead for the valley of the Cowanshannock Creek.

A post office called Oscar was established on July 25, 1861, with Francis Martin as its postmaster. It remained in operation until 1886.

=== Cemeteries ===
- Mount Union Davis Cemetery
- Pine Creek Methodist Cemetery

== Geography ==
Valley Township is located in central Armstrong County. Cowanshannock Creek, a tributary of the Allegheny River, flows through the southern part of the township.

The largest settlement is the unincorporated community of West Valley.

According to the United States Census Bureau, the township has a total area of 14.7 square miles (38.2 km^{2}), all land.

== Demographics ==
Historical population
Census	Pop.	Note	%±
2010	656		—
2020	654		−0.3%
2021 (est.)	649		−0.8%
U.S. Decennial Census

As of the 2000 census, there were 681 people, 262 households, and 210 families residing in the township.

The population density was 46.2 inhabitants per square mile (17.8/km^{2}). There were 298 housing units at an average density of 20.2/sq mi (7.8/km^{2}).

The racial makeup of the township was 98.97% White, 0.15% African American, 0.15% Native American, 0.44% Asian, and 0.29% from two or more races.

There were 262 households, out of which 33.2% had children under the age of eighteen living with them; 67.9% were married couples living together, 8.0% had a female householder with no husband present, and 19.8% were non-families. Individuals made up 17.2% of residents who were documented as living in one-person residencies; 8.4% had someone living alone who was sixty-five years of age or older.

The average household size was 2.60 and the average family size was 2.91.

The township median age of 39 years was slightly less than the county median age of 40 years. The distribution by age group was 23.5% of residents who were under the age of 18, 8.1% from 18 to 24, 27.8% from 25 to 44, 26.9% from 45 to 64, and 13.8% who were 65 years of age or older.

For every 100 females there were 102.1 males. For every 100 females age 18 and over, there were 98.9 males.

The median income for a household in the township was $40,000, and the median income for a family was $46,071. Males had a median income of $29,444 compared with that of $20,250 for females.

The per capita income for the township was $16,664.

Approximately 6.9% of families and 7.2% of the population were living below the poverty line, including 7.1% of those who were under the age of eighteen and 5.2% of those who were aged sixty-five or older.
