= Rayburn Township, Pennsylvania =

Township in Pennsylvania, US

Coordinates: 40°50′45″N 79°29′23″W

- Township
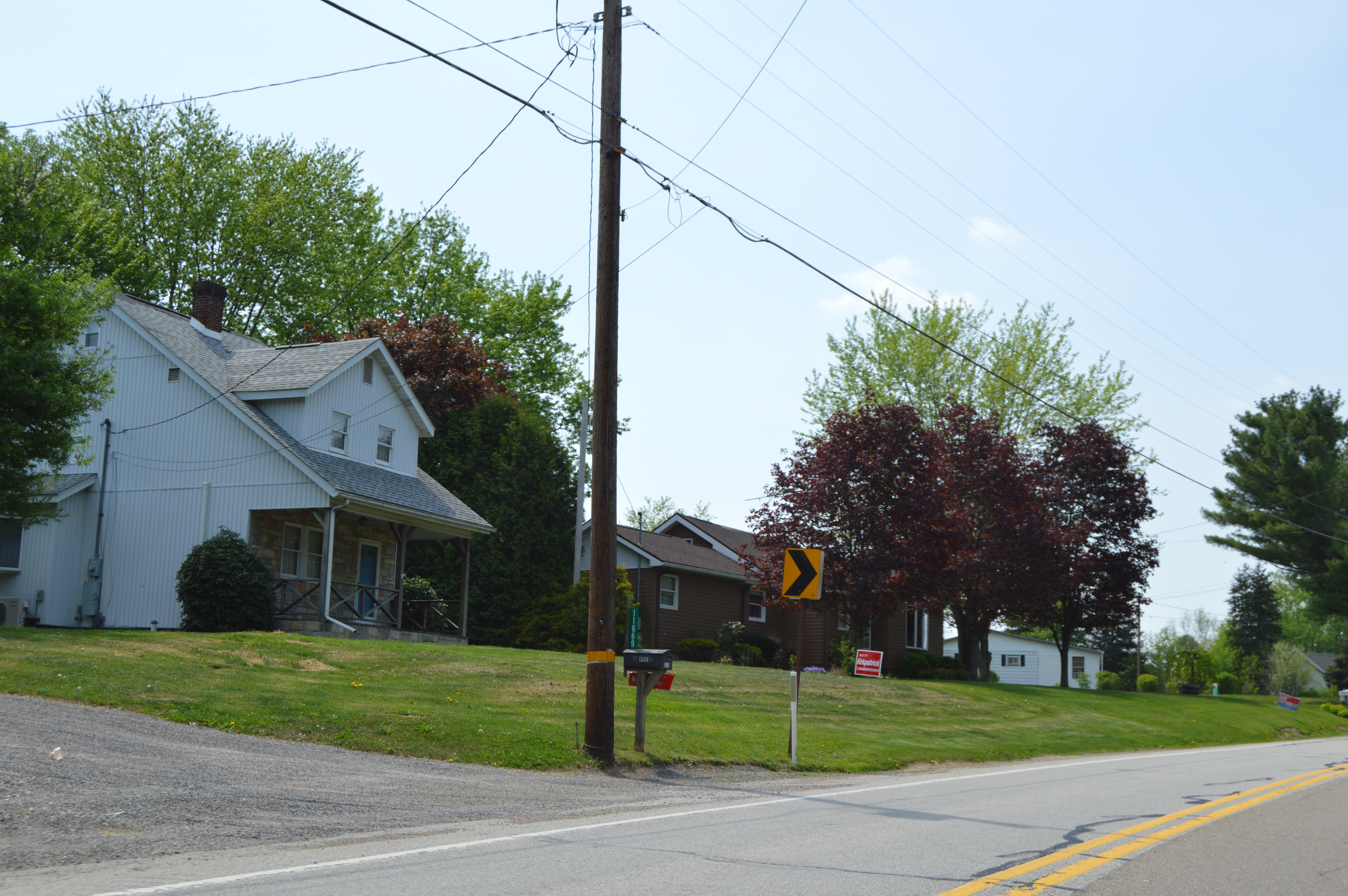
- Along Pennsylvania Route 85 at Sunnyside

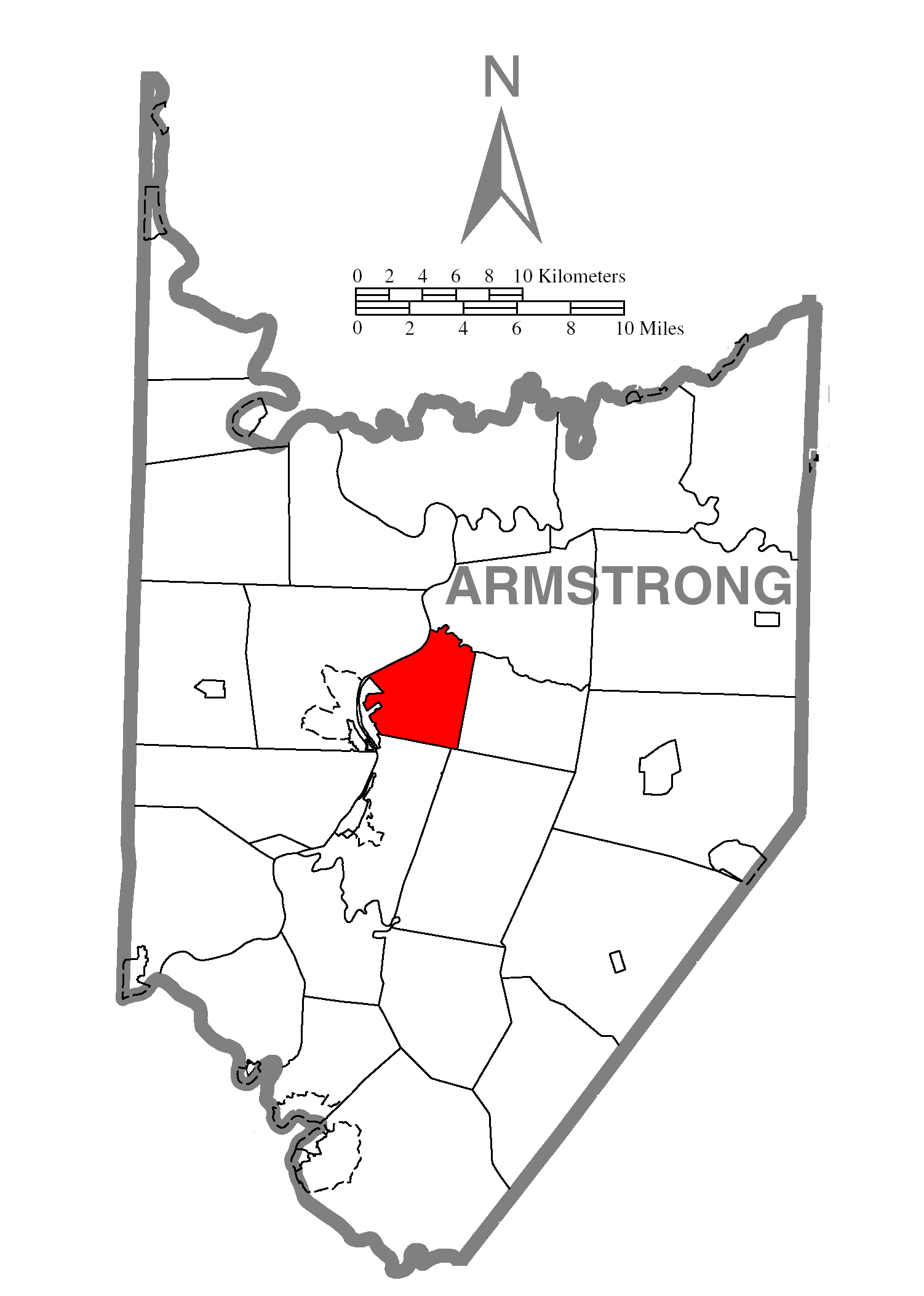
- Map of Armstrong County, Pennsylvania, highlighting Rayburn Township

- Map of Armstrong County, Pennsylvania
- Country: United States
- State: Pennsylvania
- County: Armstrong
- Settled: 1784
- Incorporated: 1890

Area
  - Total: 12.10 sq mi (31.33 km^{2})
  - Land: 11.85 sq mi (30.69 km^{2})
  - Water: 0.25 sq mi (0.64 km^{2})

Population (2020)
  - Total: 1,766
  - Estimate (2021): 1,756
  - Density: 153.7/sq mi (59.34/km^{2})
- Time zone: UTC-5 (Eastern (EST))
  - Summer (DST): UTC-4 (EDT)
- FIPS code: 42-005-63560

Rayburn Township is a township that is located in Armstrong County, Pennsylvania, United States. The population was 1,766 at the time of the 2020 census, a decrease from the figure of 1,907 that was tabulated in 2010.

== Geography ==
Rayburn Township is located in central Armstrong County and is bordered to the west by the Allegheny River and the borough of Kittanning, the county seat. Cowanshannock Creek flows through the township into the Allegheny River.

According to the United States Census Bureau, the township has a total area of 12.1 square miles (31.3 km^{2}), of which 11.9 square miles (30.7 km^{2}) is land and 0.23 square miles (0.6 km^{2}), or 2.04%, is water.

== Demographics ==
Historical population
Census	Pop.	Note	%±
2010	1,907		—
2020	1,766		−7.4%
2021 (est.)	1,756		−0.6%
U.S. Decennial Census

As of the 2000 census, there were 1,811 people, 694 households, and 526 families residing in the township.

The population density was 152.4 inhabitants per square mile (58.8/km^{2}). There were 737 housing units at an average density of 62.0 per square mile (23.9/km^{2}).

The racial makeup of the township was 99.06% White, 0.33% African American, 0.28% from other races, and 0.33% from two or more races. Hispanic or Latino of any race were 0.61% of the population.

There were 694 households, out of which 36.5% had children who were under the age of eighteen living with them, 64.8% were married couples living together, 8.1% had a female householder with no husband present, and 24.2% were non-families. 20.3% of all households were made up of individuals, and 10.7% had someone living alone who was sixty-five years of age or older.

The average household size was 2.57 and the average family size was 2.97.

The township median age of thirty-eight years was less than that of the county median age of forty years. The distribution by age group was 25.7% of residents who were under the age of eighteen, 6.9% who were aged eighteen to twenty-four, 28.5% who were aged twenty-five to forty-four, 24.0% who were aged forty-five to sixty-four, and 14.8% who were sixty-five years of age or older. The median age was thirty-eight years.

For every one hundred females, there were 96.2 males. For every one hundred females who were aged eighteen or older, there were 91.1 males.

The median income for a household in the township was $29,830, and the median income for a family was $33,276. Males had a median income of $30,139 compared with that of $20,433 for females.

The per capita income for the township was $14,490.

Approximately 13.9% of families and 17.1% of the population were living below the poverty line, including 25.3% of those who were under the age of eighteen and 10.0% of those who were aged sixty-five or older.

== Cemeteries ==
- County Home Cemetery
- Kittanning Cemetery
- Pine Creek Baptist Church Cemetery
- Saint Joseph Cemetery
- Saint Marys Cemetery
