= Cowanshannock Creek =

Location
- Country: United States

Physical characteristics
- Source
  - coordinates: 40.8261758°N 79.1755926°W
- Mouth
  - coordinates: 40.8511753°N 79.5078224°W
  - elevation: 787 ft (240 m)

Basin features
- River system: Allegheny River

Cowanshannock Creek (the eastern section is sometimes referred to as the North Branch Cowanshannock Creek) is a tributary of the Allegheny River in Armstrong and Indiana counties, Pennsylvania in the United States.

== Course ==
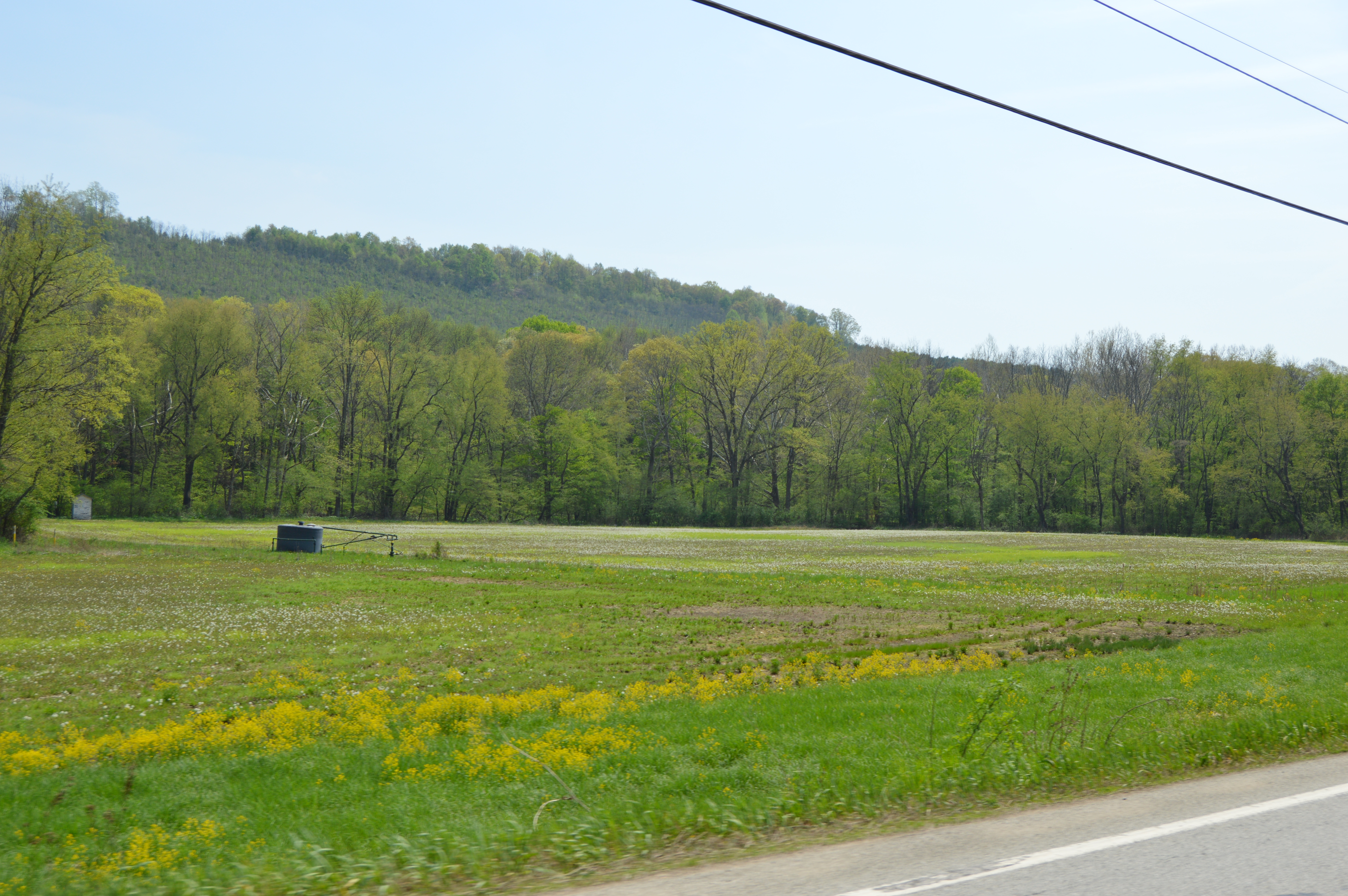
Creek floodplain in Valley Township

Cowanshannock Creek rises in South Mahoning Township in Indiana County, Pennsylvania. It flows west into Armstrong County meandering through Cowanshannock Township, the borough of Rural Valley, Valley Township, Manor Township, and Rayburn Township. The stream joins the Allegheny River on its right bank at the community of Gosford, approximately 3 miles (4.8 km) northeast of Kittanning.

=== Tributaries ===
(Mouth at the Allegheny River)

- Craigs Run
- Long Run
- Mill Run
- Spra Run
- Huskins Run
- South Branch Cowanshannock Creek
- Spruce Run

== See also ==
- Tributaries of the Allegheny River
- List of rivers of Pennsylvania
- List of tributaries of the Allegheny River
