= Burrell Township, Armstrong County, Pennsylvania =

Township in Pennsylvania, US

Coordinates: 40°40′15″N 79°26′31″W

- Township
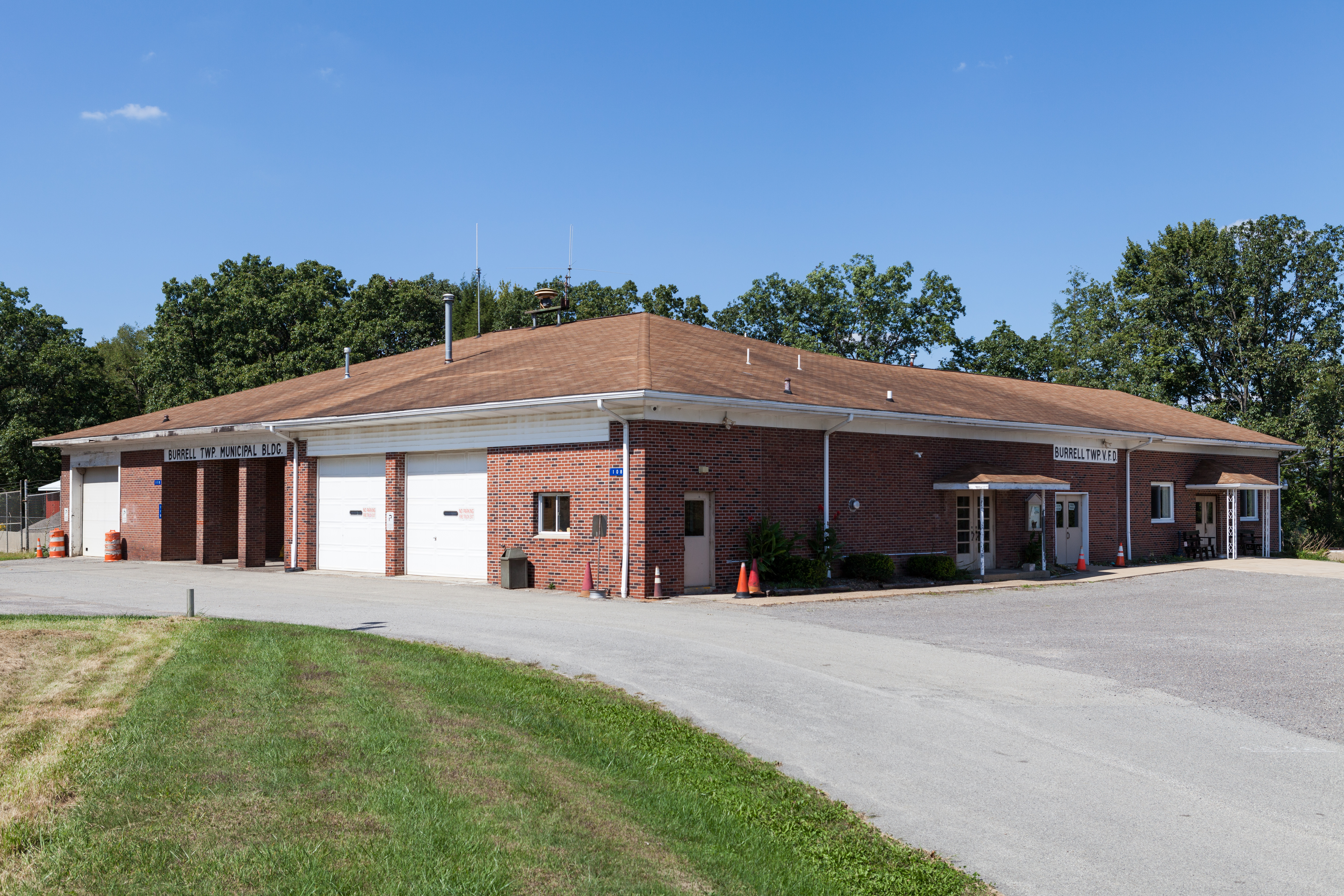
- Burrell Township VFD and Municipal Building

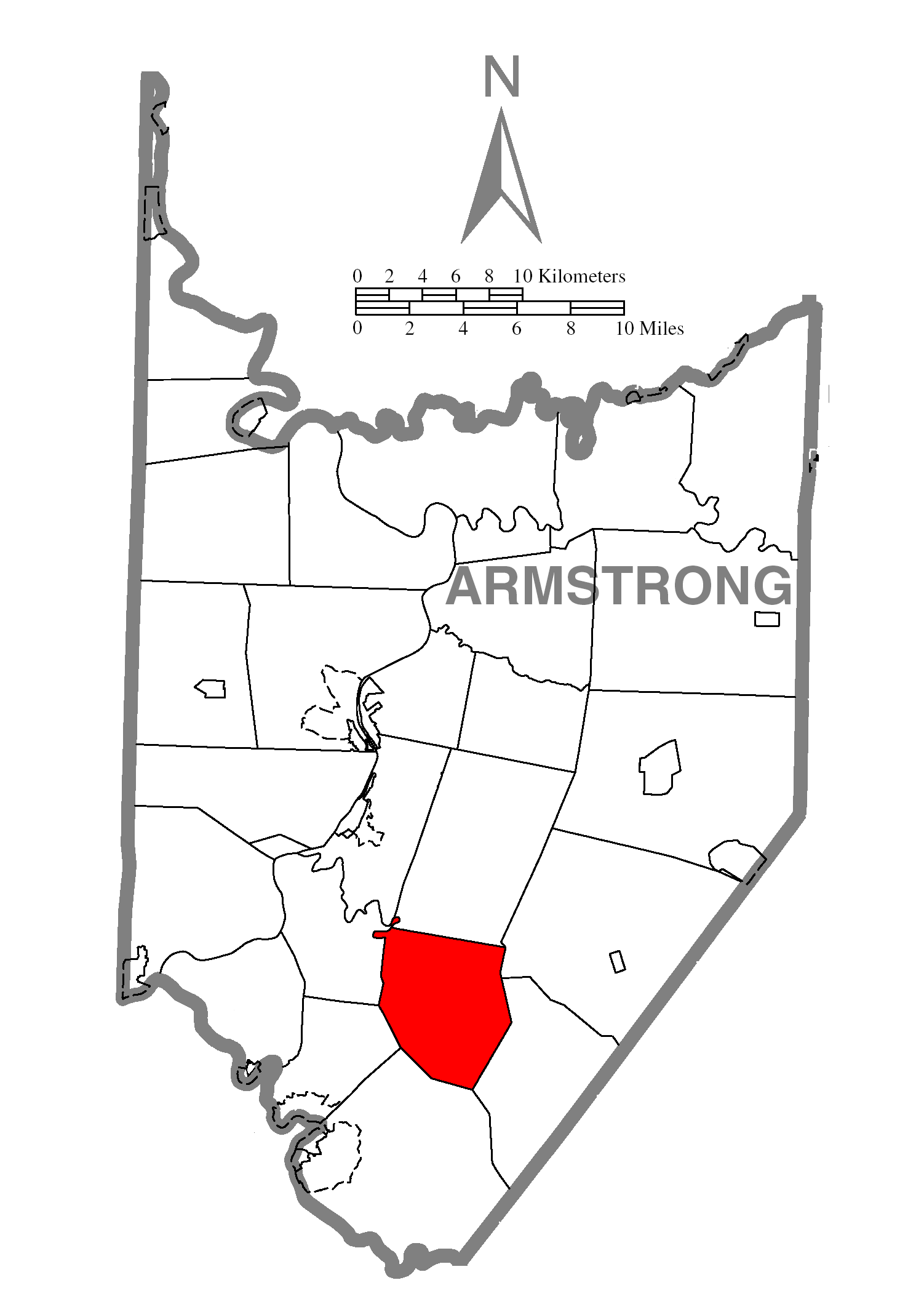
- Map of Armstrong County, Pennsylvania highlighting Burrell Township

- Map of Armstrong County, Pennsylvania
- Country: United States
- State: Pennsylvania
- County: Armstrong
- Settled: 1776
- Incorporated: 1855

Area
  - Total: 21.98 sq mi (56.93 km^{2})
  - Land: 21.46 sq mi (55.59 km^{2})
  - Water: 0.52 sq mi (1.34 km^{2})

Population (2020)
  - Total: 659
  - Estimate (2021): 654
  - Density: 32.0/sq mi (12.36/km^{2})
- Time zone: UTC-5 (Eastern (EST))
  - Summer (DST): UTC-4 (EDT)
- FIPS code: 42-005-10344

Burrell Township is a township in Armstrong County, Pennsylvania, United States, and is part of the Pittsburgh metropolitan area. The population was 659 at the 2020 census, a decrease from the figure of 689 tabulated in 2010.

== Geography ==
According to the United States Census Bureau, the township has a total area of 22.0 square miles (56.9 km^{2}), of which 21.5 square miles (55.6 km^{2}) is land and 0.50 square miles (1.3 km^{2}), or 2.35%, is water.

== Demographics ==
Historical population
Census	Pop.	Note	%±
2010	689		—
2020	659		−4.4%
2021 (est.)	654		−0.8%
U.S. Decennial Census

As of the 2000 census, there were 749 people, 299 households, and 226 families residing in the township. The population density was 35.1 inhabitants per square mile (13.6/km^{2}). There were 346 housing units at an average density of 16.2/sq mi (6.3/km^{2}). The racial makeup of the township was 99.33% White, 0.13% African American, 0.27% Native American, and 0.27% from two or more races. Hispanic or Latino of any race were 0.53% of the population.

There were 299 households, out of which 26.1% had children under the age of 18 living with them, 62.2% were married couples living together, 8.0% had a female householder with no husband present, and 24.1% were non-families. 21.1% of all households were made up of individuals, and 10.0% had someone living alone who was 65 years of age or older. The average household size was 2.51 and the average family size was 2.86.

The median age of 40 years was the same as that of the county of 40 years. The distribution was 20.6% under the age of 18, 7.2% from 18 to 24, 29.8% from 25 to 44, 27.6% from 45 to 64, and 14.8% who were 65 years of age or older. The median age was 40 years. For every 100 females, there were 106.3 males. For every 100 females age 18 and over, there were 101.7 males.

The median income for a household in the township was $34,792, and the median income for a family was $36,932. Males had a median income of $32,143 versus $20,536 for females. The per capita income for the township was $14,888. About 8.8% of families and 12.3% of the population were below the poverty line, including 18.2% of those under age 18 and 10.1% of those age 65 or over.

== Notable people ==
- Nellie Bly was born in 1864 in the township and raised on "Cochran's Mills". She was the very first notable celebrity who hailed from Armstrong County.
- Dorothy Ramale, a farmer's daughter from "Cochran's Mills", was involved in a then highly classified code breaking work during the Second World War, of which she could speak to her family and friends only much later in her life. (Liza Mundy, "Code Girls", Hachette Books, New York and Boston, 2018, p. 8).

== History ==
Burrell Township appears in the 1876 Atlas of Armstrong County, Pennsylvania. Its early history is detailed in Robert Walter Smith's 1883 History of Armstrong County.

== Cemeteries ==
- Cochrans Mill United Methodist Church Cemetery
- Dunkard Baptist Christian Brethren Cemetery
- McDonalds Cemetery
- Saint Michaels Lutheran Church Cemetery
- Shaeffer Cemetery
- Shellhammer - Beck Cemetery
- Shellhammer Cemetery
