= Manor Township, Armstrong County, Pennsylvania =

Township in Pennsylvania, US

Coordinates: 40°45′52″N 79°30′24″W

- Township
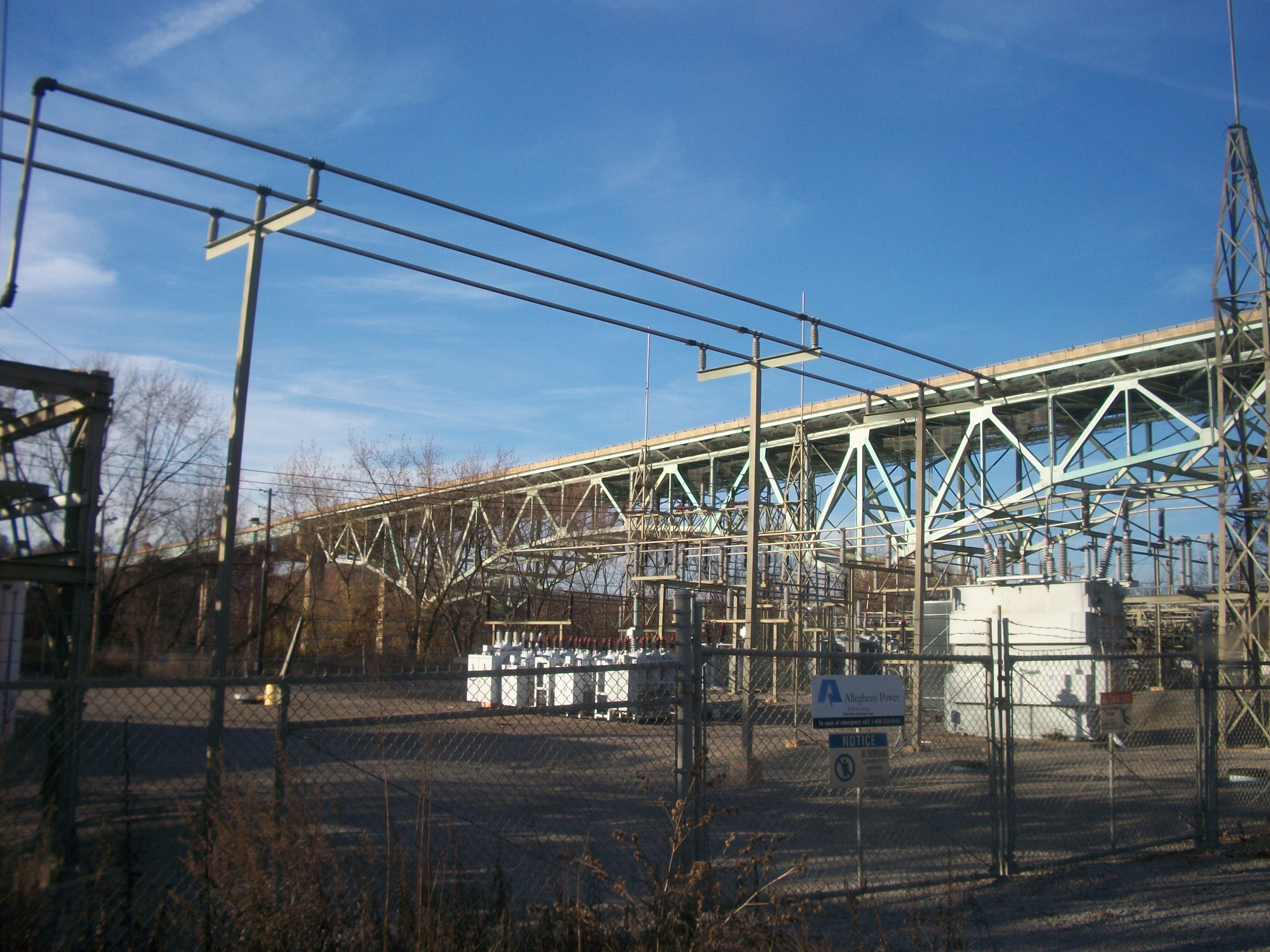
- The Judge J. Frank Graff Bridge, carrying U.S. Route 422 over the Allegheny River

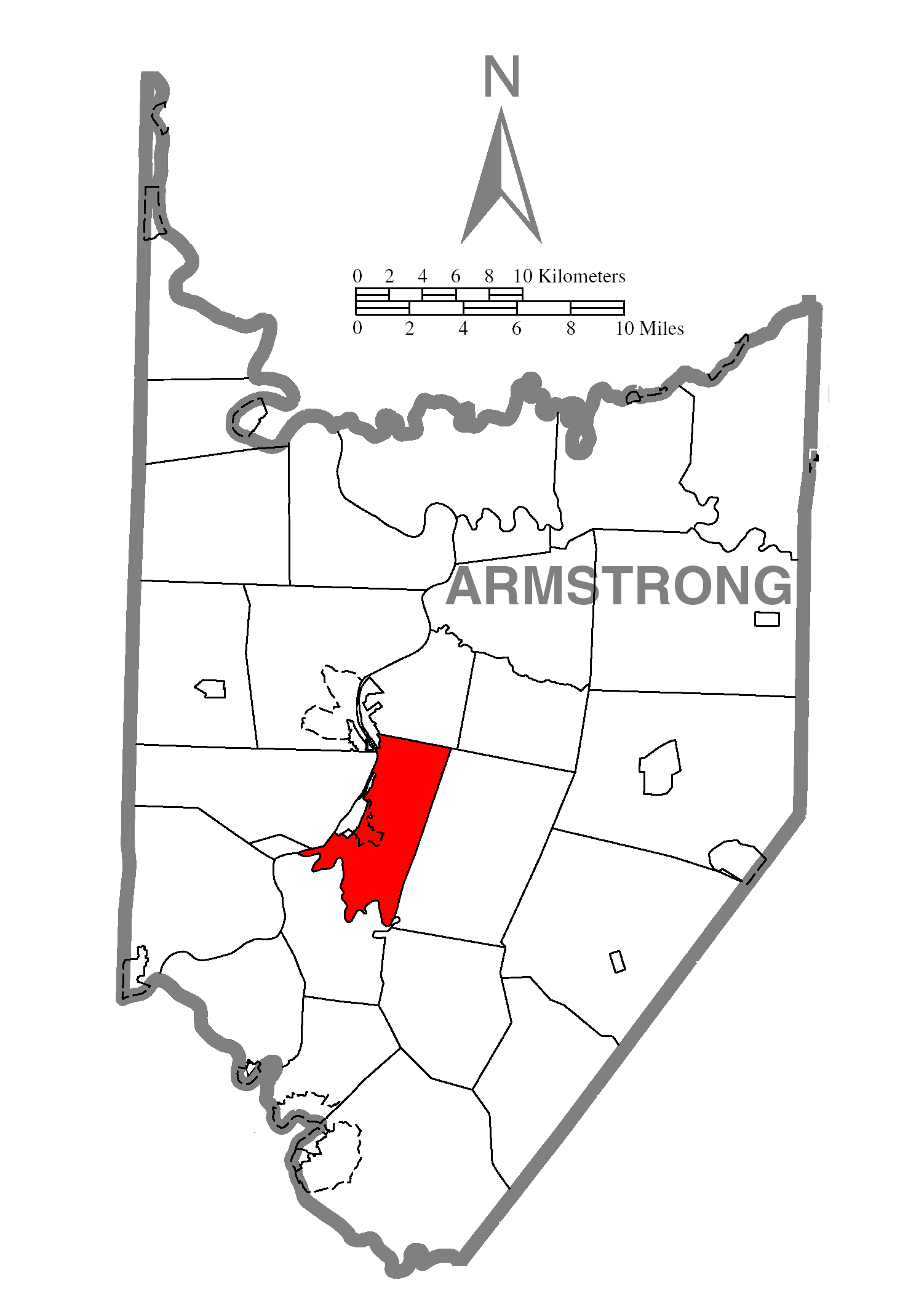
- Map of Armstrong County, Pennsylvania, highlighting Manor Township

- Map of Armstrong County, Pennsylvania
- Country: United States
- State: Pennsylvania
- County: Armstrong
- Settled: 1769
- Incorporated: 1849

Area
  - Total: 17.14 sq mi (44.39 km^{2})
  - Land: 16.58 sq mi (42.93 km^{2})
  - Water: 0.56 sq mi (1.46 km^{2})

Population (2020)
  - Total: 4,190
  - Estimate (2021): 4,153
  - Density: 252.0/sq mi (97.28/km^{2})
- Time zone: UTC-5 (Eastern (EST))
  - Summer (DST): UTC-4 (EDT)
- FIPS code: 42-005-46976
- Website: www.manortownshippa.com

Manor Township is a township in Armstrong County, Pennsylvania, United States. The population was 4,190 at the 2020 census, a decrease from the figure of 4,227 tabulated in 2010.

== Geography ==
Manor Township is located in central Armstrong County. It is bordered to the west by the Allegheny River and by the boroughs of Ford Cliff, Ford City, and Manorville. The borough of Kittanning borders the short, northwestern edge of the township. Crooked Creek forms the southern border of the township, and Cowanshannock Creek meanders through a small northeast section of the township. Ross Island is within the township in the Allegheny River. It contains the census-designated place of Lenape Heights.

According to the United States Census Bureau, the township has a total area of 17.1 square miles (44.4 km^{2}), of which 16.6 square miles (43.0 km^{2}) is land and 0.54 square miles (1.4 km^{2}), or 3.23%, is water.

== Demographics ==
Historical population
Census	Pop.	Note	%±
2010	4,227		—
2020	4,190		−0.9%
2021 (est.)	4,153		−0.9%
U.S. Decennial Census

As of the 2000 census, there were 4,231 people, 1,752 households, and 1,254 families residing in the township. The population density was 254.7 inhabitants per square mile (98.3/km^{2}). There were 1,879 housing units at an average density of 113.1 per square mile (43.7/km^{2}). The racial makeup of the township was 98.49% White, 0.61% African American, 0.12% Native American, 0.09% Asian, 0.02% Pacific Islander, 0.09% from other races, and 0.57% from two or more races. Hispanic or Latino of any race were 0.38% of the population.

There were 1,752 households, out of which 27.5% had children under the age of 18 living with them, 60.6% were married couples living together, 7.4% had a female householder with no husband present, and 28.4% were non-families. 25.2% of all households were made up of individuals, and 13.8% had someone living alone who was 65 years of age or older. The average household size was 2.40 and the average family size was 2.87.

The township median age of 43 years was significantly more than the county median age of 40 years. The distribution by age group was 21.7% under the age of 18, 5.8% from 18 to 24, 26.0% from 25 to 44, 25.6% from 45 to 64, and 20.9% who were 65 years of age or older. The median age was 43 years. For every 100 females there were 94.4 males. For every 100 females age 18 and over, there were 93.2 males.

The median income for a household in the township was $34,452, and the median income for a family was $43,603. Males had a median income of $31,491 versus $22,668 for females. The per capita income for the township was $18,789. About 6.0% of families and 7.3% of the population were below the poverty line, including 10.5% of those under age 18 and 4.6% of those age 65 or over.

== History ==
Manor Township appears in the 1876 Atlas of Armstrong County, Pennsylvania. Its early history is detailed in Robert Walter Smith's 1883 History of Armstrong County.

== Cemeteries ==
- Appleby Manor Presbyterian Church Cemetery
- Black / Herman Church Cemetery
- Ford City Cemetery
- Holy Trinity Cemetery
- Oakland Cemetery
- Saint Marys Cemetery
- Ukrainian / Saint Marys Ukrainian Catholic Cemetery
