= North Buffalo Township, Pennsylvania =

Township in Pennsylvania, US

Coordinates: 40°47′N 79°36′W

- Township
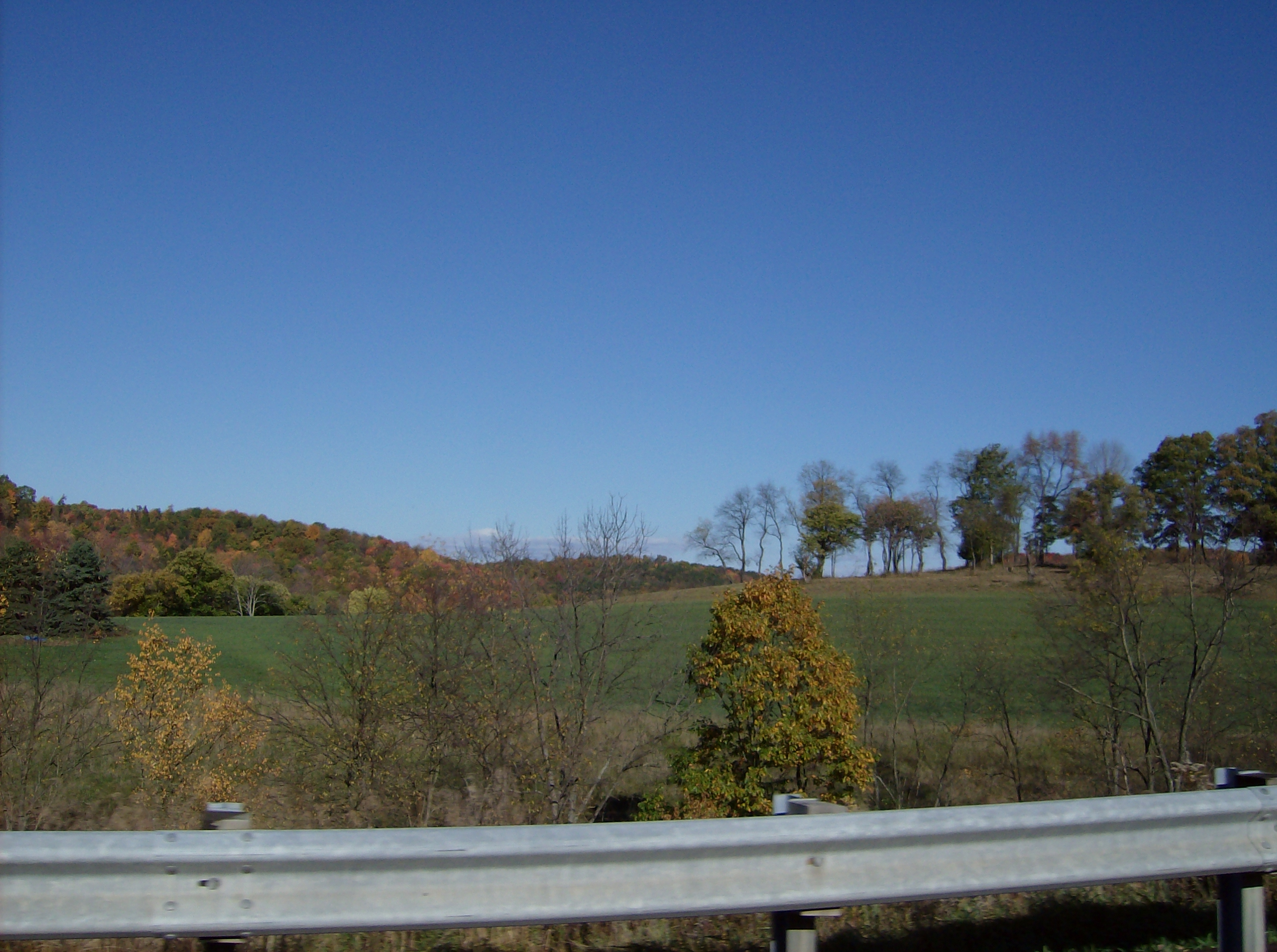
- Countryside in North Buffalo Township

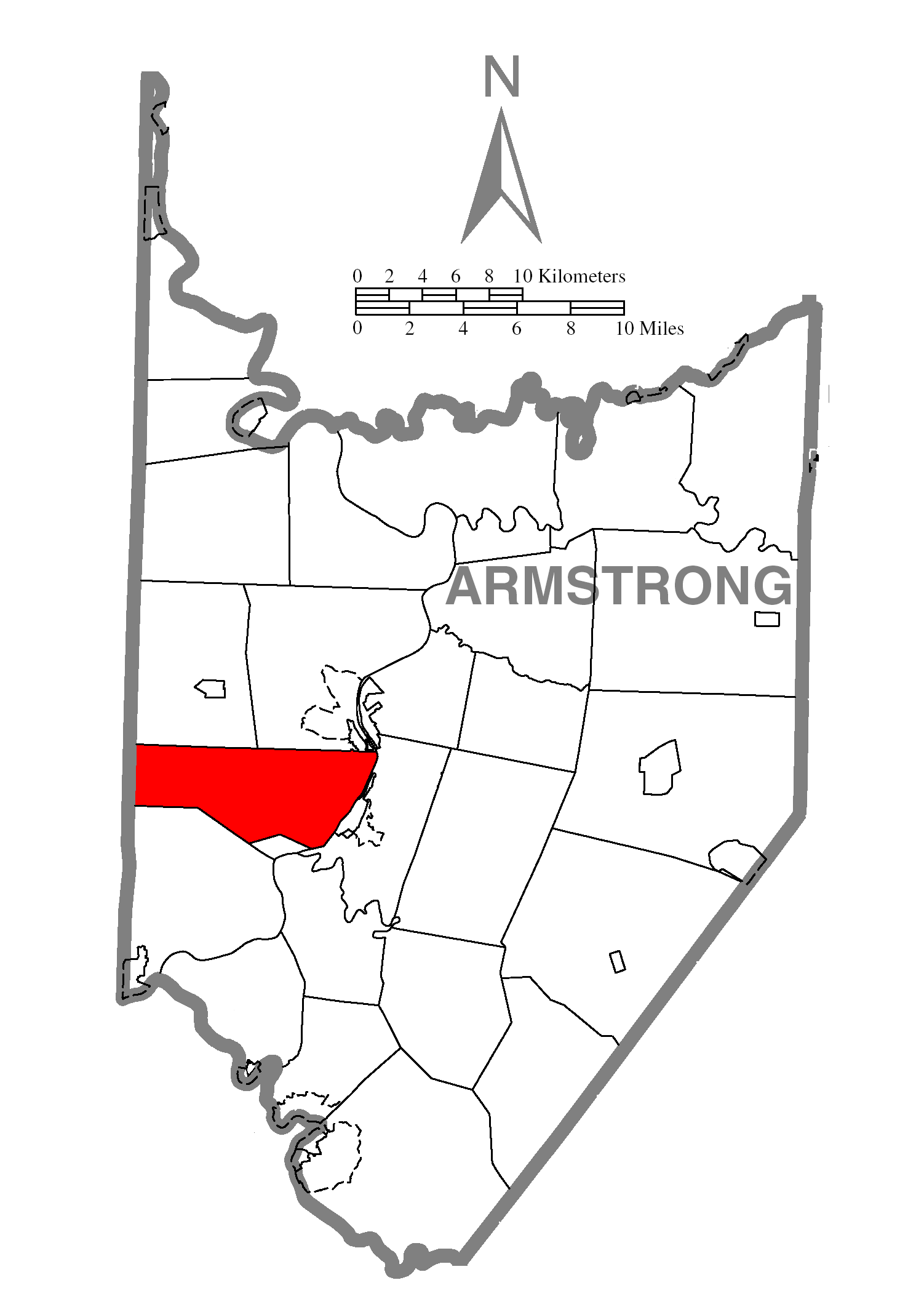
- Map of Armstrong County, Pennsylvania, highlighting North Buffalo Township

- Map of Armstrong County, Pennsylvania
- Country: United States
- State: Pennsylvania
- County: Armstrong
- Settled: 1795
- Incorporated: 1847

Government
  - Type: Board of Supervisors
  - Chairman: Rick Adams
  - Supervisor: Paul Kirkwood
  - Supervisor: William Gray

Area
  - Total: 25.14 sq mi (65.11 km^{2})
  - Land: 24.74 sq mi (64.08 km^{2})
  - Water: 0.40 sq mi (1.03 km^{2})

Population (2020)
  - Total: 2,698
  - Estimate (2021): 2,676
  - Density: 119.1/sq mi (45.97/km^{2})
- Time zone: UTC-5 (Eastern (EST))
  - Summer (DST): UTC-4 (EDT)
- FIPS code: 42-005-54856
- Website: https://northbuffalotwp.com/

North Buffalo Township is a township in Armstrong County, Pennsylvania, United States. The population was 2,698 at the 2020 census, a decrease from the figure of 3,011 tabulated in 2010.

== Geography ==
North Buffalo Township is located in western Armstrong County, extending from the west bank of the Allegheny River to the western county line. The unincorporated community of North Buffalo is located in the southern part of the township, just north of Cadogan Township. Buffalo Creek flows southward through the western part of the township. Cogley Island is within the township in the Allegheny River.

According to the United States Census Bureau, the township has a total area of 25.1 square miles (65.1 km^{2}), of which 24.7 square miles (64.0 km^{2}) is land and 0.42 square miles (1.1 km^{2}), or 1.70%, is water.

== Recreation ==
Pennsylvania State Game Lands Number 247 is located in North Buffalo Township.

== Demographics ==
Historical population
Census	Pop.	Note	%±
2010	3,011		—
2020	2,698		−10.4%
2021 (est.)	2,676		−0.8%
U.S. Decennial Census

As of the 2000 census, there were 2,942 people, 1,151 households, and 888 families residing in the township. The population density was 119.2 inhabitants per square mile (46.0/km^{2}). There were 1,203 housing units at an average density of 48.8 per square mile (18.8/km^{2}). The racial makeup of the township was 99.46% White, 0.17% African American, 0.20% Asian, 0.03% Pacific Islander, and 0.14% from two or more races. Hispanic or Latino of any race were 0.48% of the population.

There were 1,151 households, out of which 32.2% had children under the age of 18 living with them, 66.3% were married couples living together, 7.2% had a female householder with no husband present, and 22.8% were non-families. 20.1% of all households were made up of individuals, and 10.3% had someone living alone who was 65 years of age or older. The average household size was 2.54 and the average family size was 2.92.

The township median age of 40 years was the same as the county median age of 40 years. The distribution by age group was 23.2% under the age of 18, 6.2% from 18 to 24, 28.6% from 25 to 44, 24.8% from 45 to 64, and 17.3% who were 65 years of age or older. The median age was 40 years. For every 100 females, there were 101.9 males. For every 100 females age 18 and over, there were 99.9 males.

The median income for a household in the township was $37,375, and the median income for a family was $43,359. Males had a median income of $32,168 versus $21,406 for females. The per capita income for the township was $16,528. About 4.2% of families and 7.6% of the population were below the poverty line, including 8.4% of those under age 18 and 6.5% of those age 65 or over.

== History ==
North Buffalo Township appears in the 1876 Atlas of Armstrong County, Pennsylvania.

== Cemeteries ==
- Bonner Cemetery
- Center Hill Church of the Brethren Cemetery
- Cowan Cemetery
- Grace Brethren Church Cemetery
- Green Cemetery
- Guardian Angel Cemetery
- Union Baptist Cemetery
