= Cadogan Township, Pennsylvania =

Township in Pennsylvania, US

Coordinates: 40°45′04″N 79°34′35″W

- Township
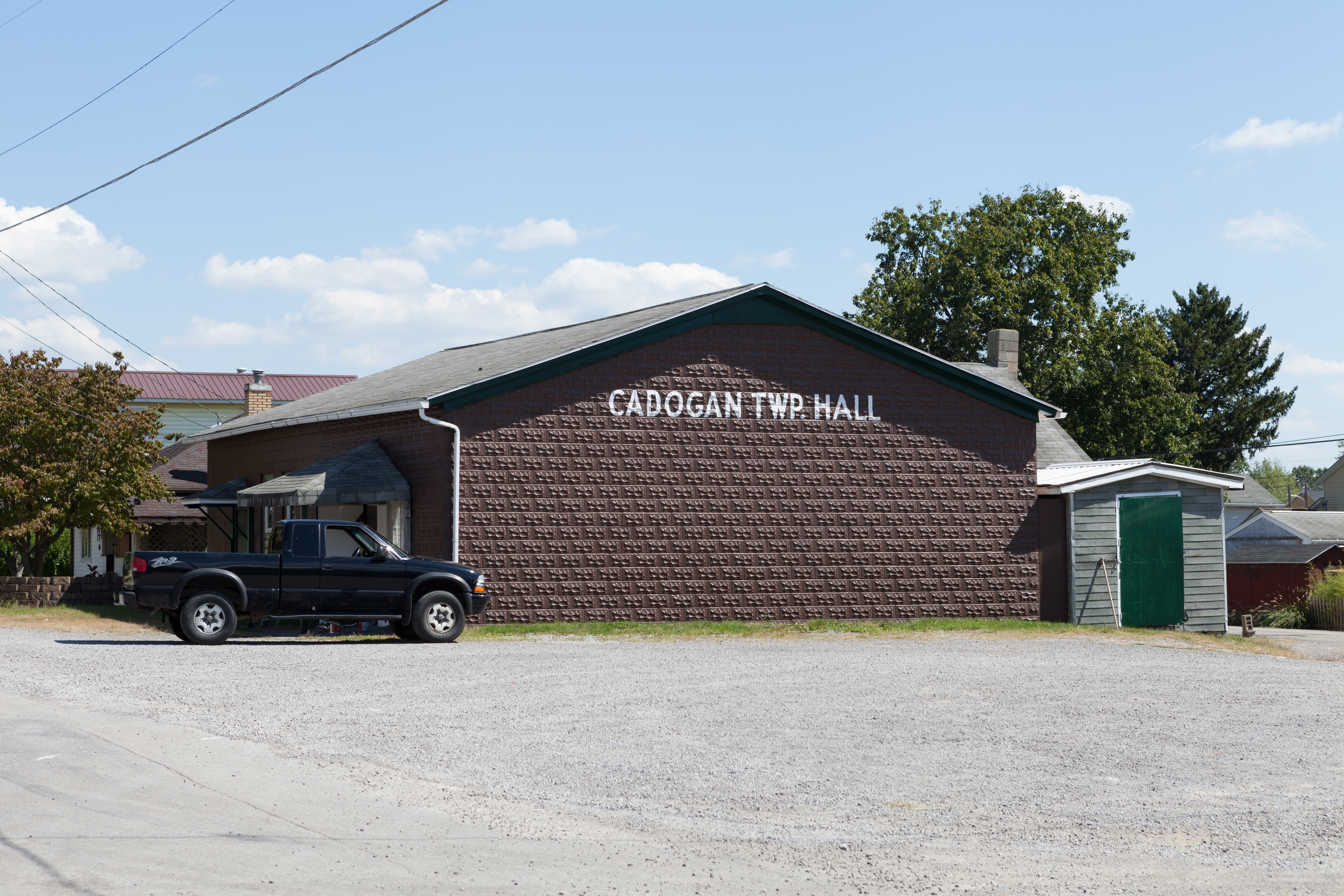
- Cadogan Township Hall

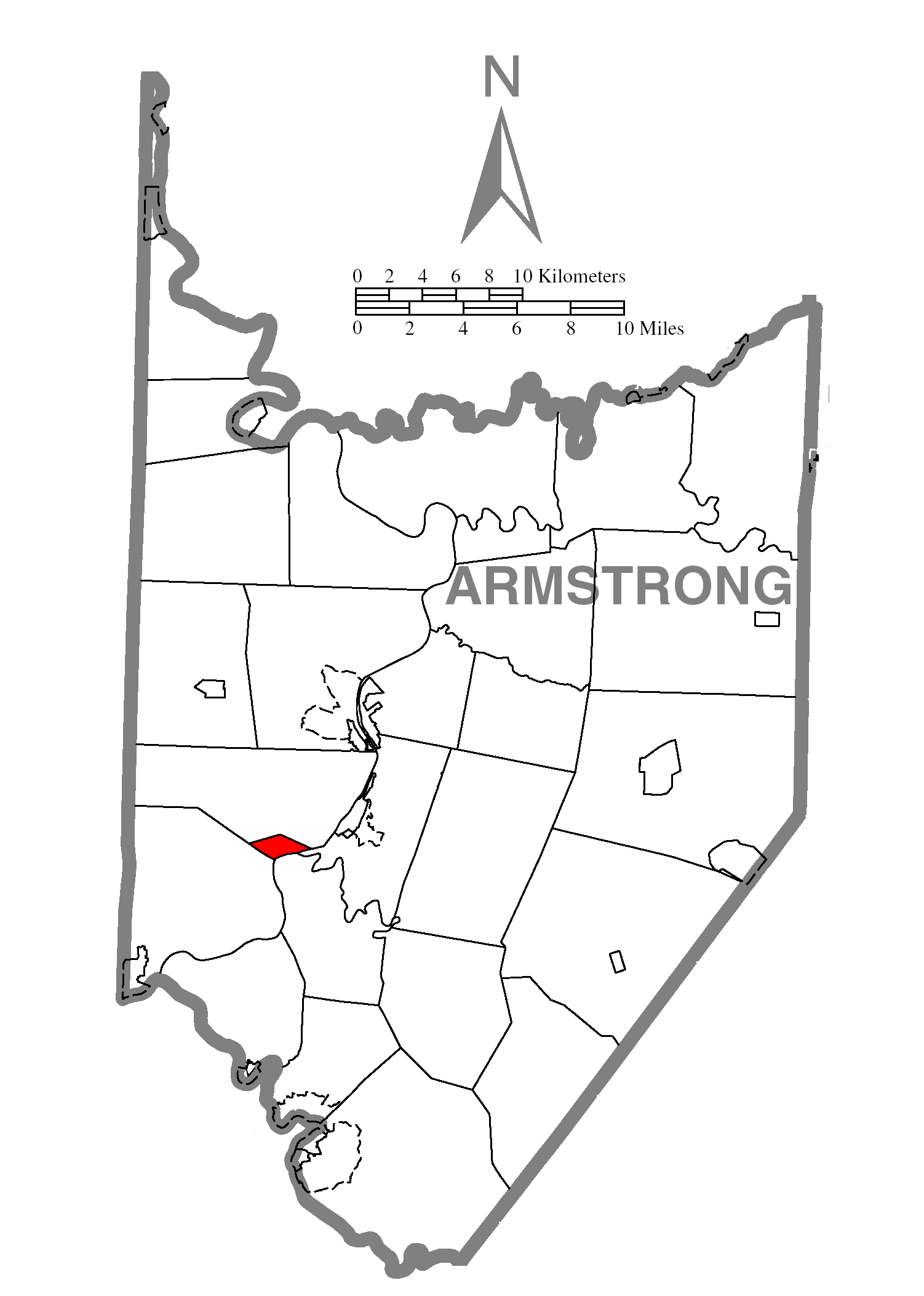
- Map of Armstrong County, Pennsylvania, highlighting Cadogan Township

- Map of Armstrong County, Pennsylvania
- Country: United States
- State: Pennsylvania
- County: Armstrong
- Incorporated: 1922

Area
  - Total: 1.11 sq mi (2.87 km^{2})
  - Land: 0.98 sq mi (2.53 km^{2})
  - Water: 0.13 sq mi (0.34 km^{2})

Population (2020)
  - Total: 346
  - Estimate (2021): 344
  - Density: 329.9/sq mi (127.38/km^{2})
- Time zone: UTC-5 (Eastern (EST))
  - Summer (DST): UTC-4 (EDT)
- ZIP code: 16212 (Cadogan)
- FIPS code: 42-005-10680

Cadogan Township is a township in Armstrong County, Pennsylvania, United States. The population was 346 at the 2020 census, an increase over the figure of 344 tabulated in 2010.

== Geography ==
The township consists solely of the community of Cadogan. It is located on the northwestern bank of the Allegheny River, 37 miles (60 km) northeast of downtown Pittsburgh and 3 miles (5 km) southwest of Ford City.

According to the United States Census Bureau, the township has a total area of 1.1 square miles (2.9 km^{2}), of which 1.0 square mile (2.6 km^{2}) is land and 0.12 square miles (0.3 km^{2}), or 10.94%, is water.

== Demographics ==
Historical population
Census	Pop.	Note	%±
2010	344		—
2020	346		0.6%
2021 (est.)	344		−0.6%
U.S. Decennial Census

As of the 2000 census, there were 390 people, 175 households, and 110 families residing in the township. The population density was 415.1 inhabitants per square mile (160.3/km^{2}). There were 181 housing units at an average density of 192.6 per square mile (74.4/km^{2}). The racial makeup of the township was 99.74% White, and 0.26% from two or more races.

There were 175 households, out of which 21.1% had children under the age of 18 living with them, 50.3% were married couples living together, 10.3% had a female householder with no husband present, and 36.6% were non-families. 33.1% of all households were made up of individuals, and 26.3% had someone living alone who was 65 years of age or older. The average household size was 2.23 and the average family size was 2.80.

The median age of 44 years was significantly more than that of the county of 40 years. The distribution was 17.4% under the age of 18, 9.5% from 18 to 24, 24.9% from 25 to 44, 23.6% from 45 to 64, and 24.6% who were 65 years of age or older. The median age was 44 years. For every 100 females, there were 95.0 males. For every 100 females age 18 and over, there were 88.3 males.

The median income for a household in the township was $27,778, and the median income for a family was $37,917. Males had a median income of $31,875 versus $20,625 for females. The per capita income for the township was $16,122. About 1.7% of families and 5.4% of the population were below the poverty line, including none of those under age 18 and 8.9% of those age 65 or over.
