= National Register of Historic Places listings in Westmoreland County, Pennsylvania =

Location of Westmoreland County

This is a list of the National Register of Historic Places listings in Westmoreland County, Pennsylvania.

This is intended to be a complete list of the properties and districts on the National Register of Historic Places in Westmoreland County, Pennsylvania, United States. The locations of National Register properties and districts for which the latitude and longitude coordinates are included below, may be seen in a map.

There are 54 properties and districts listed on the National Register in the county. One site is further designated as a National Historic Landmark. Another property was once listed but has been removed.

This National Park Service list is complete through NPS recent listings posted May 1, 2026.

== Current listings ==
	Name on the Register	Image	Date listed	Location	Municipality	Description
1	Academy Hill Historic District	Academy Hill Historic District	April 29, 1999 (#99000516)	Roughly bounded by Baughman Street, North Maple Avenue, Kenneth Street, Culbertson Avenue, Beacon Street, and Pennsylvania Avenue; 40°18′39″N 79°32′42″W	Greensburg	
2	Allegheny River Lock and Dam No. 4	Allegheny River Lock and Dam No. 4	April 21, 2000 (#00000398)	1 River Avenue; 40°36′52″N 79°42′59″W	Lower Burrell	Extends into Harrison Township in Allegheny County
3	Aluminum Research Laboratories	Aluminum Research Laboratories	July 23, 2013 (#98000413)	Freeport Road; 40°34′19″N 79°45′21″W	New Kensington	
4	Bells Mills Covered Bridge	Bells Mills Covered Bridge	June 27, 1980 (#80003648)	West of Yukon; 40°13′09″N 79°42′37″W	Sewickley and South Huntingdon Townships	
5	Brush Creek Salems Church	Brush Creek Salems Church	May 11, 1987 (#87000675)	Southeast of Westmoreland City on Brush Creek Road; 40°19′09″N 79°39′30″W	Hempfield Township	
6	Brush Hill	Brush Hill	October 14, 1975 (#75001677)	651 Brush Hill Road; 40°19′30″N 79°41′22″W	Irwin	
7	Bushy Run Battlefield	Bushy Run Battlefield	October 15, 1966 (#66000696)	2 miles (3.2 km) east of Harrison City on Pennsylvania Route 993; 40°21′21″N 79°37′30″W	Penn Township	
8	Byerly House	Byerly House	July 18, 1985 (#85001567)	115 Menk Road, east of New Kensington; 40°33′14″N 79°41′02″W	Upper Burrell Township	
9	Charleroi-Monessen Bridge	Charleroi-Monessen Bridge	June 22, 1988 (#88000812)	Legislative Route 247 over the Monongahela River; 40°09′06″N 79°54′15″W	Monessen	Extends into North Charleroi in Washington County
10	Citizens National Bank of Latrobe	Citizens National Bank of Latrobe	November 1, 2002 (#02001281)	816 Ligonier Street; 40°19′00″N 79°23′05″W	Latrobe	
11	Compass Inn	Compass Inn	February 24, 1995 (#95000124)	Junction of U.S. Route 30 (the Lincoln Highway) and California Avenue; 40°12′43″N 79°11′57″W	Ligonier Township	
12	Concord School	Concord School	September 30, 2014 (#14000817)	Loyalhanna Dam Rd. 40°26′28″N 79°28′04″W	Loyalhanna Township	1848 schoolhouse.
13	Dick Building	Dick Building	August 30, 2007 (#07000890)	201–203 East Main Street; 40°12′06″N 79°46′00″W	West Newton	
14	Fairview Park	Fairview Park	December 27, 2010 (#10001069)	South side of Old Route 22, approximately 1.5 miles (2.4 km) east of Delmont; 40°24′21″N 79°33′21″W	Salem Township	
15	Adam Fisher Homestead	Adam Fisher Homestead	February 28, 1991 (#91000230)	Brinkerton Road near junction with Mount Pleasant Road, northwest of Calumet; 40°13′09″N 79°30′10″W	Mount Pleasant Township	
16	Fort Ligonier Site	Fort Ligonier Site	January 21, 1975 (#75001678)	South Market Street; 40°14′27″N 79°14′16″W	Ligonier	
17	Fullerton Inn	Fullerton Inn	June 30, 1983 (#83002285)	11029 Old Trail Road, west of Irwin; 40°19′47″N 79°43′35″W	North Huntingdon Township	
18	Greensburg Downtown Historic District	Greensburg Downtown Historic District	July 21, 1995 (#95000884)	Roughly bounded by Tunnel Street, Main Street, Third Street and Harrison Avenue; 40°18′11″N 79°32′42″W	Greensburg	
19	Greensburg Railroad Station	Greensburg Railroad Station	November 7, 1977 (#77001202)	Harrison Avenue; 40°18′16″N 79°32′49″W	Greensburg	
20	Hannastown Farm	Hannastown Farm	March 17, 1994 (#94000209)	Northwest of the junction of Township 825 and Legislative Route 64054; 40°21′11″N 79°30′21″W	Salem Township	
21	Household No. 1 Site (36WM61)	Household No. 1 Site (36WM61)	March 20, 1986 (#86000465)	Off Timms Lane; 40°10′27″N 79°46′44″W	Rostraver Township	
22	Kingston House	Kingston House	June 30, 1983 (#83002286)	U.S. Route 30, northeast of Youngstown; 40°17′28″N 79°20′29″W	Unity Township	
23	Latrobe Armory	Latrobe Armory	December 22, 1989 (#89002076)	1017 Ridge Avenue; 40°19′00″N 79°22′53″W	Latrobe	
24	Laurel Hill Furnace	Laurel Hill Furnace	April 28, 1975 (#75001679)	Southeast of New Florence on Baldwin Run; 40°22′00″N 79°03′32″W	St. Clair Township	
25	Ligonier Armory	Ligonier Armory	May 9, 1991 (#91000514)	358 West Main Street; 40°14′49″N 79°14′33″W	Ligonier	Demolished.
26	Ligonier Historic District	Ligonier Historic District	August 30, 1994 (#94001054)	Junction of Main and Market Streets; 40°14′35″N 79°14′16″W	Ligonier	
27	Linn Run State Park Family Cabin District	Linn Run State Park Family Cabin District	February 12, 1987 (#87000107)	2 miles (3.2 km) southeast of Rector on Linn Run Road; 40°09′14″N 79°13′00″W	Cook Township	
28	Loyalhanna Lodge No. 275	Loyalhanna Lodge No. 275	February 2, 2016 (#15001036)	221 Spring St. 40°18′54″N 79°23′00″W	Latrobe	
29	Andrew and Jennie McFarlane House	Andrew and Jennie McFarlane House	August 4, 2004 (#04000807)	50 Maus Drive, west of Irwin; 40°19′47″N 79°44′21″W	North Huntingdon Township	
30	Mount Pleasant Armory	Mount Pleasant Armory	December 22, 1989 (#89002079)	Eagle and Spring Streets; 40°08′59″N 79°32′54″W	Mount Pleasant	Demolished in 1996
31	Mount Pleasant Historic District	Mount Pleasant Historic District	July 23, 1998 (#98000903)	Roughly along Main, South Church, Eagle, Walnut and College Streets; 40°08′54″N 79°32′41″W	Mount Pleasant	
32	Mount St. Peter Catholic Church	Mount St. Peter Catholic Church	May 5, 1998 (#98000398)	100 Freeport Road; 40°33′50″N 79°45′42″W	New Kensington	
33	New Kensington Downtown Historic District	New Kensington Downtown Historic District	July 23, 1998 (#98000904)	Roughly bounded by 8th Avenue, 3rd Street, 11th Avenue, and Barnes Avenue; 40°33′58″N 79°45′58″W	New Kensington	
34	New Kensington Production Works Historic District	New Kensington Production Works Historic District	May 7, 1998 (#98000397)	Roughly along the Allegheny River, from Sixteenth Street to Seventh Street; 40°33′56″N 79°46′13″W	New Kensington	
35	Samuel Patterson House	Samuel Patterson House	March 7, 1985 (#85000472)	Pennsylvania Route 981, north of New Alexandria; 40°23′58″N 79°25′20″W	Derry Township	
36	Pennsylvania Railroad Station-Latrobe	Pennsylvania Railroad Station-Latrobe	July 17, 1986 (#86001689)	Depot Street; 40°19′07″N 79°23′08″W	Latrobe	
37	Plumer House	Plumer House	December 6, 1979 (#79002368)	Vine and South Water Street; 40°12′33″N 79°46′10″W	West Newton	
38	Ross Furnace	Ross Furnace	September 6, 1991 (#91001142)	Southwest of Tubmill Reservoir off Pennsylvania Route 711; 40°19′33″N 79°05′26″W	Fairfield Township	
39	St. Gertrude Catholic Church	St. Gertrude Catholic Church	September 23, 1983 (#83002287)	311 Franklin Avenue; 40°35′59″N 79°33′52″W	Vandergrift	
40	St. Vincent Archabbey Gristmill	St. Vincent Archabbey Gristmill	January 18, 1978 (#78002486)	Southwest of Latrobe off U.S. Route 30; 40°17′43″N 79°24′10″W	Unity Township	
41	Salem Crossroads Historic District	Salem Crossroads Historic District	September 18, 1978 (#78002484)	Pittsburgh and Greensburg Streets; 40°24′44″N 79°34′10″W	Delmont	
42	Scottdale Armory	Scottdale Armory	May 9, 1991 (#91000518)	501 North Broadway Street; 40°06′17″N 79°35′08″W	Scottdale	
43	Scottdale Historic District	Scottdale Historic District	March 29, 1996 (#96000320)	Roughly bounded by Walnut Street, Constitution Way, Arthur Avenue and Jacob's Creek; 40°06′05″N 79°35′22″W	Scottdale	
44	Sewickley Manor	Sewickley Manor	April 19, 1982 (#82003820)	Legislative Route 64136, north of Calumet; 40°14′05″N 79°28′56″W	Mount Pleasant Township	
45	Site of Old Hannastown	Site of Old Hannastown	January 26, 1972 (#72001180)	4 miles (6.4 km) northeast of Greensburg; 40°20′37″N 79°30′19″W	Hempfield Township	
46	Slickville Historic District	Slickville Historic District	June 3, 1994 (#94000522)	Roughly bounded by Greenburg and Second Avenue and Delmont, Court, Cottage and Fred Streets, in Slickville; 40°27′27″N 79°31′23″W	Salem Township	
47	Squirrel Hill Site	Squirrel Hill Site	March 26, 1980 (#80003647)	West of New Florence near the banks of the Conemaugh River; 40°22′49″N 79°05′20″W	St. Clair Township	
48	Vandergrift Historic District	Vandergrift Historic District	April 27, 1995 (#95000525)	Roughly bounded by Lincoln, Sherman, Franklin and Washington Avenues, along the outer lot lines 40°36′09″N 79°33′44″W	Vandergrift	
49	John Walter Farmstead	John Walter Farmstead	July 21, 1995 (#95000885)	166 Mamont Drive; 40°28′19″N 79°35′21″W	Washington Township	
50	Samuel Warden House	Samuel Warden House	November 7, 1995 (#95001252)	200 South Church Street; 40°08′52″N 79°32′50″W	Mount Pleasant	
51	Webster Donora Bridge	Webster Donora Bridge	June 22, 1988 (#88000813)	Pennsylvania Route 143 over the Monongahela River at Webster; 40°11′03″N 79°51′08″W	Rostraver Township	Extends into Washington County
52	West Overton Historic District	West Overton Historic District	July 18, 1985 (#85001572)	Frick Avenue; 40°06′59″N 79°33′59″W	East Huntingdon Township	
53	Western Division-Pennsylvania Canal	Western Division-Pennsylvania Canal	September 17, 1974 (#74001817)	Along the Conemaugh River; 40°25′30″N 79°13′48″W	Bell Township, Bolivar, Derry Township, Fairfield Township, and Loyalhanna Township	Boundaries increased on November 14, 1982 under the name "Western Division of the PA Canal"
54	Westmoreland County Courthouse	Westmoreland County Courthouse	March 30, 1978 (#78002485)	North Main Street; 40°18′09″N 79°32′46″W	Greensburg	

== Former listing ==
	Name on the Register	Image	Date listed	Date removed	Location	Municipality	Description
1	General Greene Hotel	General Greene Hotel	August 29, 1980 (#80003646)	June 16, 1986	24 West Otterman Street	Greensburg	Built in 1903. Demolished in January 1984.
2	McCormick House		October 21, 1976 (#76002286)	December 21, 1976	508 Main St.	Irwin	

== See also ==
- List of Pennsylvania state historical markers in Westmoreland County
