= Crabtree, Pennsylvania =

Unincorporated community in Pennsylvania, US

Crabtree
- Census-designated place
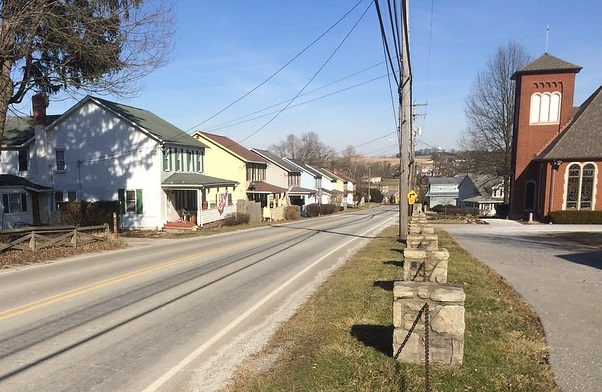
- The main street, US Route 119, looking northeast from Cemetery Drive. Houses built for miners visible at left.

- Location within the U.S. state of Pennsylvania Crabtree (the United States)
- Coordinates: 40°21′48″N 79°28′11″W
- Country: United States
- State: Pennsylvania
- County: Westmoreland

Area
  - Total: 0.093 sq mi (0.24 km^{2})
  - Land: 0.093 sq mi (0.24 km^{2})
  - Water: 0 sq mi (0.00 km^{2})

Population (2020)
  - Total: 201
  - Density: 2,155.8/sq mi (832.37/km^{2})
- Time zone: UTC-5 (Eastern (EST))
  - Summer (DST): UTC-4 (EDT)
- ZIP codes: 15624
- FIPS code: 42-16816

Crabtree is a census-designated place (CDP) and former coal town in Salem Township, Westmoreland County, Pennsylvania, United States. The population was 277 at the 2010 census. It has its own post office, with postal code 15624, and a Catholic church established in 1903 on land donated by the Jamison Coal & Coke Company.

== History ==
The town was originally named Goff. In the 1880s, Thomas Donohoe's Alexandria Coal Company began mining and coking operations nearby and built company houses in the town.

The Jamison Coal & Coke Company acquired the mine in 1901. Renamed the No. 4 mine, it contained two slope entries, one in Salem Township and the other in Unity Township.

The mine attracted Italian and Polish families seeking employment. As it expanded, The Alexandria Branch of the Pennsylvania Railroad served the No. 4 mine. Jamison Coal & Coke expanded the town of Goff, constructing houses in Unity and Salem townships. The growing town of Goff had its name changed to Crabtree in 1908, and the original village of Crabtree, about 2 miles southeast of Goff, became known as Old Crabtree. The Jamison No. 4 mine at one time employed between 350 and 400 persons. Mines Nos. 4 and 5 continued to operate through the 1930s. Subsequently, a strip mine was developed along Crabtree Creek.

See also:

- Appalachian Coalfields
- Pennsylvania Mine Map Alas

== Geography ==
Crabtree is located at 40°21′48″N 79°28′11″W (40.363400, -79.469664).

According to the United States Census Bureau, the CDP has a total area of 0.1 square miles (0.26 km^{2}), all land.

== Demographics ==
Historical population
Census	Pop.	Note	%±
2020	201		—
U.S. Decennial Census

At the 2000 census there were 320 people, 147 households, and 98 families living in the CDP. The population density was 3,234.8 inhabitants per square mile (1,249.0/km^{2}). There were 160 housing units at an average density of 1,617.4 per square mile (624.5/km^{2}). The racial makeup of the CDP was 99.06% White and 0.94% African American. Of the 147 households 19.7% had children under the age of 18 living with them, 51.0% were married couples living together, 8.8% had a female householder with no husband present, and 33.3% were non-families. 29.3% of households were one person and 18.4% were one person aged 65 or older. The average household size was 2.16 and the average family size was 2.61.

The age distribution was 15.9% under the age of 18, 5.3% from 18 to 24, 27.2% from 25 to 44, 22.5% from 45 to 64, and 29.1% 65 or older. The median age was 46 years. For every 100 females, there were 101.3 males. For every 100 females age 18 and over, there were 100.7 males.

The median household income was $28,676 and the median family income was $33,804. Males had a median income of $28,000 versus $17,009 for females. The per capita income for the CDP was $18,613. About 5.3% of families and 5.9% of the population were below the poverty line, including none of those under age 18 and 8.6% of those age 65 or over.

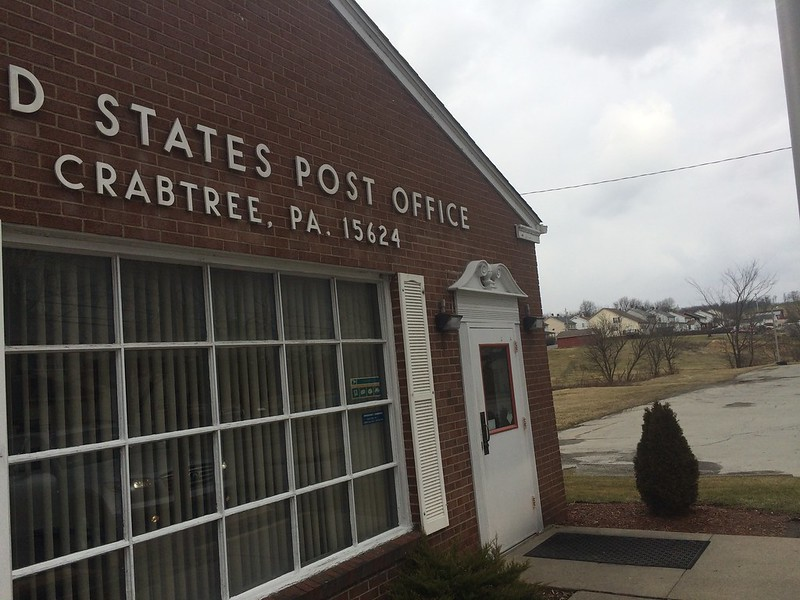
US Post Office, Route 119, Crabtree PA USA
