= Paul Bartholomew =

American architect (1883 - 1973)

Paul Amos Bartholomew
- Born: June 25, 1883; Cleveland, Ohio
- Died: December 8, 1973 (aged 90); Greensburg, Pennsylvania
- Occupation: Architect
- Practice: Solo practitioner, also "Bartholomew & Smith", later "Bartholomew, Roach, Moyer, & Walfish", later "Bartholomew, Roach, & Walfish"
- Buildings: YMCA, Troutman's Department Store, and First National Bank (all in Greensburg, Pennsylvania); Citizens National Bank (Latrobe, Pennsylvania)
- Projects: Design of Norvelt, Pennsylvania

Paul Amos Batholomew (1883–1973) was an architect in Greensburg, Pennsylvania. From the beginning of his practice, he received a variety of high-profile commissions for both residential and non-residential structures, mainly in Westmoreland County, Pennsylvania. His buildings typically had historicist facades, with neoclassical or Italianate ornamentation covering a modern framework. Only in the 1950s, toward the end of his career, he created buildings that were purely modern in design. During the Great Depression, a particularly trying time for architects, he received the commission to design Norvelt, which was a new town created as part of President Roosevelt's New Deal policies.

One of his commissions, the Citizens National Bank of Latrobe of Latrobe, Pennsylvania, designed with partner Brandon Smith, is listed on the National Register of Historic Places. Many of Bartholomew's works are contributing properties to the Greensburg Downtown Historic District and the Academy Hill Historic District.

== Biography ==
Paul Batholomew was born in Cleveland, Ohio on June 25, 1883. His parents were the Rev. Amos H. Bartholomew, a Lutheran minister, and Rachael (Kuhns) Bartholomew. Most of Paul Bartholomew's childhood was spent in Ligonier, Pennsylvania. He graduated from Gettysburg College in 1905, and then studied architecture at the University of Pennsylvania, from which he received a second degree in 1908. After graduation, he worked under architects in Philadelphia and Pittsburgh.

He eventually settled in Greensburg, where he began his practice. Sources differ on the date he started his Greensburg practice; one source claims 1910 although his entry in an architects' directory states he began his practice in 1912. Throughout most of his career, his office was in the Coulter Building at 231 South Main Street in Greensburg. However, two 1929 publications list an office in the Keenan Building, Pittsburgh.

Paul Bartholomew married Dorothy W. Lyon, a Greensburg resident, on November 1, 1916. Paul Bartholomew died on December 8, 1973, at the age of 90.

== Partnership with Smith ==
Bartholomew formed a partnership with Brandon Smith (1889–1962), although sources differ on the year the partnership began. One source claims the partnership commenced in 1915, while Bartholomew's entry in an architects' directory states it began in 1920. In any event, the firm of Bartholomew & Smith was dissolved in 1928 when Smith left to form a firm, Smith & Reif.

== Notable commissions ==
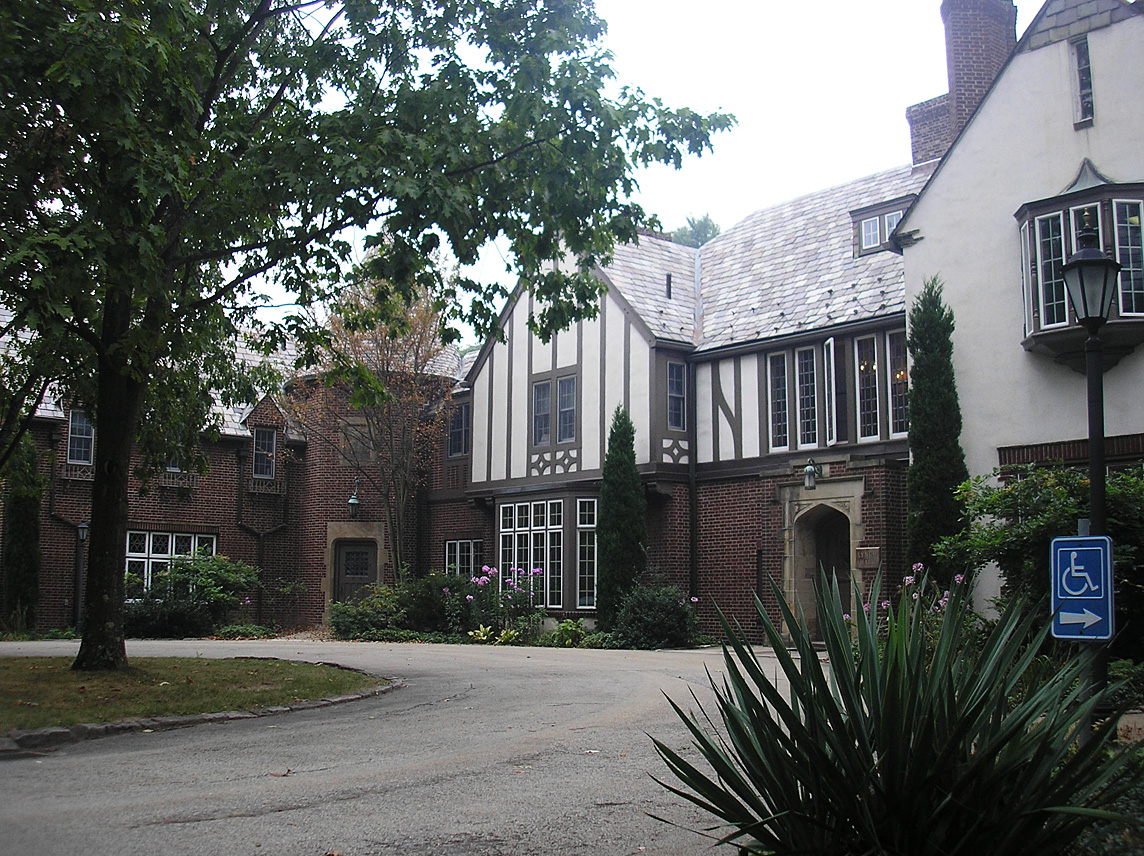
Lynch Hall (1923, 1965) at the University of Pittsburgh at Greensburg

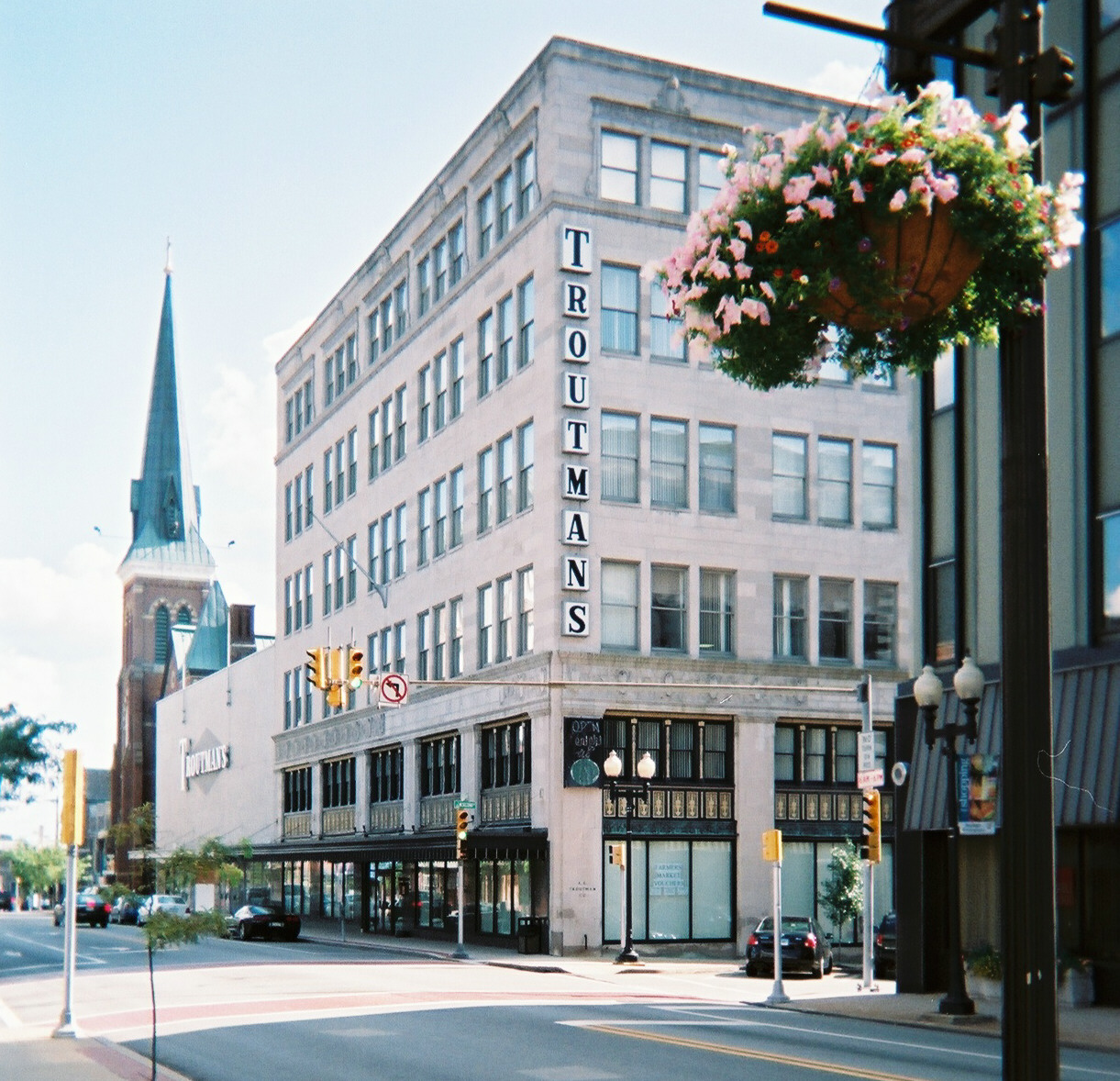
Troutman's Department Store (1923)

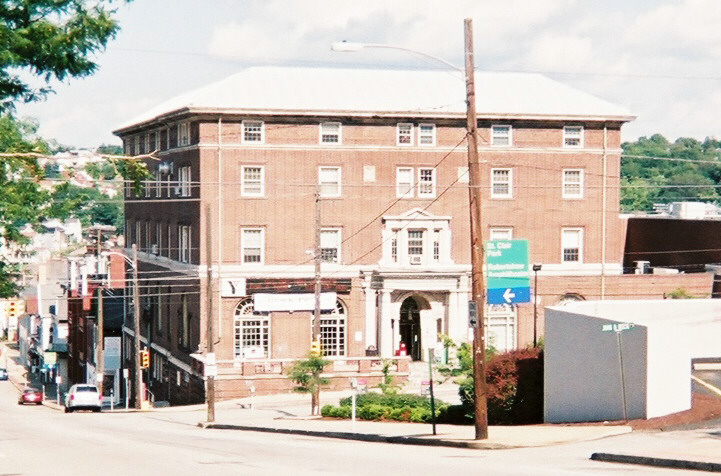
Greensburg YMCA (1912)

Among Bartholomew's commissions were the following:

- Houses in Academy Hill, Greensburg: The Academy Hill Historic District was created by the National Park Service, in part, to recognize the houses Bartholomew designed in this traditionally elite neighborhood. (Year of construction is in parentheses.) On North Main Street, he designed numbers 419 (1935), 431 (1920), 445 (1913), and 450 (1920). On North Maple Avenue, he designed numbers 528 (1913) and 552 (1922). On Walnut Avenue, he designed number 334 (1936). On Kenneth Street, he designed numbers 208 (1920) & 214 (1937). On Woodland Avenue, he designed number 44 (1946). He designed 208, his residence from 1920 until he died in 1973.

The remaining items are in chronological order:

- Greensburg YMCA (1912): Located at 101 South Maple Avenue (corner of East Pittsburgh Street), in Greensburg, Pennsylvania, this 1912 structure is a four-story red brick building with Classical elements. This was Bartholomew's first major non-residential commission. The third and fourth floors consisted of rooms that could be rented, and that part of the building became a residence for older men of limited means. The second floor had meeting rooms, and the main floor had a lobby, gym, and residents' lounge. The basement had a swimming pool, weight room, and locker rooms. There was a sub-basement for mechanical equipment. Over the years, the building has undergone significant renovations. Nonetheless, the exterior has hardly changed, except for a 1969 addition on the south side of the building to house a new pool.
- Troutman's Department Store (1923): Located in Greensburg, this is a six-story Italianate structure with a limestone and terracotta facade built in 1923. The building still stands at 202-226 South Main Street. Although the interior has been gutted and converted into offices and seniors' housing, the exterior remains unchanged and in excellent condition.
- Lynch Hall (1923): This Tudor-style mansion was built in 1923 for Charles McKenna Lynch (1884–1963), an executive of the H.C. Frick Coke Company. The house's original name was Starboard Light, in reference to Lynch's earlier career as a naval officer. Its current street address is 150 Finoli Drive, Greensburg, Pennsylvania (actually located in Hempfield Township), where it serves as the administrative building for University of Pittsburgh at Greensburg.
- First Commonwealth Bank (1924): Originally known as First National Bank and later as Southwest Bank, this seven-story red brick building is in a Classical Revival style, built in 1924 at 111 South Main Street, Greensburg. The firm of Bartholomew & Smith were the architects.
- Citizens National Bank of Latrobe (1926): This is in nearby Latrobe, where it is the tallest building of that city. It is located at 816 Ligonier Street (corner of Main Street) in Latrobe. This six-story Classical Revival structure has a bank on the ground floor and offices on the upper floors. It was later known as the Mellon Bank Building. The architects were the firm of Bartholomew & Smith, and the building is listed in the National Register of Historic Places.
- Fort Jackson Hotel (1926): This three-story, red brick structure at 19 South Washington Street in Waynesburg, Pennsylvania was designed by the firm of Bartholomew & Smith. It was originally a hotel and was later converted into offices.
- Beta Theta Pi Fraternity House (1929): This 1929 building is still in use as a fraternity house at 220 North Burrowes Street, State College, Pennsylvania.
- Community of Norvelt, Pennsylvania, originally Westmoreland Homesteads (1934–1937): This planned community in Mount Pleasant Township, Westmoreland County, Pennsylvania, was built by the federal government during the Great Depression as one of 92 "subsistence homesteads" intended to address rural poverty. Paul Bartholomew received the commission to lay out the plan of streets, which he did in a nontraditional pattern of circles and semicircles. The layout was quite spacious, with large lots, and it was intended that laid-off mine workers could raise their food. He also designed over 200 Cape Cod-style houses for the community and its public buildings. Land acquisition began in 1934, and the formal dedication, attended by Eleanor Roosevelt, was held on May 21, 1937. The community's name was changed from Westmoreland Homesteads to Norvelt in her honor. Although the individual buildings have been remodeled over the intervening years, a visitor can still gain a good sense of what the community was like when it opened.
- Zions Lutheran Church (Renovations) (1937 and 1951): This church is located at 146 South Pennsylvania Avenue (at West Second Street), Greensburg, Pennsylvania. The current structure dates from 1877, although Paul Bartholomew was responsible for renovations in 1937 and 1951. His father had once been pastor of this church.
- Laufe House (1953): This was built at 949 Summit Drive in Greensburg, Pennsylvania, for Mr. and Mrs. Joseph H. Laufe. Paul Bartholomew was listed as the architect, and Herbert Walfish, later a partner of Bartholomew, was listed as a "designer." This is a scarce example of modern architecture of Paul Bartholomew, who almost always preferred facades with a historical flavor. This two-bedroom house is one story with a basement and has large windows across the back. The exterior consists of redwood and brick, and many interior walls consist of brick and polished wood.
- Excela Westmoreland Hospital Addition (1953): Originally Westmoreland Hospital, the street address is 532 West Pittsburgh Street, Greensburg, Pennsylvania. This complex is an assortment of various additions; Paul Bartholomew was responsible for the 1953 component of this building, with James H. Ritchie and Associates of Boston as associate architects.

== See also ==
- Academy Hill Historic District
- Greensburg Downtown Historic District
- Greensburg, Pennsylvania
- Norvelt, Pennsylvania

== Gallery ==
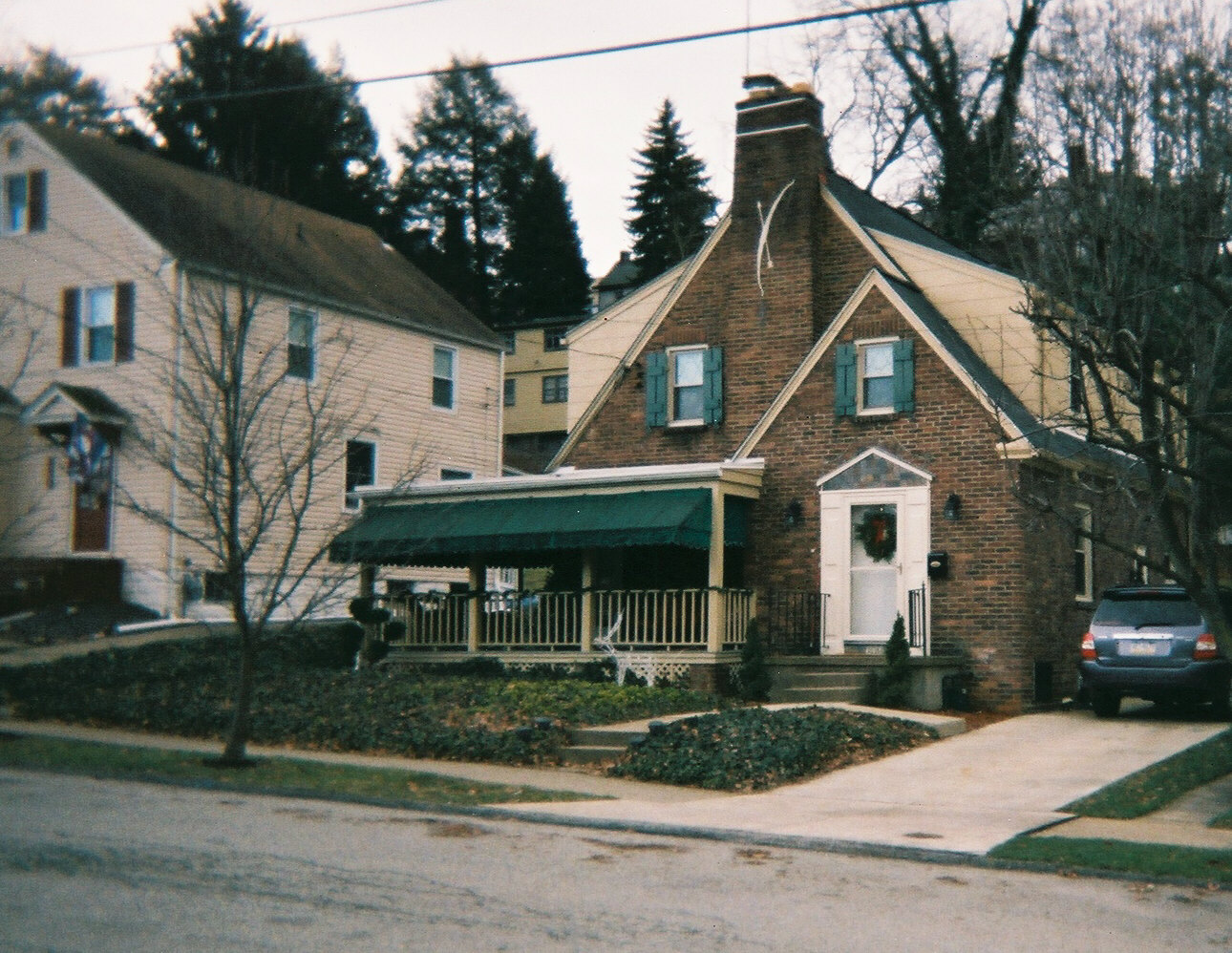
334 Walnut Avenue (1936)

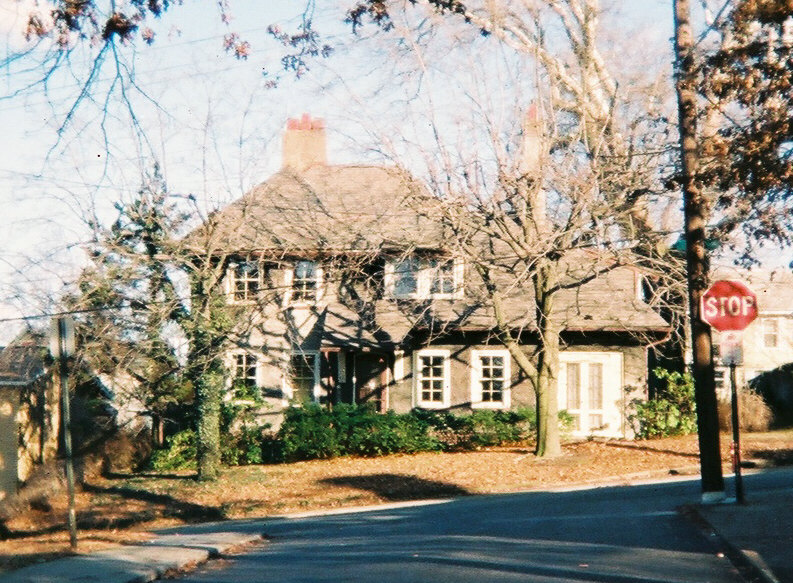
431 North Main Street (1920)

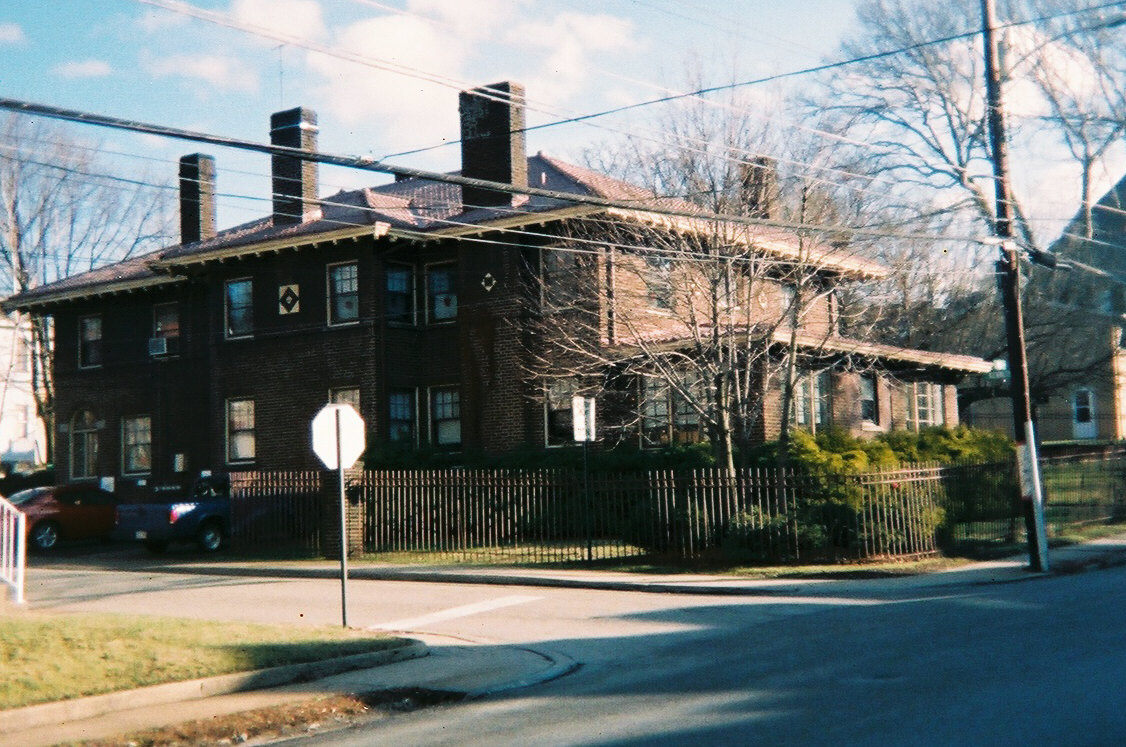
445 North Main Street (1913)

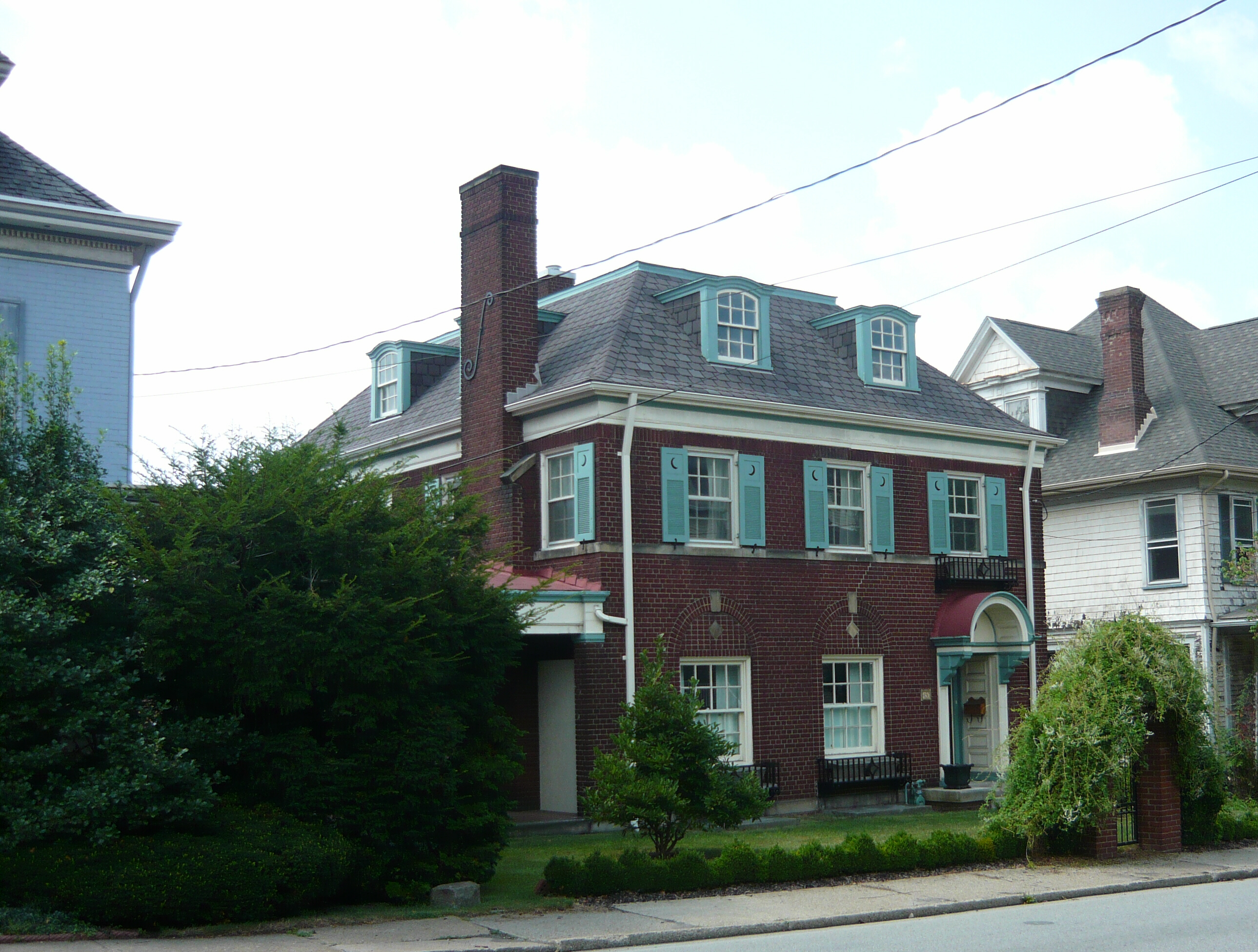
450 North Main Street (1920)

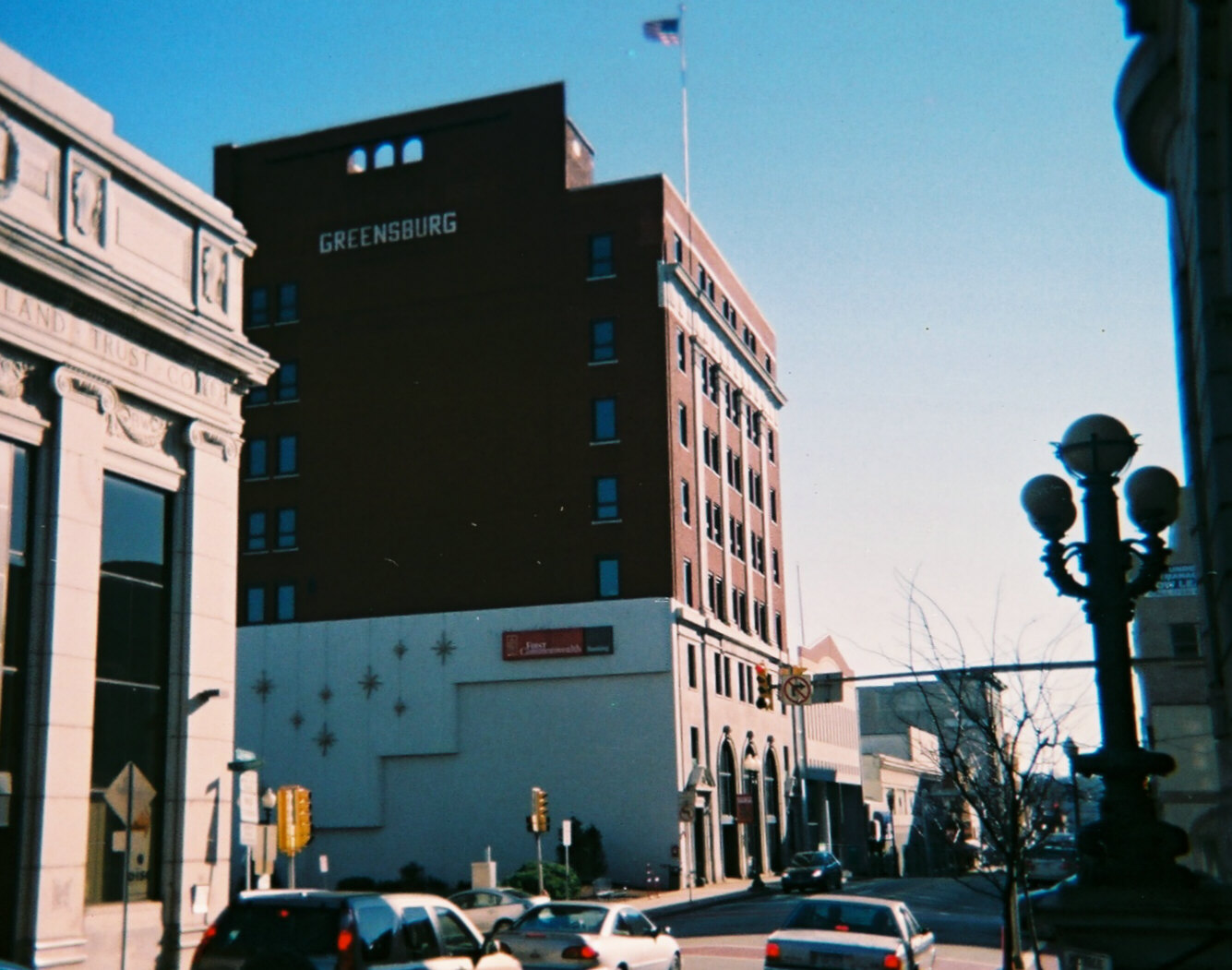
First Commonwealth Bank (1924)

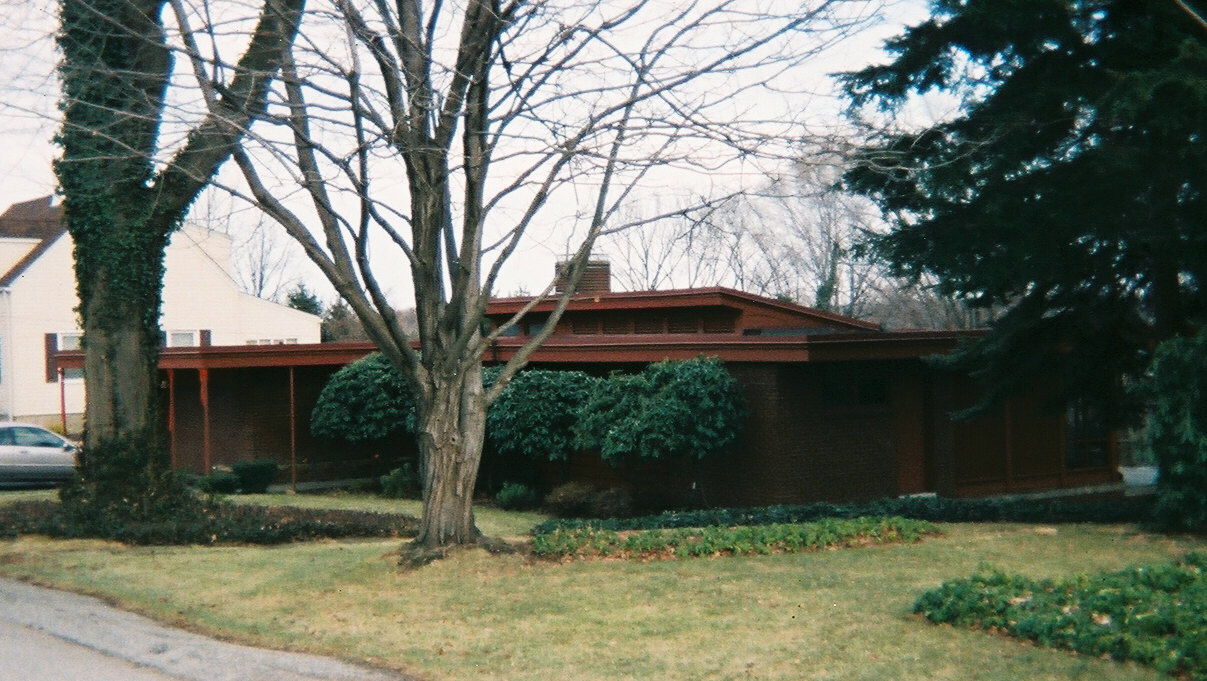
Laufe House (1953)
949 Summit Drive

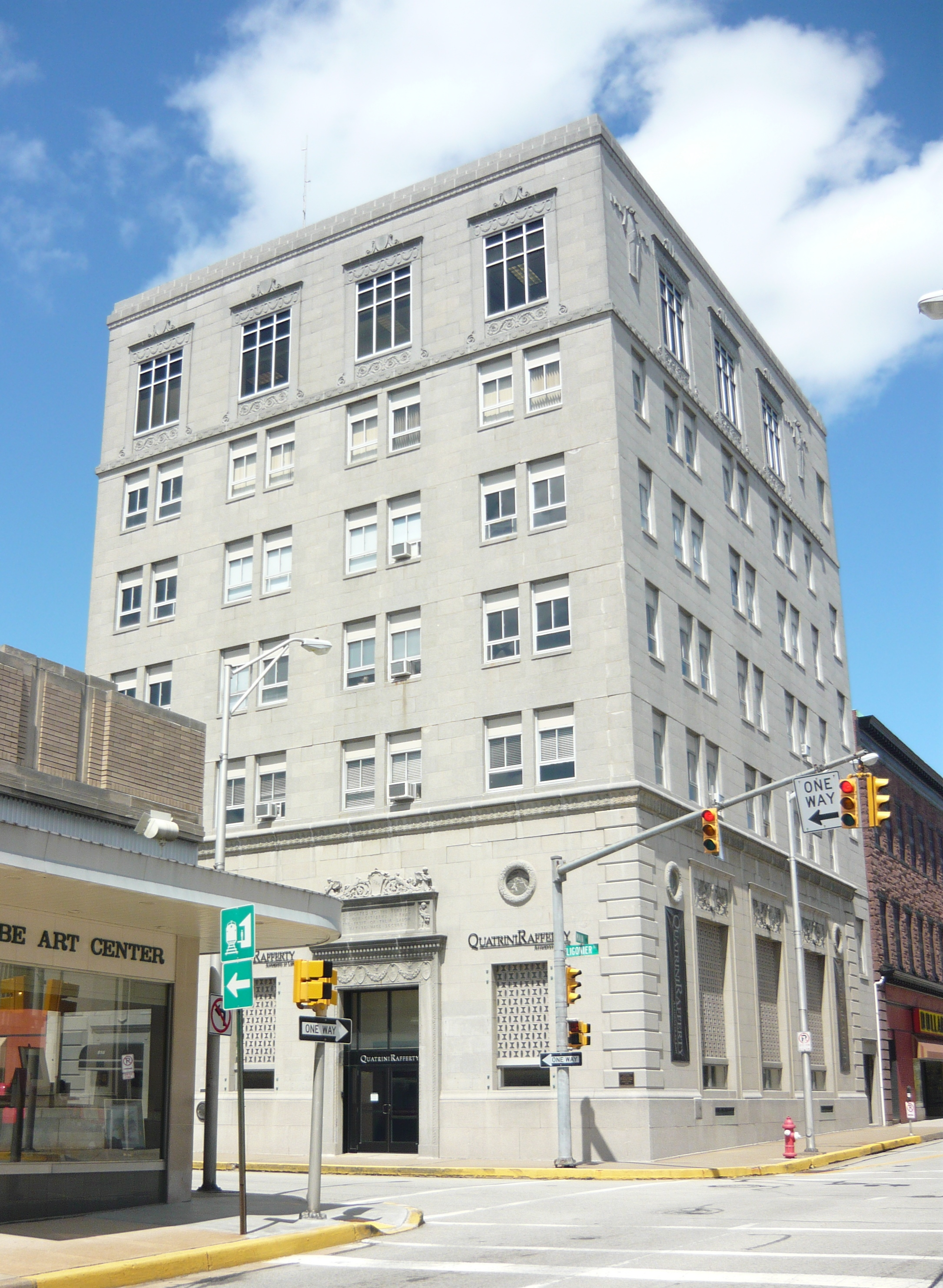
Citizens National Bank (1926)
Latrobe, Pennsylvania

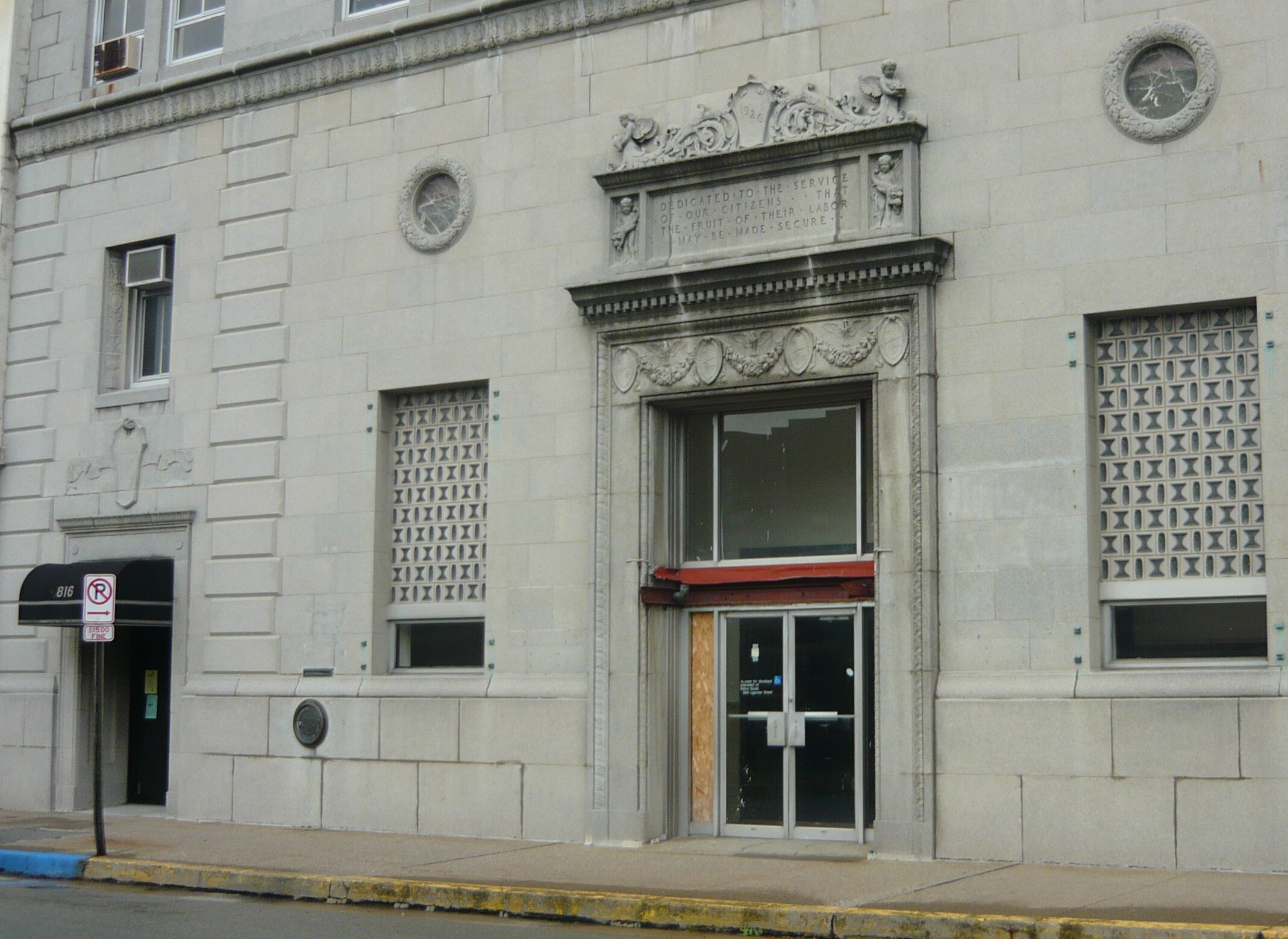
Detail of Citizens National Bank (1926)
Latrobe, Pennsylvania
