= Academy Hill Historic District (Greensburg, Pennsylvania) =

Historic district in Pennsylvania, United States

- U.S. National Register of Historic Places
- U.S. Historic district
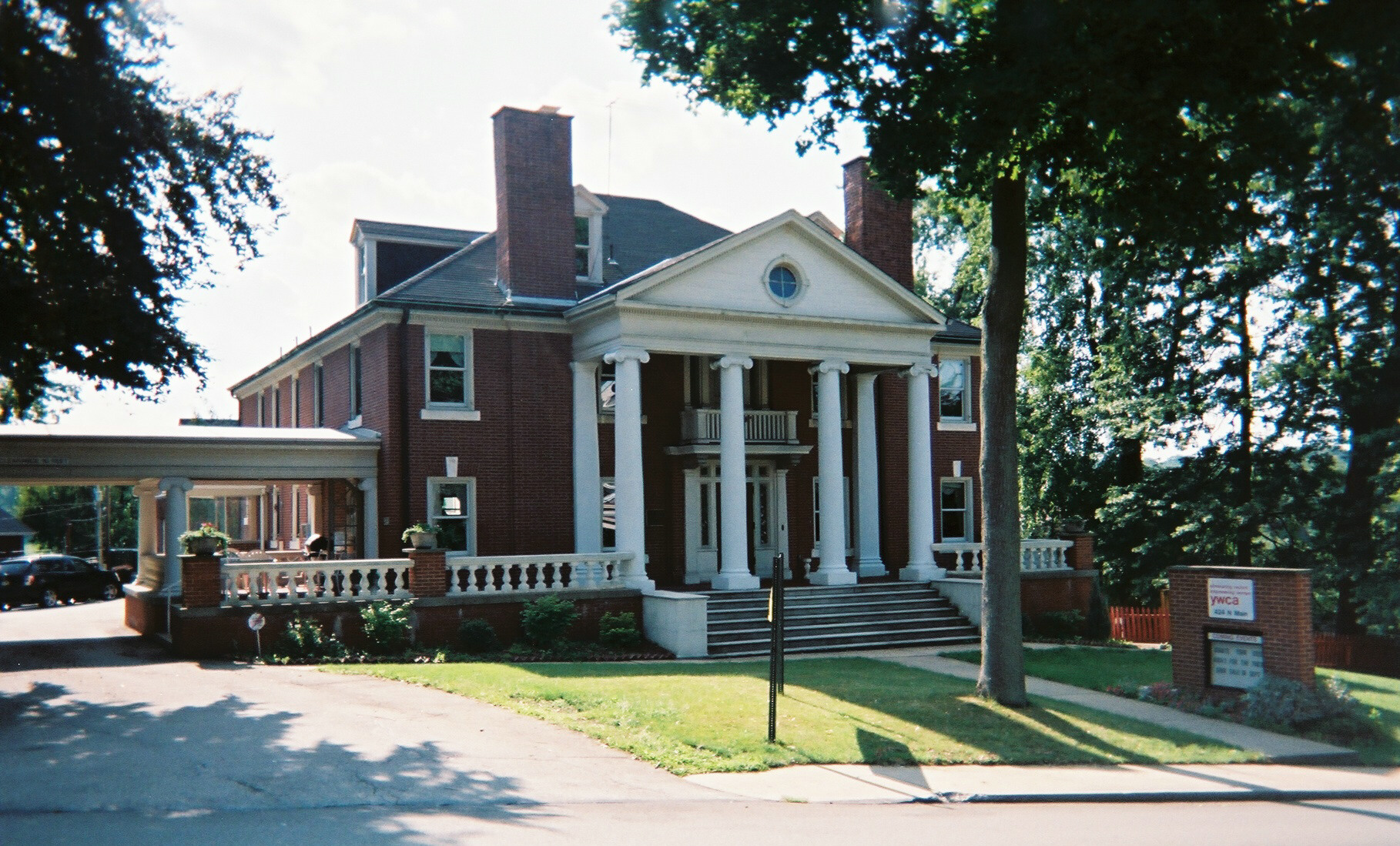
- Huff Mansion / YWCA (1900)

- Location within Pennsylvania
- Location: Greensburg, Pennsylvania
- Coordinates: 40°18′39″N 79°32′42″W
- Area: 63.5 acres (25.7 ha)
- NRHP reference No.: 99000516
- Added to NRHP: April 29, 1999

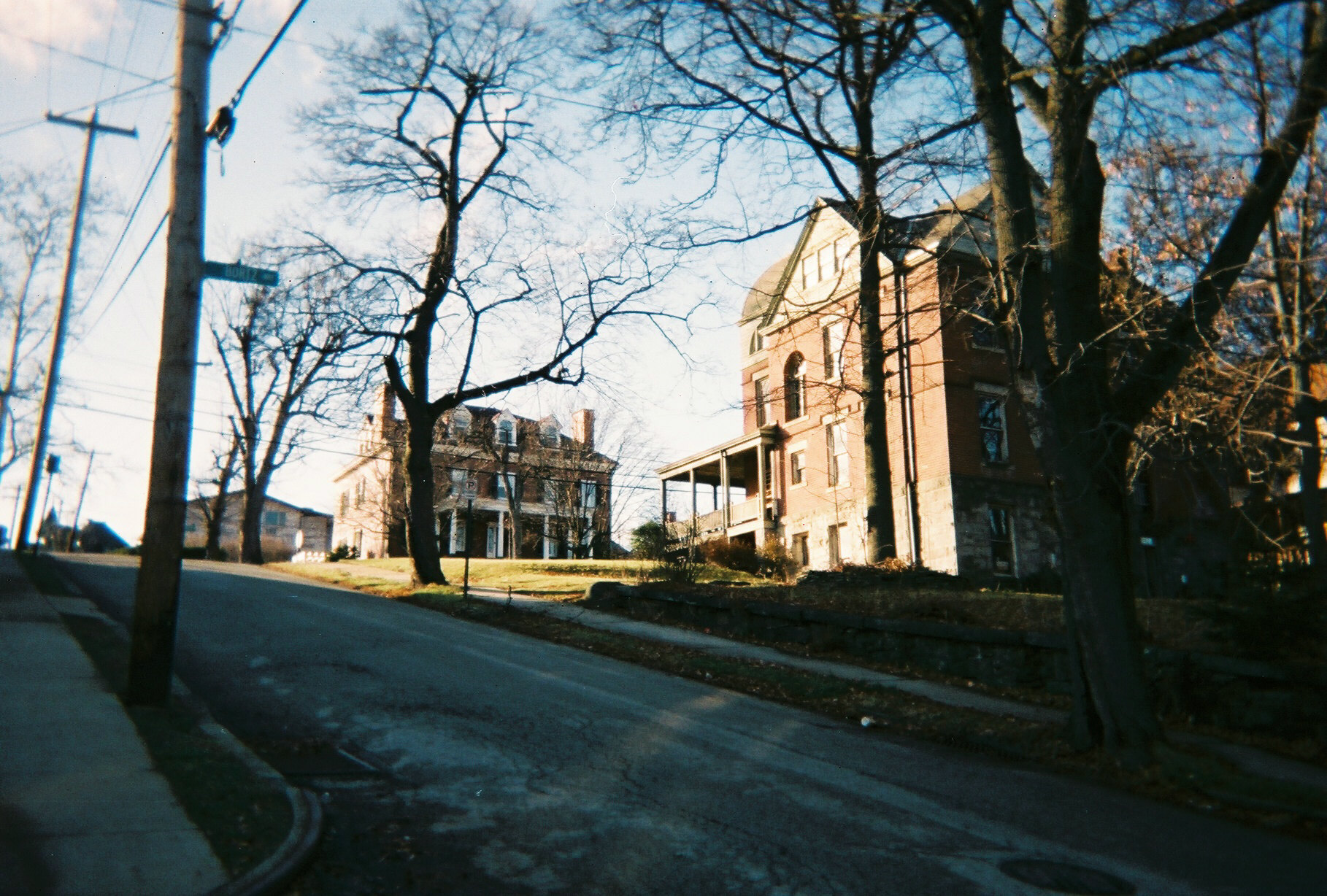
Houses on North Maple Avenue Foreground: 403 North Maple (Built 1894) Background: 404 North Maple (Built 1907)

The Academy Hill Historic District of Greensburg, Pennsylvania, is bounded approximately by Baughman Street, North Maple Avenue, Kenneth Street, Culbertson Avenue, Beacon Street, and North Main Street. It consists of 252 structures on 63.5 acres (0.257 km^{2}), with the most notable buildings from the years 1880 to 1949. The earliest building, a former farmhouse at 333 Walnut Avenue, dates from 1840. The Academy Hill Historic District is directly to the north of the Greensburg Downtown Historic District.

The southern portion of Academy Hill is mainly institutional, including the Blessed Sacrament Cathedral, its parish school, and Greensburg's public high school, now used as a middle school. Since 1810, the block bounded by Main Street, Academy Hill Place, Maple Avenue, and Grant Street has been used for a succession of public schools, and the 1810 school at this site was the source of the neighborhood's name.

Main Street, north of these landmark structures, is lined with large houses and mansions built for the city's elite, some designed by Paul Bartholomew. As one moves east of Main Street, the houses become less elaborate. The north-south streets east of Maple Avenue are lined with relatively modest houses representing middle-class and working-class residential architecture in the pre-World War II era.

== Notable buildings by street ==
=== Grant Street ===
- 133 Grant Street - Sears, the department store chain, once sold houses in kit form that could be ordered through the mail, and such houses were particularly popular with farmers on the prairies. This is an example of such a Sears Catalog Home, which is rare for Greensburg. It was built in 1925 and represents the American Craftsman style.
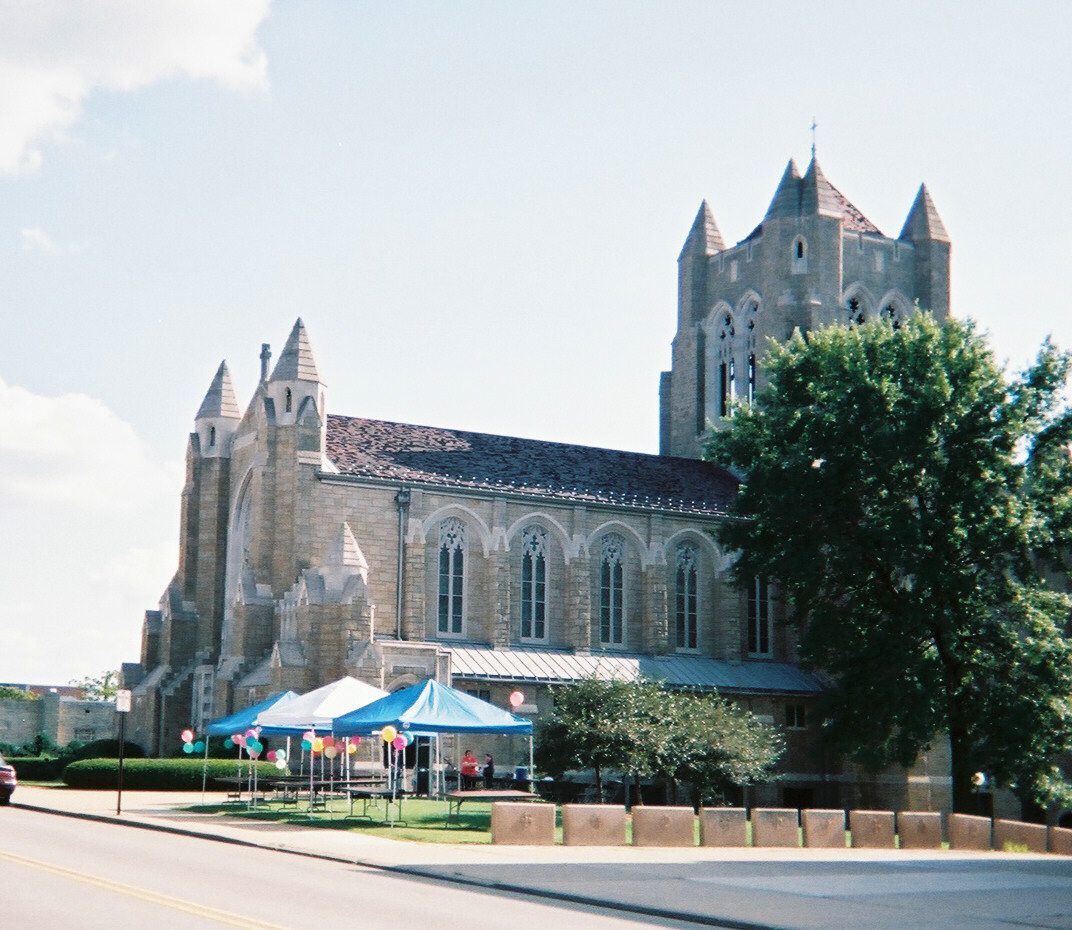
  Blessed Sacrament Cathedral (1928)

=== Kenneth Street ===
- 208 Kenneth Street - This 1920 Tudor was designed by and was the residence for Paul Bartholomew until he died in 1973.
- 214 Kenneth Street - This 1937 center hall colonial was designed by Paul Bartholomew.

=== North Main Street ===
In order by house number:

- Blessed Sacrament Cathedral (300 North Main Street) - This massive 1928 structure serves as the seat of the Roman Catholic Diocese of Greensburg. It was designed by the Pittsburgh-based firm of Comes, Perry, and McMullen in an English Gothic style. Initially, it was the Blessed Sacrament Church and attained cathedral status when the Diocese of Greensburg was formed in 1952. The German artist Franz Maier designed the stained glass rose window over the main entrance. Between 1983 and 1987, the architectural firm of Celli & Flynn Associates conducted a major renovation of the structure.
- Greensburg Salem Middle School (301 North Main Street) - A public school, known as the Academy Hill School, was built on this site in 1810, from which the neighborhood takes its name. It was destroyed by fire in 1850. A second school, known as "Old Red" (a two-story red brick building), was built here in 1862 or 1863 and torn down in 1924. Slightly to the north of the existing building, a high school was built in 1897 but was razed in 1960. The current building is the fourth school on this block. It is a three-story structure, opened in 1927, and was designed by architect Maurice Kressely in a Neoclassical Revival style. This current structure was initially the Greensburg Salem High School, and since 1979 has been the Greensburg Salem Middle School.
- Aquinas Academy (340 North Main Street) - This is the parish elementary school of the next-door Blessed Sacrament Cathedral. It was originally known as Saint Benedict School, then as Blessed Sacrament School, until 1995, when its name was changed to Aquinas Academy due to a reorganization of the diocesan elementary schools. The oldest portion of the building, fronting Main Street, is a two-story red brick structure from 1904. There are also 1954 and 1961 additions, both fronting on Pennsylvania Avenue. A 1962 addition, set back from Main Street, was intended to serve as a convent.
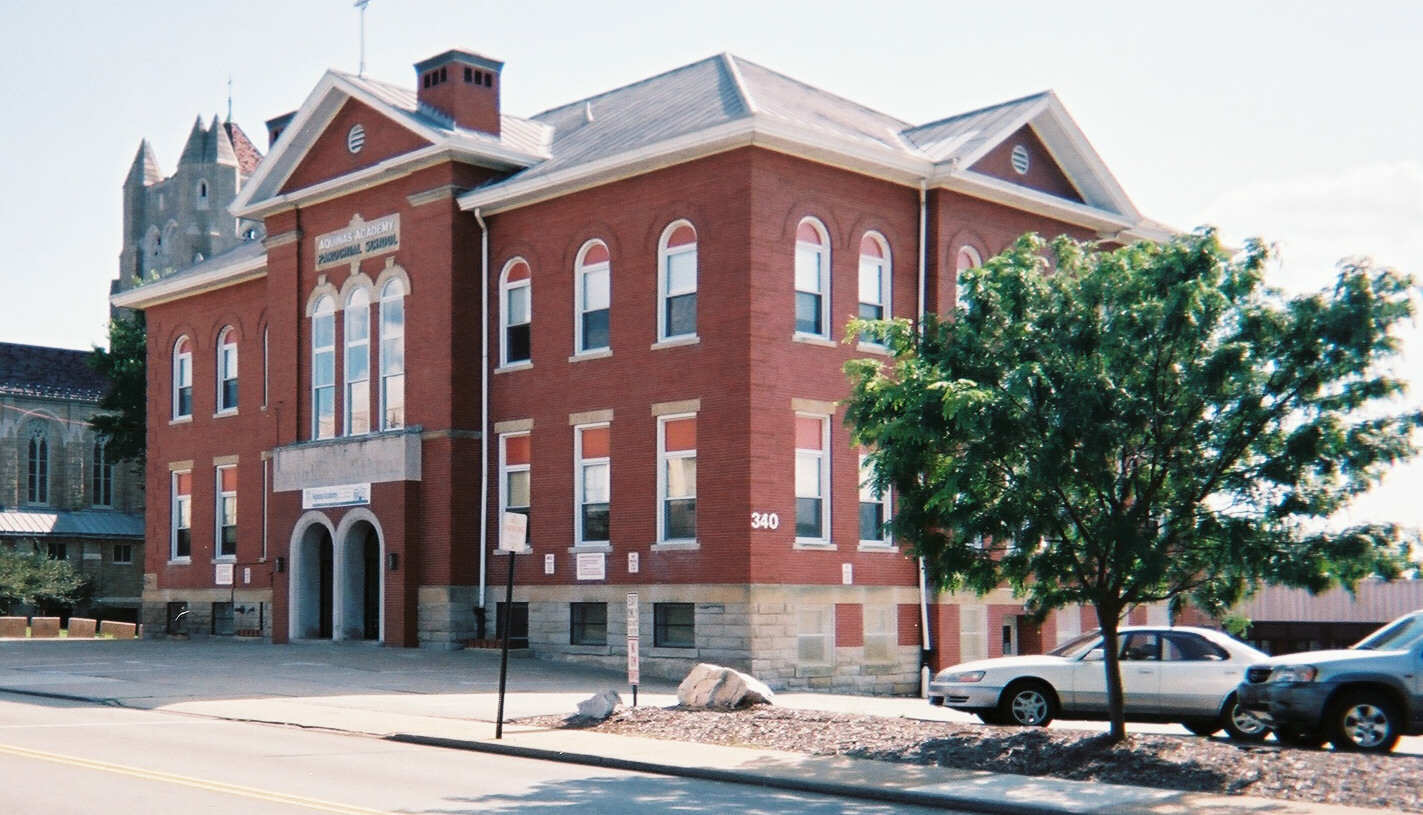
  Aquinas Academy (1904)
- 419 North Main Street - This 1935 Tudor Revival residence is one of many in the neighborhood by architect Paul Bartholomew.
- Huff Mansion / YWCA (424 North Main Street) - Perhaps the grandest of the Academy Hill mansions, the YWCA has owned this 1900 Georgian Revival structure since 1979. It was designed by Boston-based architect Ralph Adams Cram for William A. Huff, whose wealth originated from the coal industry (United Coal and Coke Company) and from banking (First National Bank of Greensburg).
- 431 North Main Street - This 1920 house is another commission by architect Paul Bartholomew, characterized by influences of the Prairie School, the Picturesque Movement, and the Craftsman style.
- 445 North Main Street - This 1913 Mission style house was designed by Paul Bartholomew.
- 450 North Main Street - This 1920 house was designed by Paul Bartholomew in a Georgian Revival style.
- Kepple-Graft Funeral Home (524 North Main Street) - This was built for William Jamison, a coal industry magnate.

=== North Maple Avenue ===
In order by house number:

- Clawson House (223 North Maple Avenue) - This Queen Anne style house was built in 1893 for Sheriff Lucien Clawson.
- 528 North Maple Avenue - This 1913 home was designed by Paul Bartholomew in a Craftsman style.
- 552 North Maple Avenue - This 1922 residence is yet another design by Paul Bartholomew, reflecting an Eclectic Revival design.

=== O'Hara Street ===
- YWCA Annex (12 O'Hara Street) - This structure was a log cabin at 419 North Main Street. At the time of World War I, the Huff family moved it to its current location as a wedding gift for William A. Huff's daughter. The house was later covered in stucco, a very unusual building material in this region, and currently serves as an annex for the YWCA.

=== Walnut Avenue ===
In order by house number:

- 333 Walnut Avenue - This 1840 structure was originally a farmhouse and is the oldest building in the historic district.
- 334 Walnut Avenue - This 1936 Tudor Revival style residence was designed by Paul Bartholomew.

== See also ==
- Greensburg Downtown Historic District
- Greensburg, Pennsylvania
- National Register of Historic Places listings in Westmoreland County, Pennsylvania
- Paul Bartholomew
- Westmoreland County, Pennsylvania

== Gallery ==
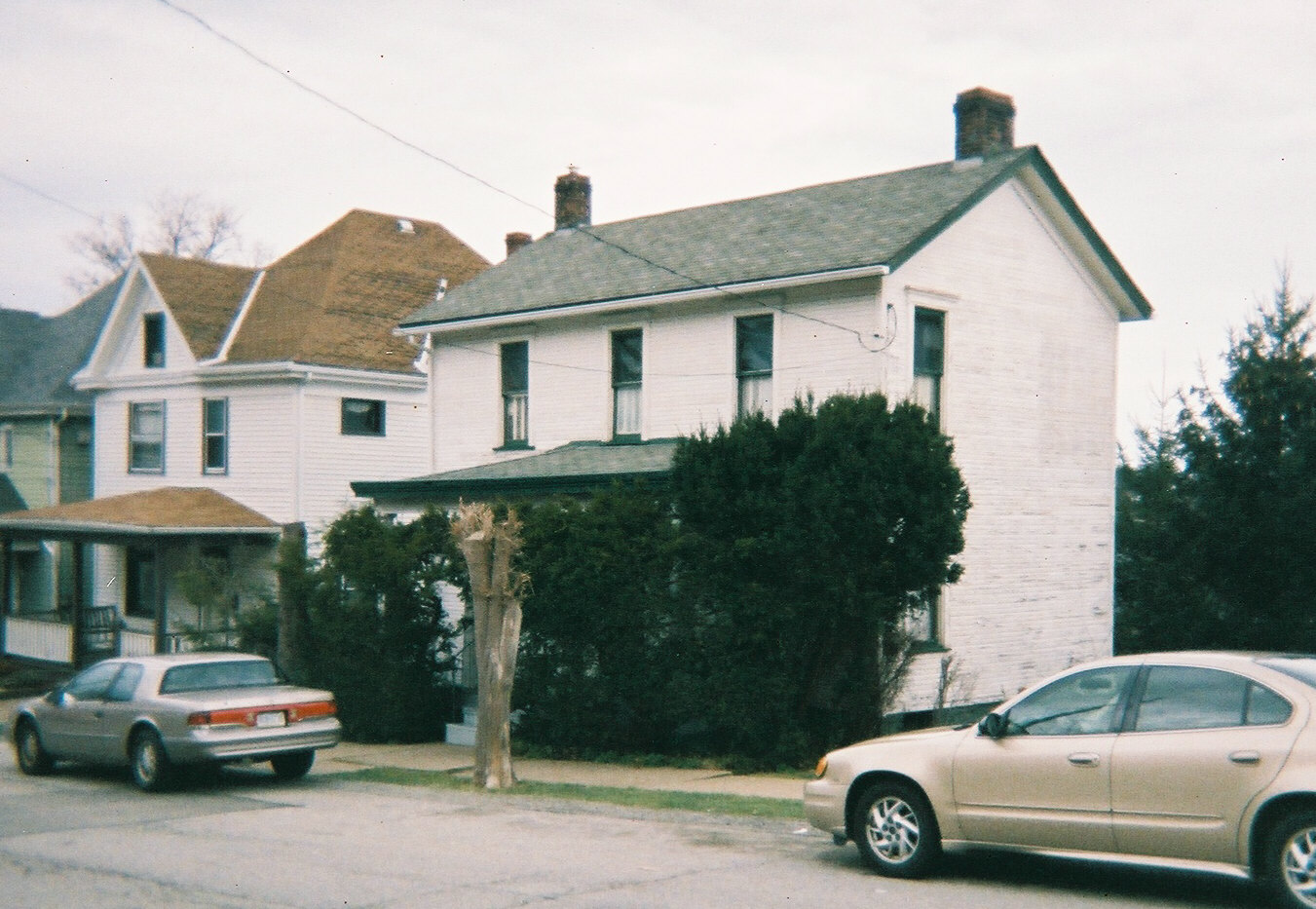
333 Walnut Avenue (1840)
Oldest structure in the historic district

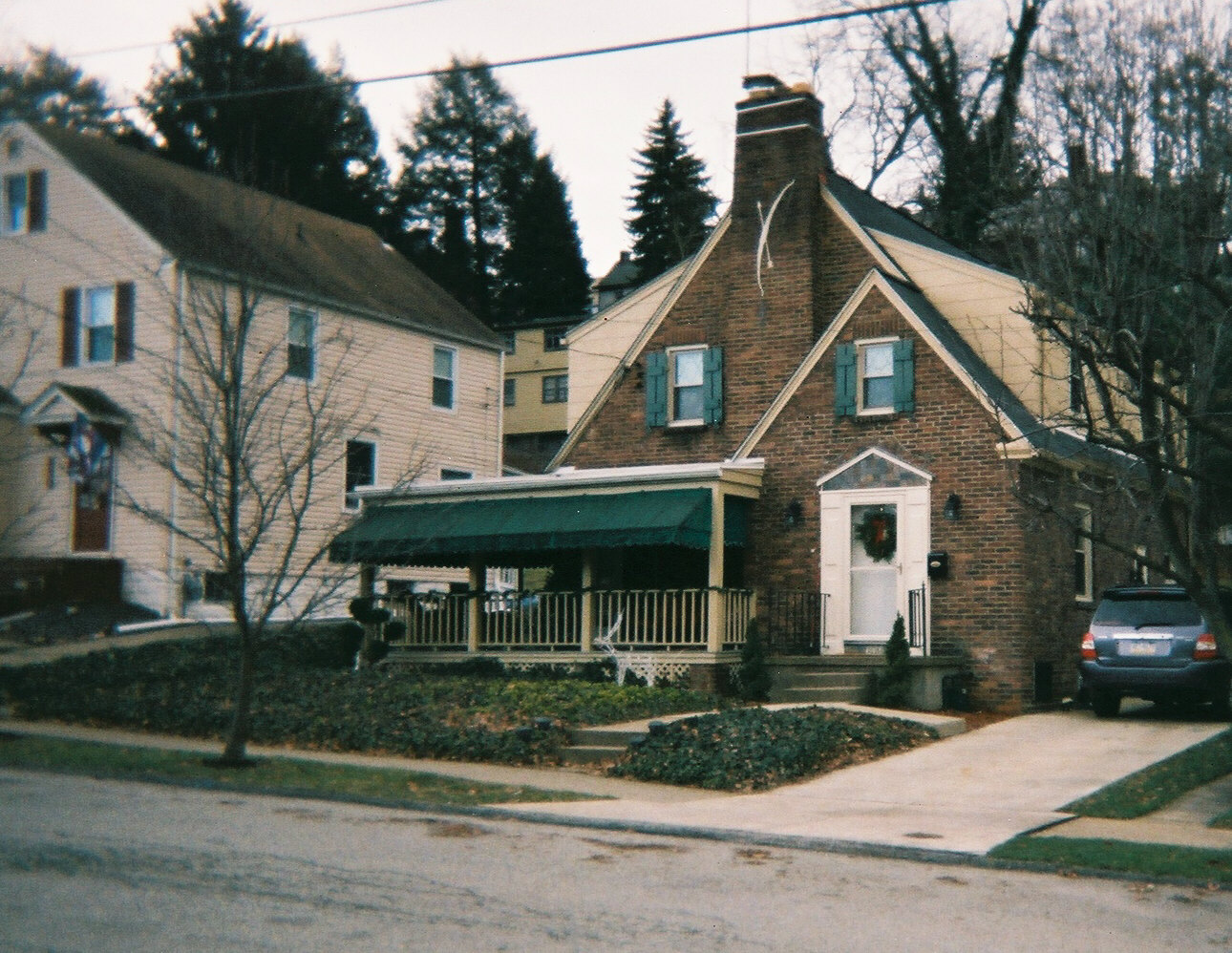
334 Walnut Avenue (1936)

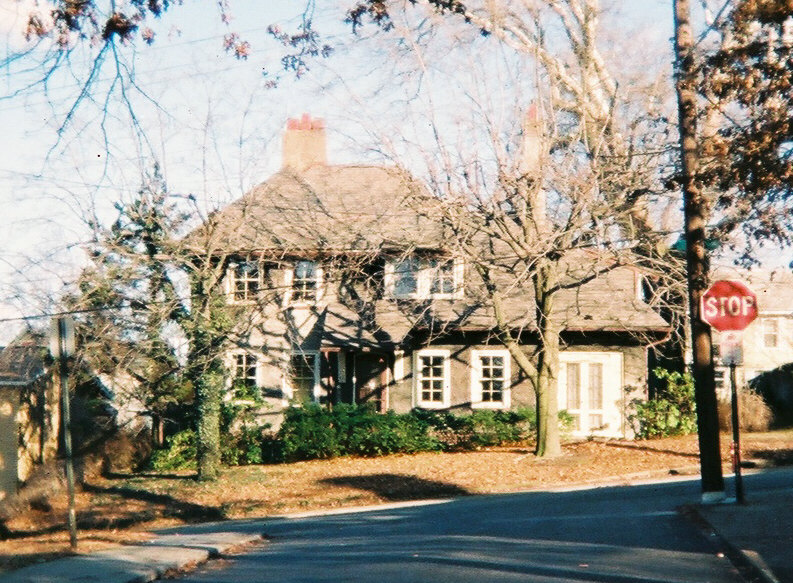
431 North Main Street (1920)

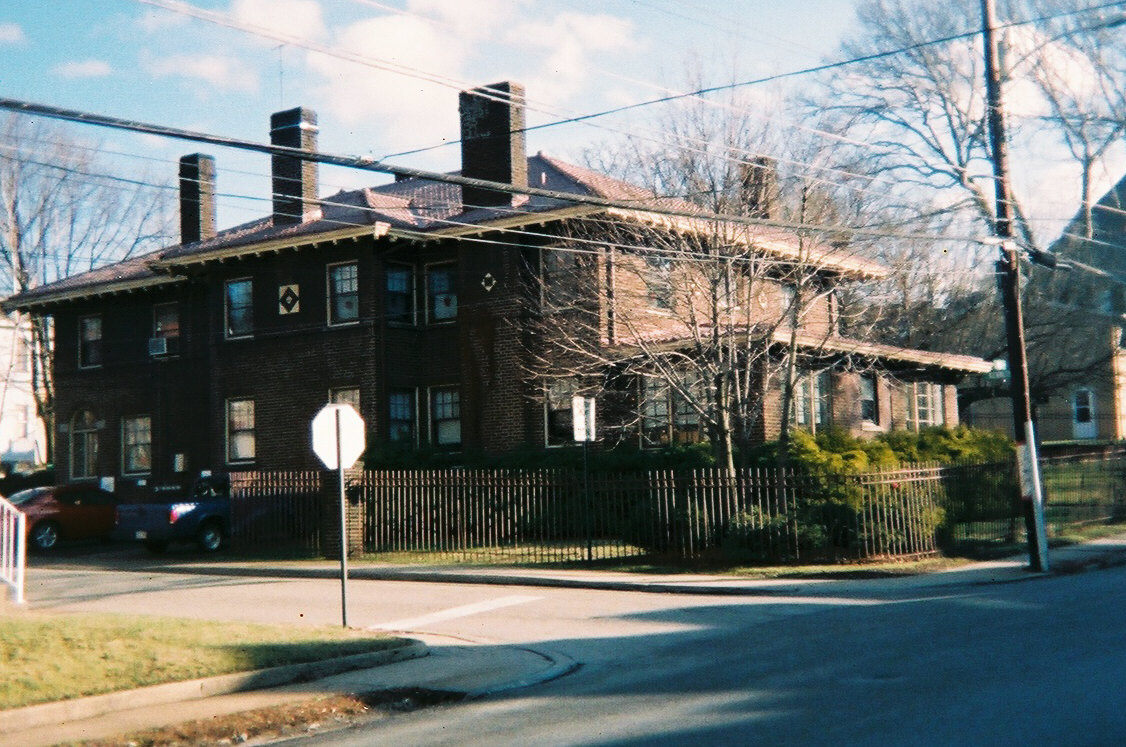
445 North Main Street (1913)

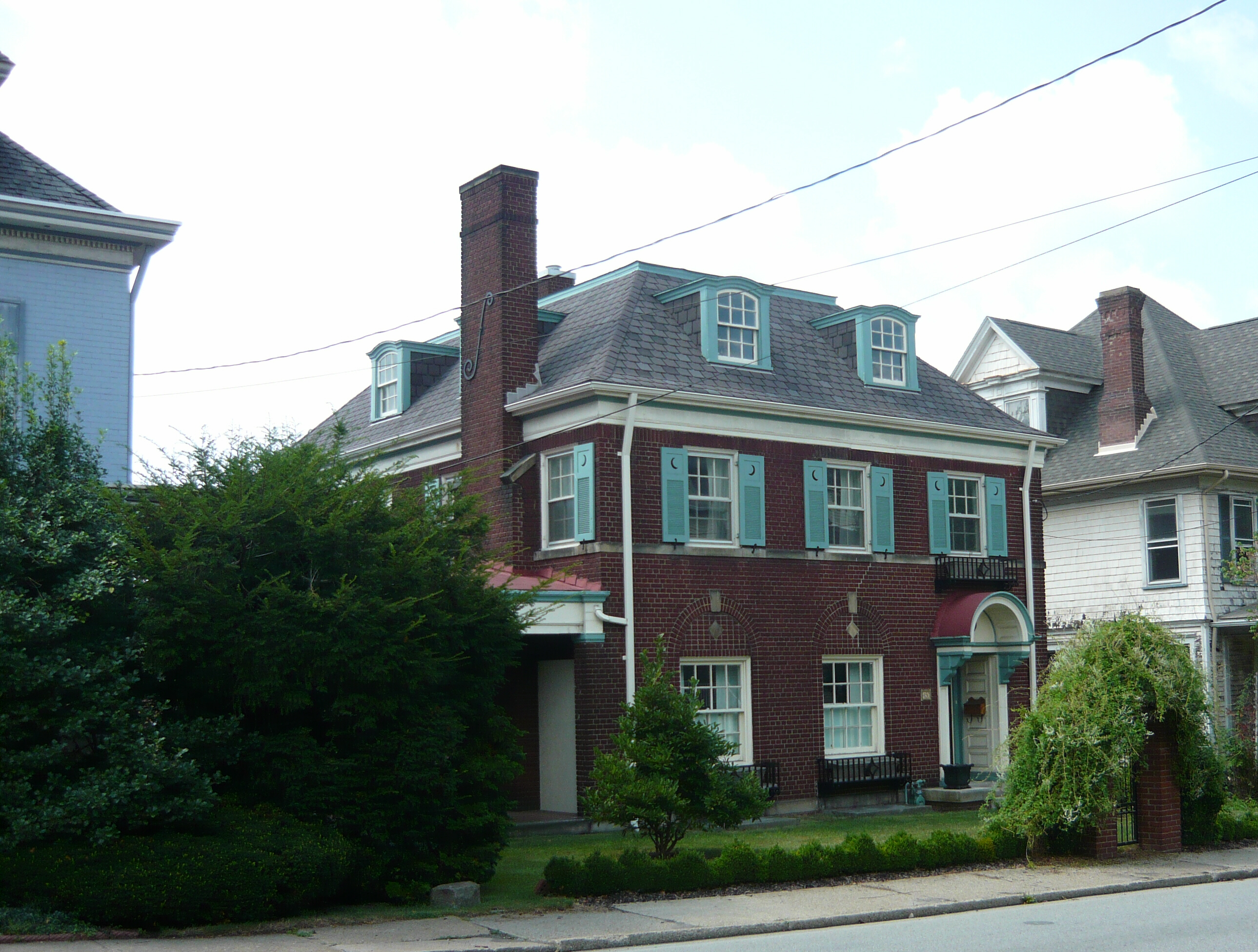
450 North Main Street (1920)

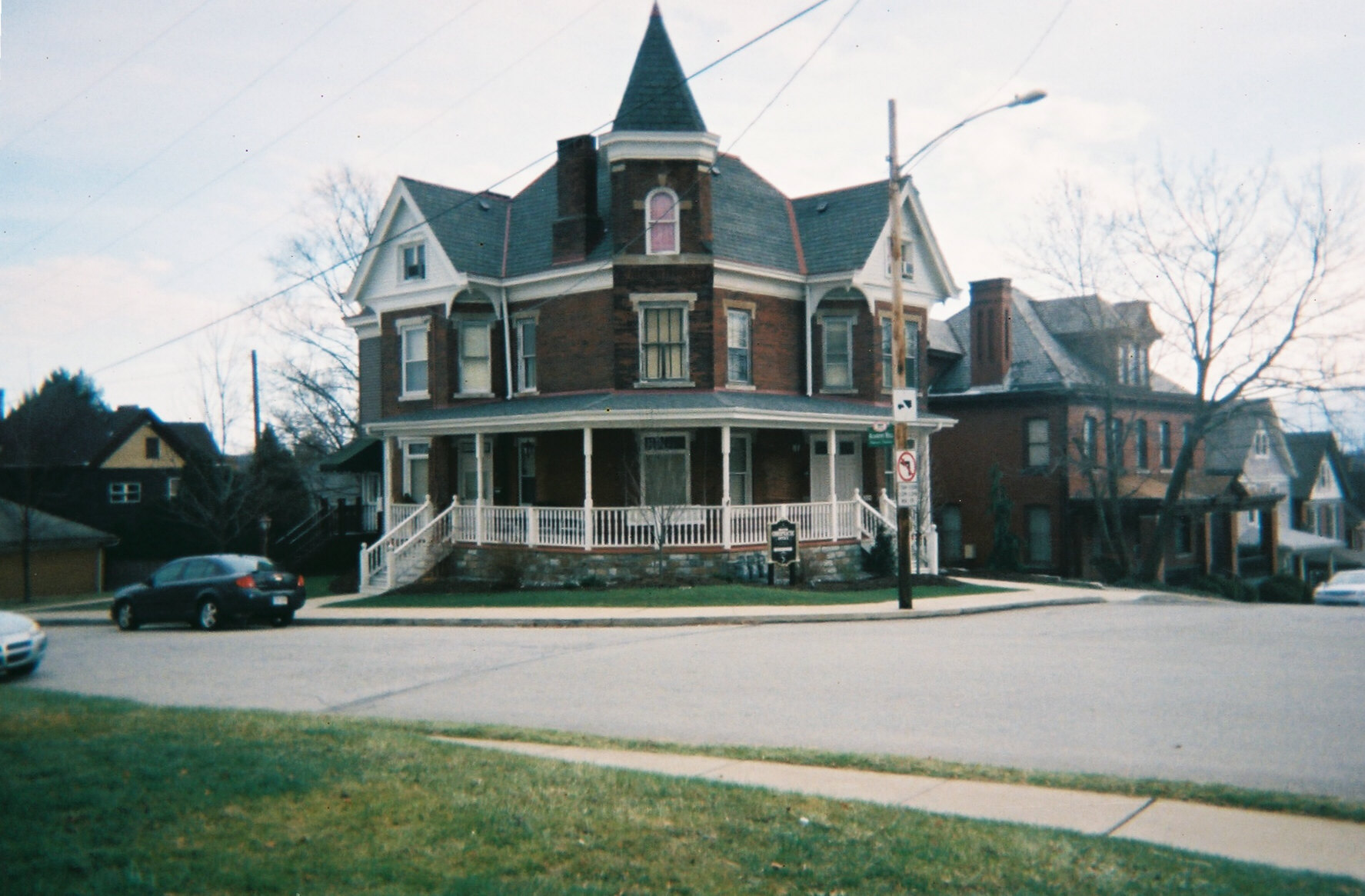
Clawson House (1893)
223 North Maple Avenue

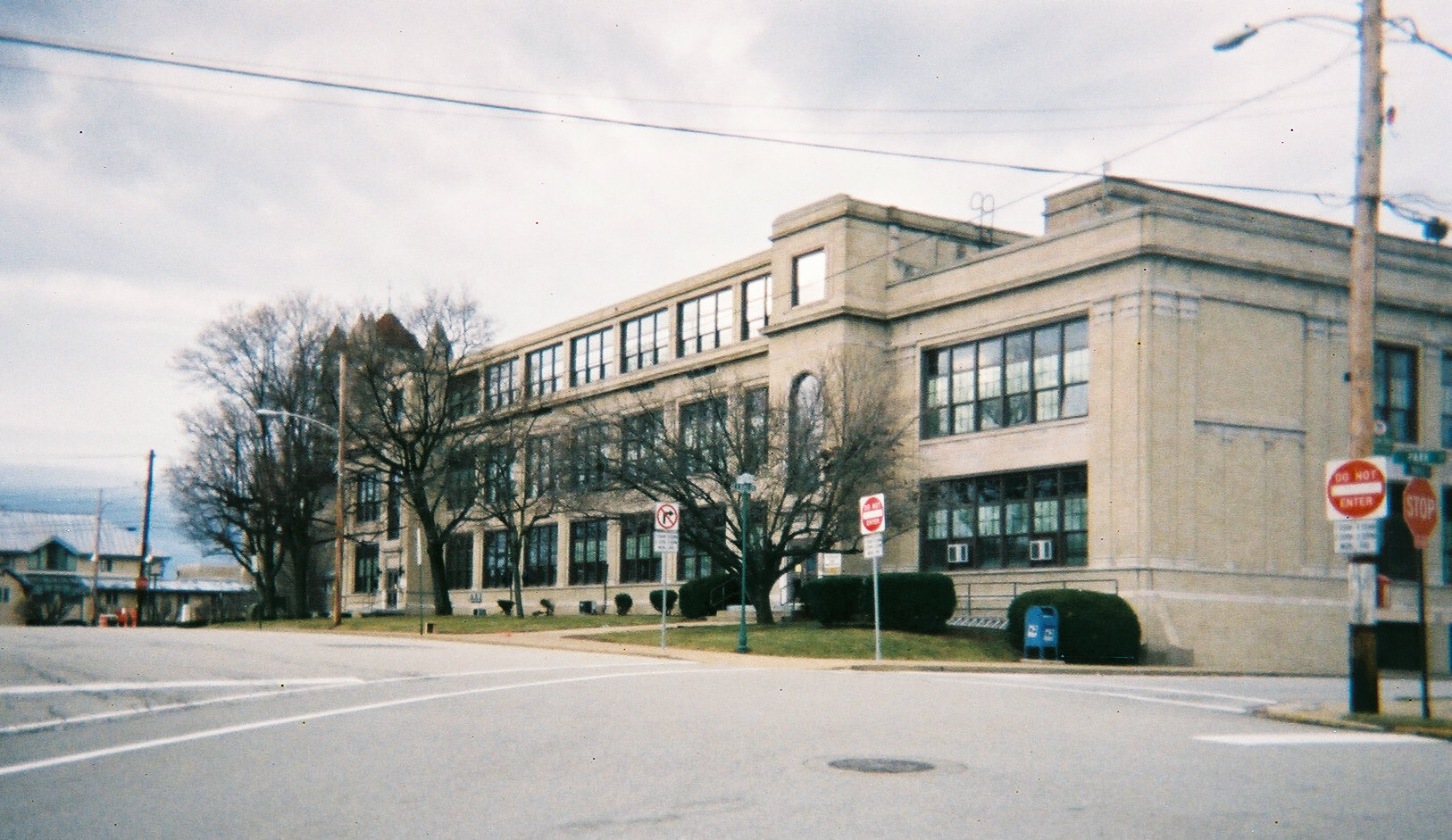
Greensburg Salem Middle School (1927)

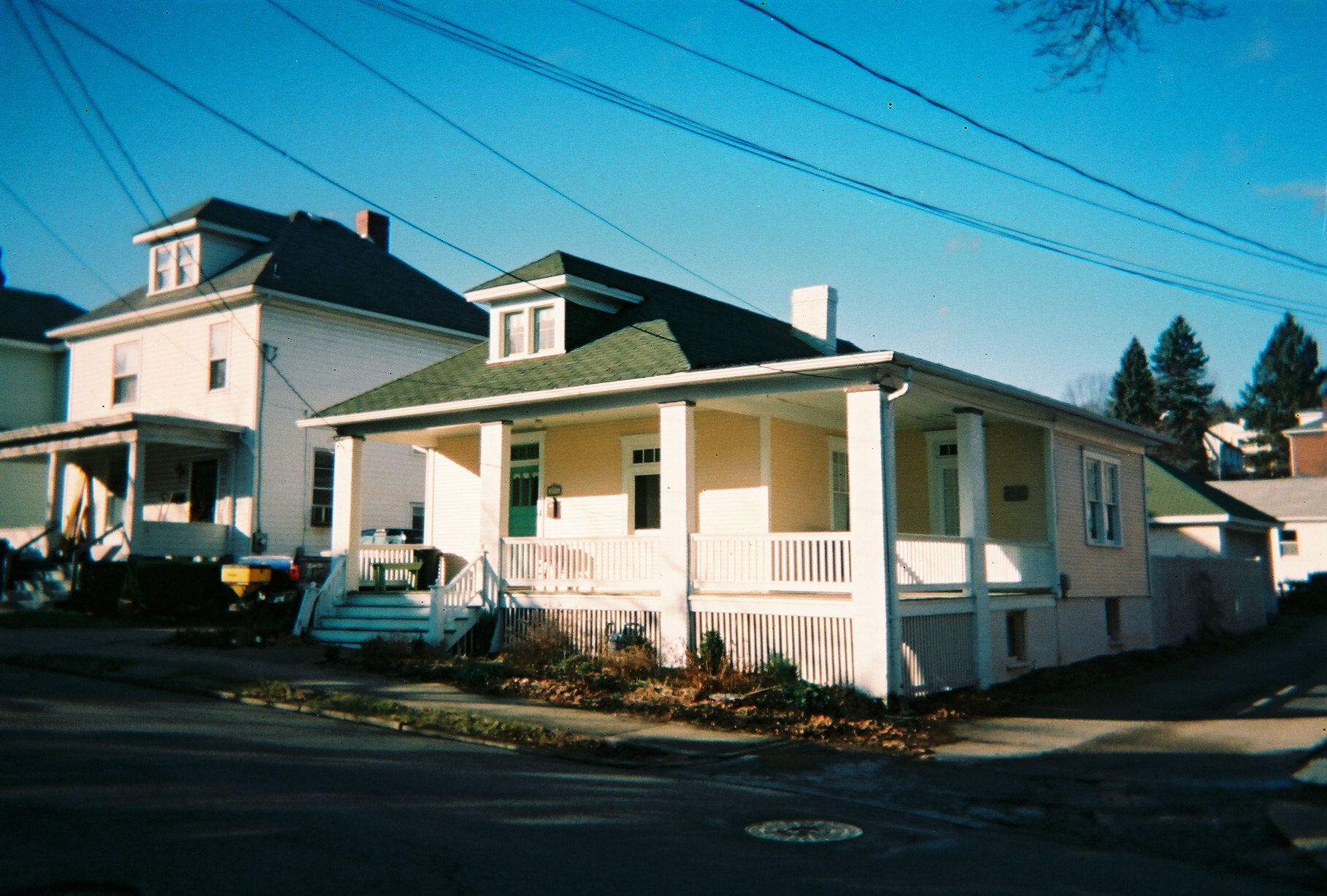
Sears Catalog Home (1925)
133 Grant Street
