= Sewickley Township, Pennsylvania =

Township in Pennsylvania, US

Coordinates: 40°14′N 79°43′W

- Township
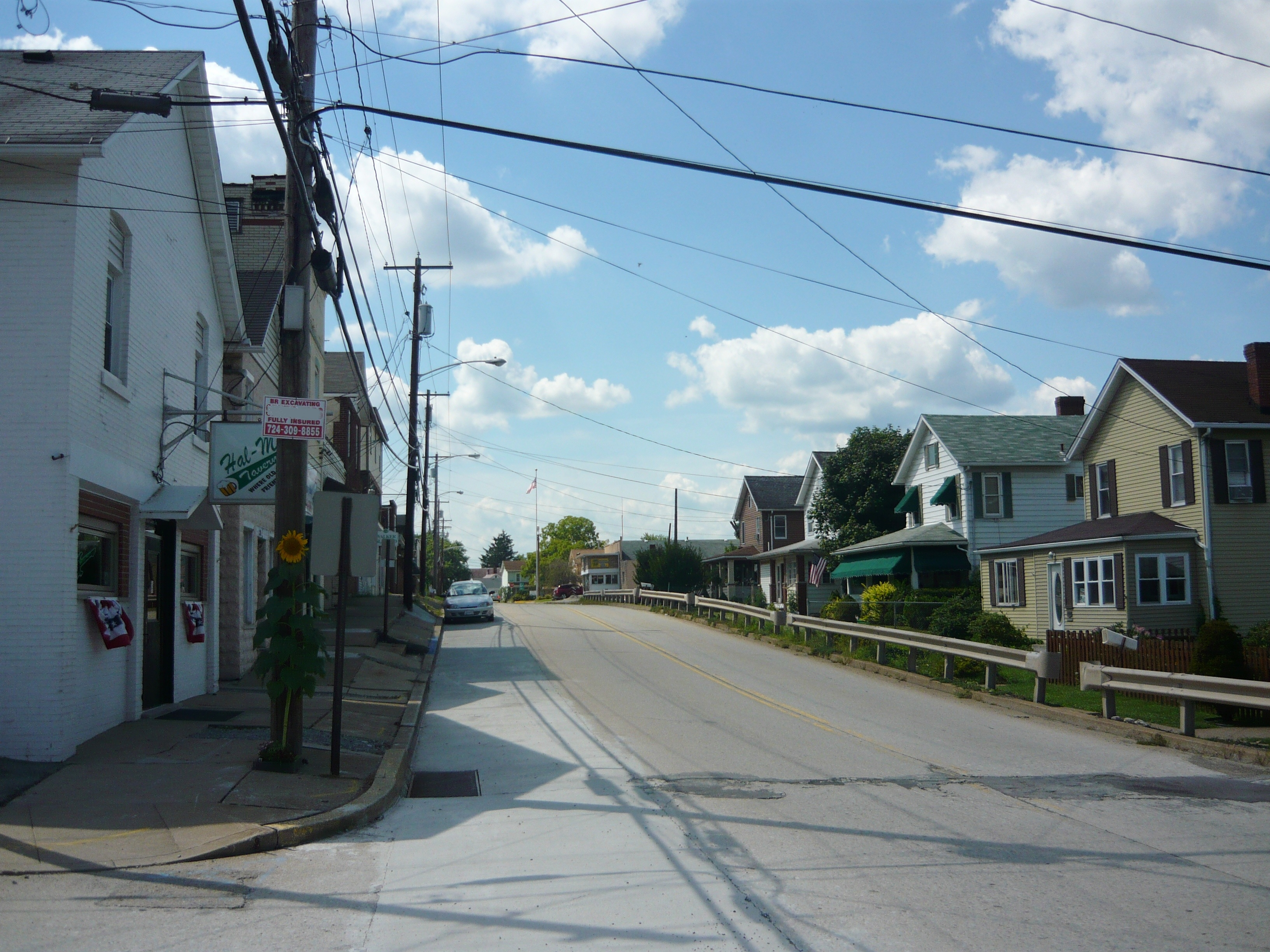
- Sewickley Avenue in Herminie

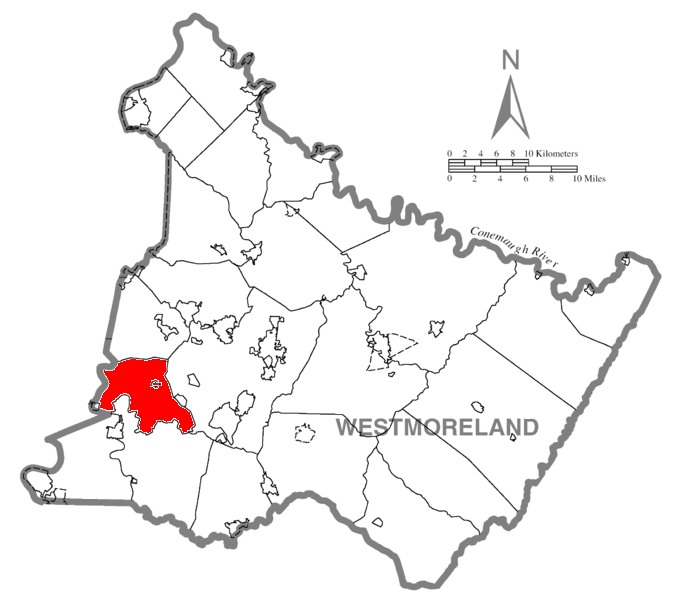
- Map of Westmoreland County, Pennsylvania Highlighting Sewickley Township

- Map of Pennsylvania highlighting Westmoreland County
- Country: United States
- State: Pennsylvania
- County: Westmoreland
- Settled: 1778
- Incorporated: 1835

Area
  - Total: 26.99 sq mi (69.90 km^{2})
  - Land: 26.76 sq mi (69.31 km^{2})
  - Water: 0.23 sq mi (0.60 km^{2})

Population (2020)
  - Total: 5,647
  - Estimate (2024): 5,553
  - Density: 211.0/sq mi (81.48/km^{2})
- Time zone: UTC-5 (Eastern (EST))
  - Summer (DST): UTC-4 (EDT)
- FIPS code: 42-129-69392
- Website: http://www.sewickleytownship.org

Sewickley Township is a township in Westmoreland County, Pennsylvania, United States. The population was 5,647 at the 2020 census.

== History ==
Sewickley Township was created in 1835 and named after Sewickley Creek. The Bells Mills Covered Bridge was listed on the National Register of Historic Places in 1980.

== Geography ==
According to the United States Census Bureau, the township has a total area of 27.0 square miles (69.9 km^{2}), of which 26.8 square miles (69.3 km^{2}) is land and 0.2 square mile (0.6 km^{2}) (0.86%) is water.

== Surrounding and adjacent neighborhoods ==
Sewickley Township has five land borders, including North Huntingdon Township to the north, Hempfield Township to the east and southeast, Madison borough to the east-southeast, South Huntingdon Township to the south, and Sutersville borough to the southwest. Across the Youghiogheny River in Allegheny County to the west, Sewickley Township is adjacent to Elizabeth Township. The CDP Herminie is also situated within the township.

== Demographics ==
Historical population
Census	Pop.	Note	%±
2000	6,230		—
2010	5,996		−3.8%
2020	5,647		−5.8%
2024 (est.)	5,553		−1.7%
U.S. Decennial Census

At the 2010 census there were 5,996 people, 2,524 households, and 1,722 families living in the township. The population density was 225.4 inhabitants per square mile (87.0/km^{2}). There were 2,766 housing units at an average density of 104.0 per square mile (40.2/km^{2}). The racial makeup of the township was 98.46% White, 0.37% African American, 0.31% Asian, 0.11% from other races, and 0.77% from two or more races. Hispanic or Latino of any race were 0.66%.

Of the 2,524 households 24.5% had children under the age of 18 living with them, 53.0% were married couples living together, 10.2% had a female householder with no husband present, and 31.8% were non-families. 27.4% of households were one person and 12.2% were one person aged 65 or older. The average household size was 2.37 and the average family size was 2.88.

The age distribution was 19.9% under the age of 18, 5.1% from 20 to 24, 22.6% from 25 to 44, 32.2% from 45 to 64, and 17.9% 65 or older. The median age was 45 years. For every 100 females there were 98.5 males. For every 100 females age 18 and over, there were 95.6 males.

The median household income was $32,677 and the median family income was $45,847. Males had a median income of $30,685 versus $20,263 for females. The per capita income for the township was $15,846. About 10.2% of families and 11.1% of the population were below the poverty line, including 21.4% of those under age 18 and 6.3% of those age 65 or over.

== See also ==
- New Sewickley Township, Pennsylvania
- North Sewickley Township, Pennsylvania
