= Citizens National Bank of Latrobe =

- U.S. National Register of Historic Places
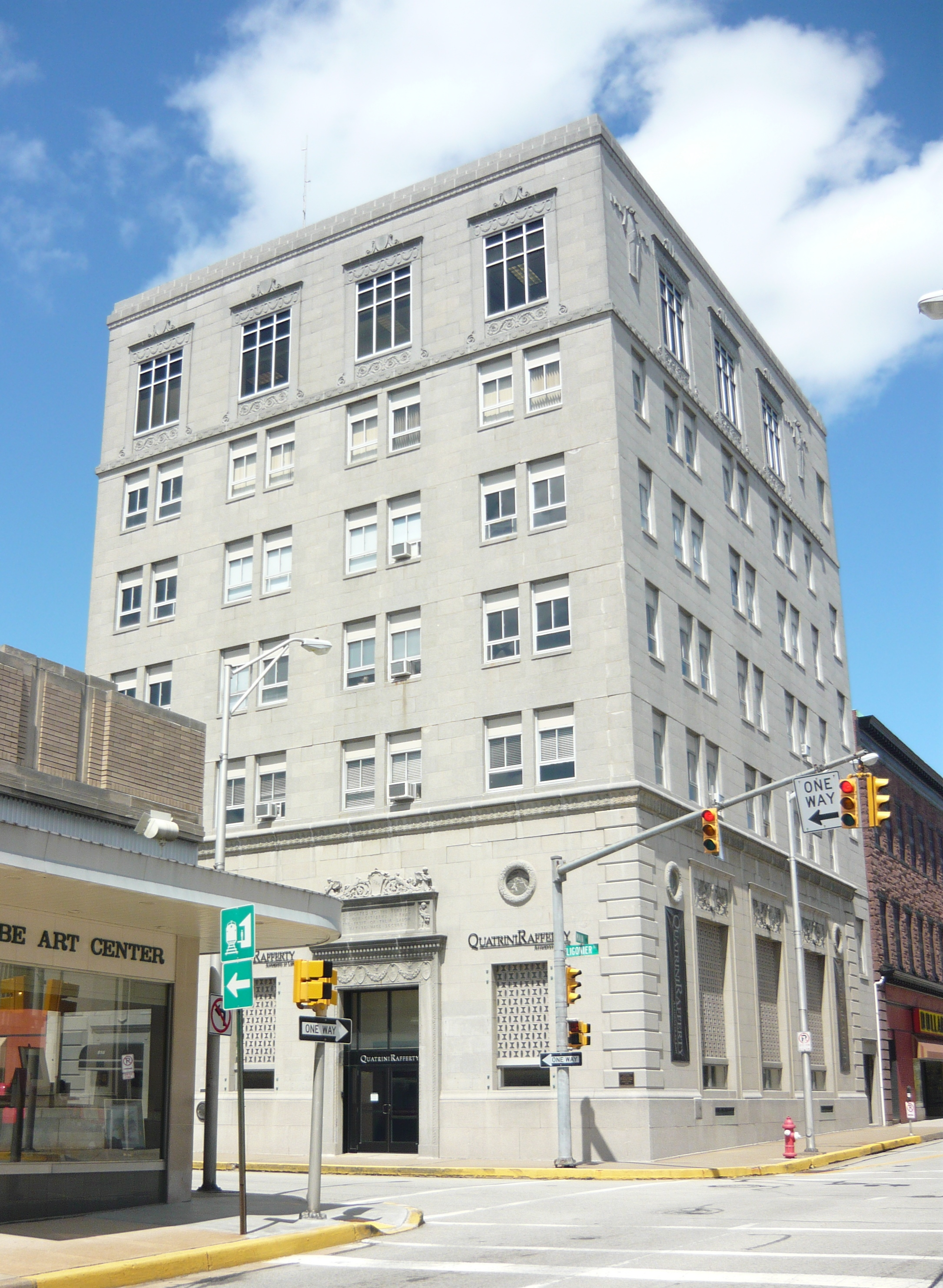
- Citizens National Bank Building

- Location within Pennsylvania Location within the United States
- Location: 816 Ligonier St., Latrobe, Pennsylvania
- Coordinates: 40°19′0″N 79°23′5″W
- Area: less than one acre
- Built: 1926
- Built by: Duffee, L.L.
- Architect: Bartholomew and Smith
- Architectural style: Renaissance
- NRHP reference No.: 02001281
- Added to NRHP: November 1, 2002

Citizens National Bank of Latrobe, also known as Mellon National Bank Building, is a historic bank building located at Latrobe, Westmoreland County, Pennsylvania. It was designed by architect Batholomew & Smith and built in 1926. It is a six-story, L-shaped, steel frame and masonry building in the Italian Renaissance Revival style. It has a brick and granite exterior and a flat roof. It is the tallest building in Latrobe.

It was added to the National Register of Historic Places in 2002.

== Gallery ==
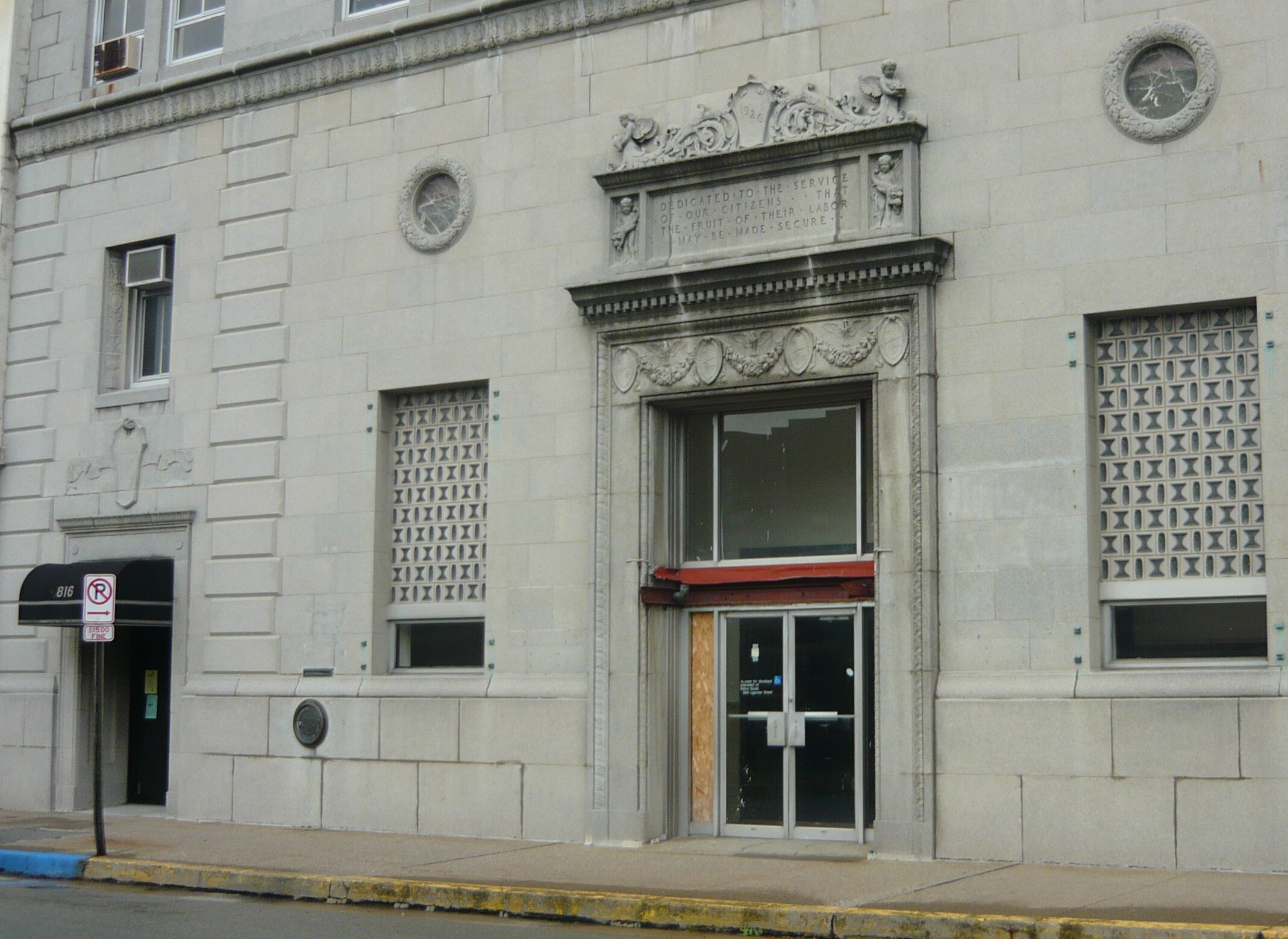
Detail of entrance to Citizens National Bank Building, August 2009
