= General Greene Hotel =

- Gen. Greene Hotel
- Formerly listed on the U.S. National Register of Historic Places
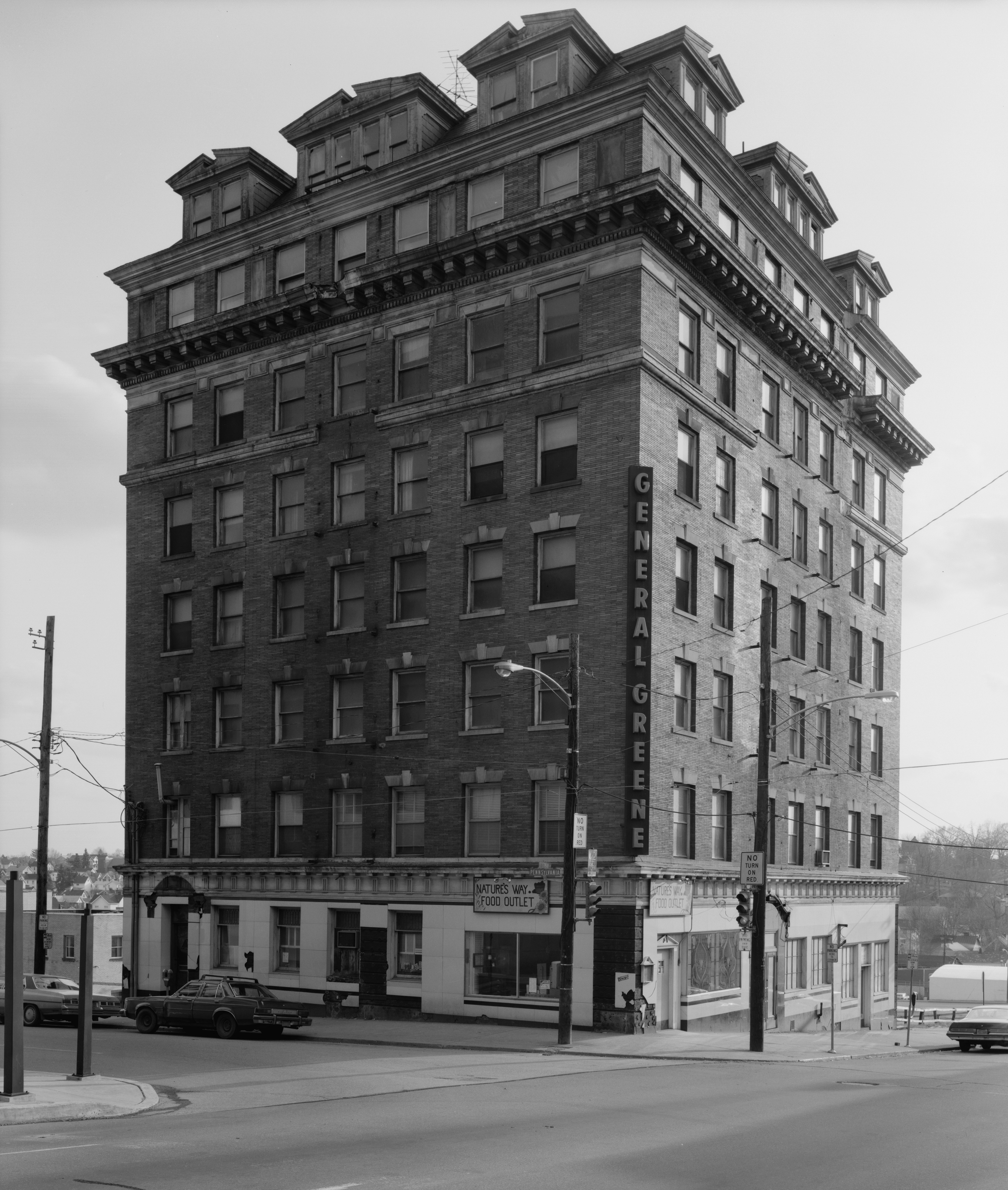
- General Greene Hotel, 1983
- Location: 24 W. Otterman St., Greensburg, Pennsylvania
- Area: 0.1 acres (0.040 ha)
- Built: 1903
- Built by: Myers, J. Rappe
- NRHP reference No.: 80003646

Significant dates
- Added to NRHP: August 29, 1980
- Removed from NRHP: June 16, 1988

General Greene Hotel, also known as the Hotel Rappe and Greensburger Hotel, was a historic hotel located at Greensburg, Westmoreland County, Pennsylvania. It was built in 1903.

It was listed on the National Register of Historic Places on June 16, 1980. It was delisted in 1988, after being demolished in 1984.
