= Bells Mills Covered Bridge =

- U.S. National Register of Historic Places
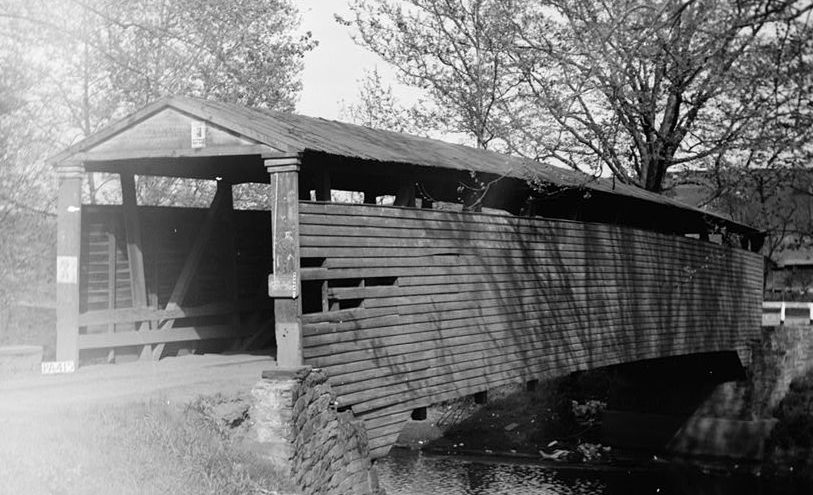
- Bells Mills Bridge, 1939

- Location within Pennsylvania Location within the United States
- Location: West of Yukon, Sewickley Township and South Huntingdon Township, Pennsylvania
- Coordinates: 40°13′9″N 79°42′37″W
- Area: 0.1 acres (0.040 ha)
- Built: 1850
- Built by: McCain, Daniel
- Architectural style: Greek Revival
- NRHP reference No.: 80003648
- Added to NRHP: June 27, 1980

Bells Mills Bridge is a historic wooden covered bridge in Sewickley Township and South Huntingdon Township, Westmoreland County, Pennsylvania. It is a 95-foot-long (29 m), Burr truss bridge, constructed in 1850. It features pedimented gables and plain pilasters in the Greek Revival style. It crosses Sewickley Creek.

It was listed on the National Register of Historic Places in 1980.
