= Slickville Historic District =

Historic district in Pennsylvania, United States

- U.S. National Register of Historic Places
- U.S. Historic district
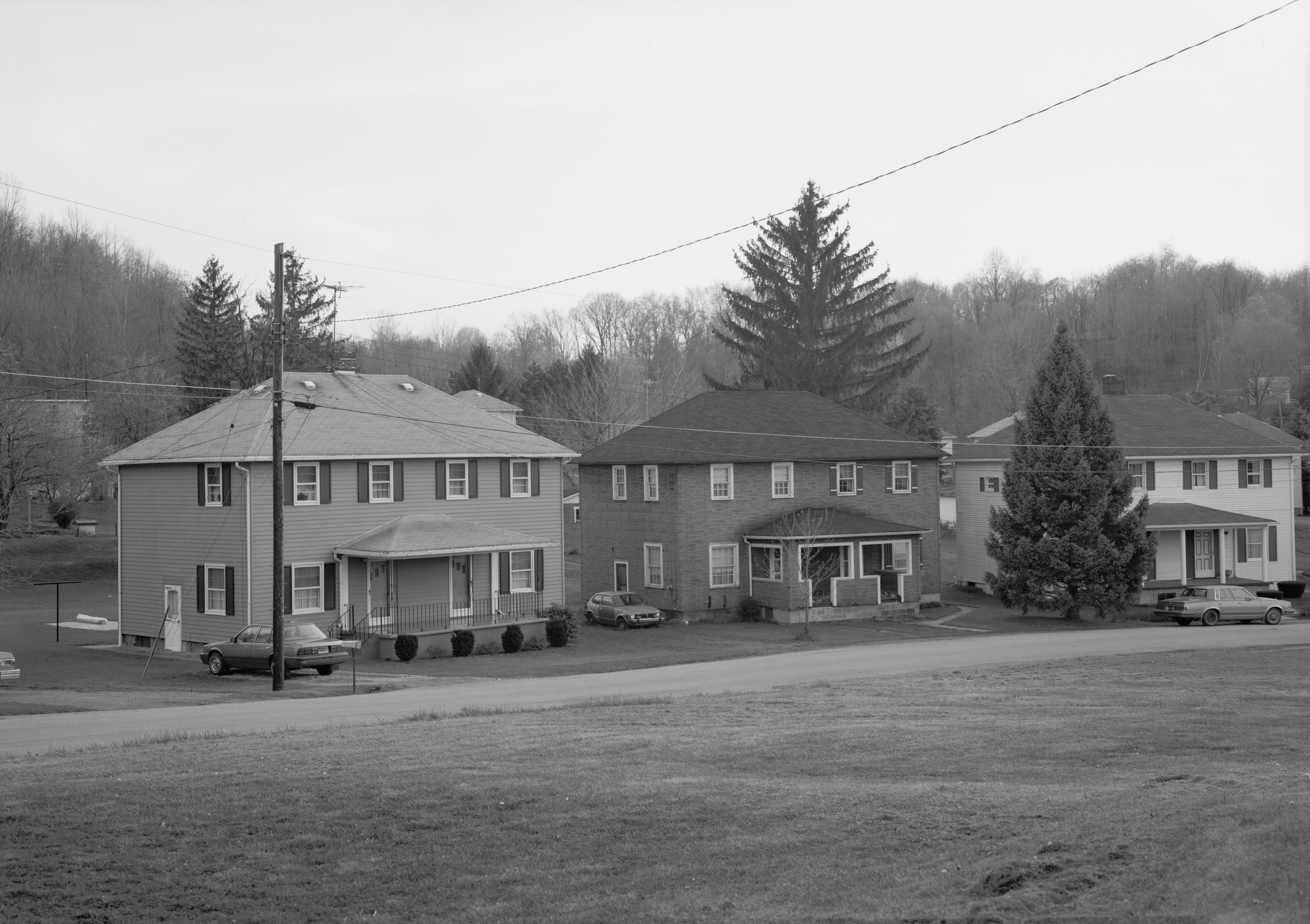
- First Avenue in Slickville, HABS Photo, April 1990

- Location within Pennsylvania Location within the United States
- Location: Roughly bounded by Greenburg and Second Ave. and Delmont, Court, Cottage, and Fred Sts., Salem Township, Pennsylvania
- Coordinates: 40°27′27″N 79°31′23″W
- Area: 62 acres (25 ha)
- Built: 1916–1923
- Built by: Thomas Tressler, J.A. Truxall
- MPS: Bituminous Coal and Coke Resources of Pennsylvania MPS
- NRHP reference No.: 94000522
- Added to NRHP: June 3, 1994

The Slickville Historic District is a national historic district that is located in Salem Township, Westmoreland County, Pennsylvania.

It was added to the National Register of Historic Places in 1994.

== History and architectural features ==
This district encompasses ninety contributing buildings and one contributing structure that are located in the unincorporated village of Slickville. The Cambria Steel Company built this mining town between 1916 and 1923. The contributing resources include workers' and managers' housing, four utilitarian mine-related buildings, a church, a school, a pump house, and a company store. The company-built community was later acquired by Bethlehem Steel, which operated Slick Mine No. 91 after 1923.
