= Hannastown Farm =

- U.S. National Register of Historic Places
- U.S. Historic district
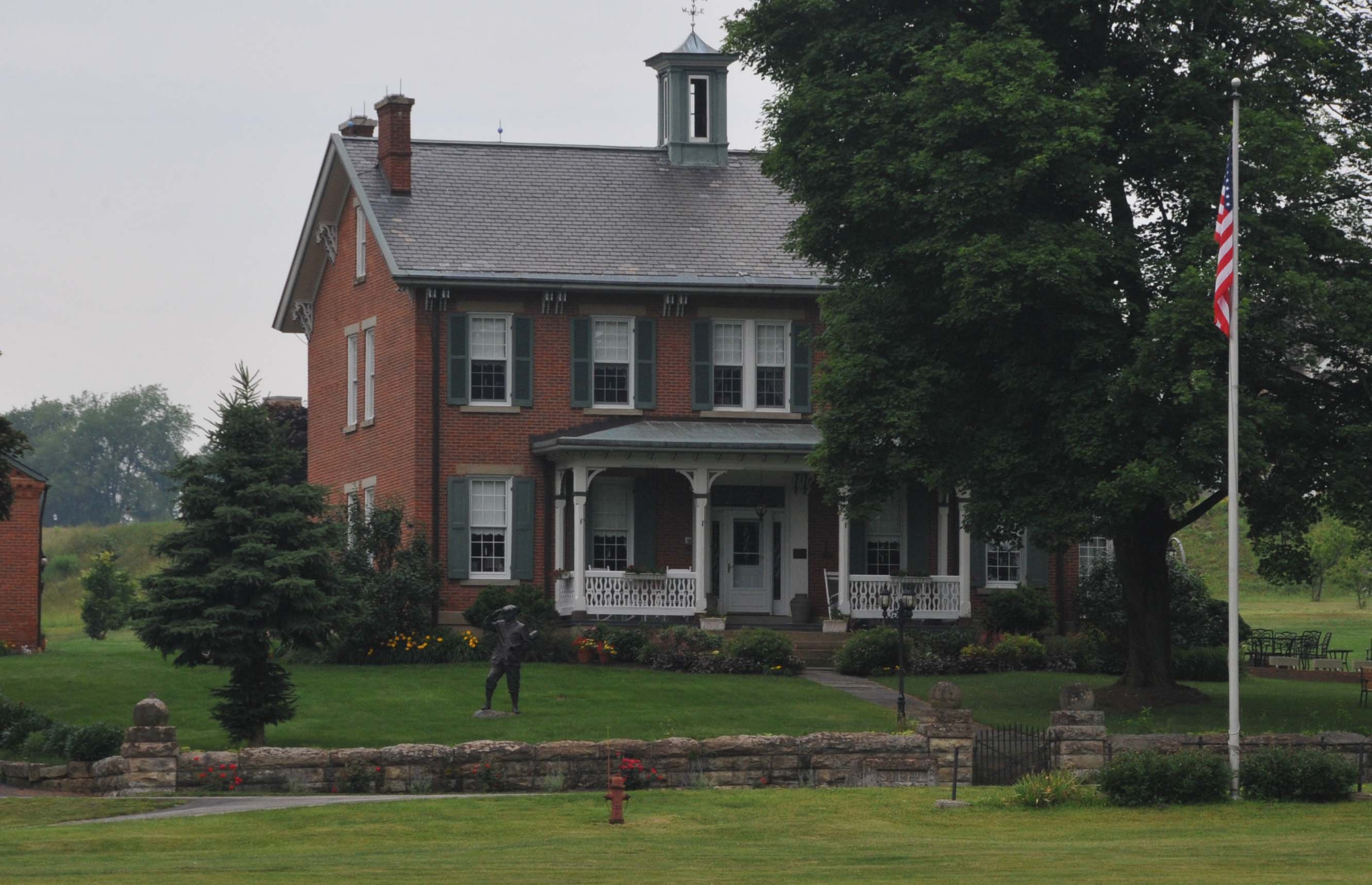

- Location within Pennsylvania Location within the United States
- Location: Northwest of the junction of Township 825 and Legislative Route 64054, Salem Township, Pennsylvania
- Coordinates: 40°21′11″N 79°30′21″W
- Area: 242 acres (98 ha)
- Built: 1866
- Architectural style: Italianate
- NRHP reference No.: 94000209
- Added to NRHP: March 17, 1994

Hannastown Farm, also known as the William Steel Farm, is a national historic district and farm which are located in Salem Township, Westmoreland County, Pennsylvania.

It was added to the National Register of Historic Places in 1994.

== History and architectural features ==
This historic district encompasses nine contributing buildings, one contributing site, and one contributing structure, including a mansion house, which was built between 1866 and 1867, an overseer's house with a kitchen house, a bank barnm which was erected in 1868 and includes a silo, a wagon shed, a tractor shed, a garage, and related dependencies. The house is a 2 1/2-story, L-shaped, red brick Italianate-style dwelling. The property also includes a prehistoric archaeological site.
