= Fairview Park (Westmoreland County, Pennsylvania) =

- U.S. National Register of Historic Places
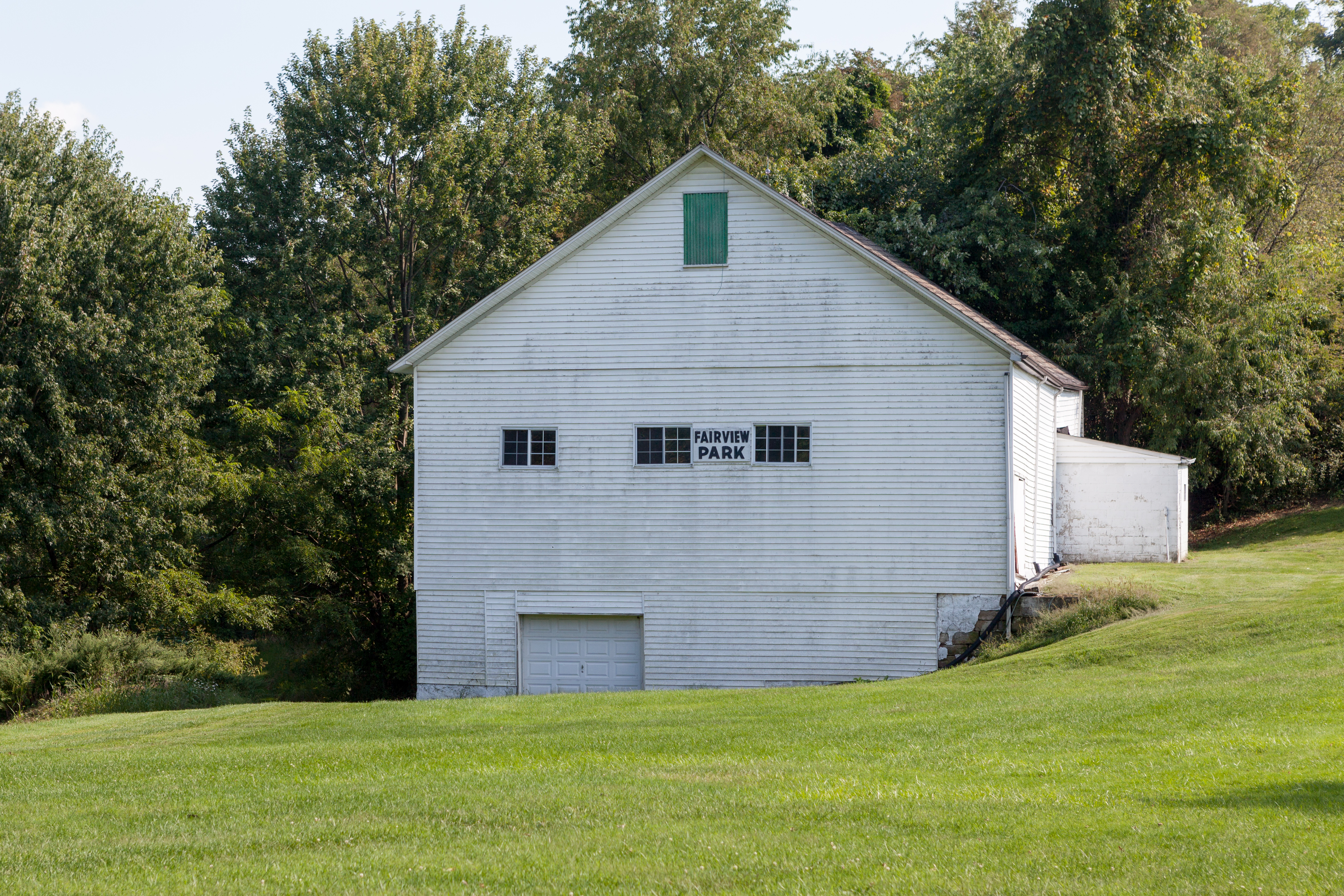
- The barn at Fairview Park

- Location within Pennsylvania Location within the United States
- Location: South side of Old Route 22, approximately 1.5 miles (2.4 km) east of Delmont, Salem Township, Pennsylvania
- Coordinates: 40°24′21″N 79°33′21″W
- Area: 53 acres (21 ha)
- Built: 1945
- NRHP reference No.: 10001069
- Added to NRHP: December 27, 2010

Historic Fairview Park, Assoc. is a historic African American spiritual retreat center and recreational destination located at Salem Township, Westmoreland County, Pennsylvania. It was developed during the Jim Crow era. Contributing resources include the landscape, ballfield, and a late-19th - early-20th century frame barn.

Fairview Park, Assoc. was developed in 1945 by the Monongahela Valley Sunday School Association — a group of African-American churches from Westmoreland and Allegheny counties. At a time when segregation restricted access to other public amusement parks, Fairview Park was a place the African-American community could call its own. At one point, the park had a roller coaster, a merry-go-round, a skating rink, a swimming pool, softball fields, swings, see-saws, a sandbox, a petting zoo, and hot-air balloon rides.

As of February 2011, Fairview Park received recognition on the National Register of Historic Places. Fairview Park is a family-oriented locale for private and public gatherings and events. Each year the Fairview Park Association holds its Annual Picnic, an event open to all on the third Saturday of August.

It was added to the National Register of Historic Places in 2010.
