= Mount Pleasant Historic District (Mount Pleasant, Pennsylvania) =

Historic district in Pennsylvania, United States

- U.S. National Register of Historic Places
- U.S. Historic district
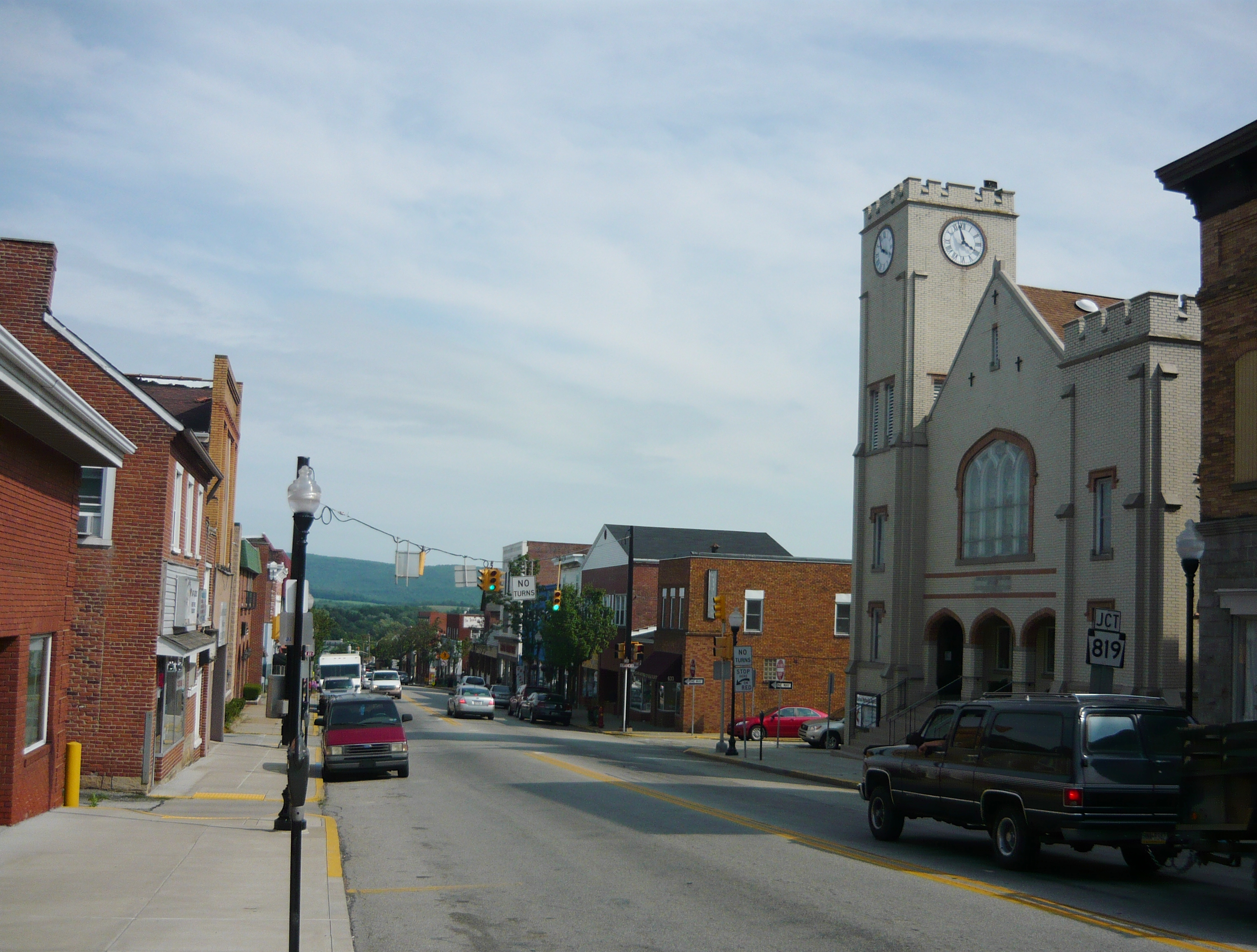
- Main Street, August 2011

- Location within Pennsylvania Location within the United States
- Location: Roughly along Main, S. Church, Eagle, Walnut and College Sts., Mount Pleasant, Pennsylvania
- Coordinates: 40°08′54″N 79°32′41″W
- Area: 65 acres (26 ha)
- Architect: Bowers, Robert; et al.
- Architectural style: Italianate, Queen Anne, Colonial Revival
- NRHP reference No.: 98000903
- Added to NRHP: July 23, 1998

The Mount Pleasant Historic District is a national historic district that is located in Mount Pleasant, Westmoreland County, Pennsylvania.

It was added to the National Register of Historic Places in 1998.

== History and architectural features ==
This district encompasses 268 contributing buildings, one contributing site, and one contributing object that are located in the central business district and surrounding residential areas of Mount Pleasant. Built roughly between 1812 and 1948, they include a mix of residential, commercial, institutional, and industrial properties, and were designed in a variety of popular architectural styles, including Italianate, Queen Anne, and Colonial Revival.

Notable buildings include the Overholt General Store (c. 1860), a harness shop (c. 1870), a warehouse (c. 1880), the East End Hotel (c. 1885), the Grand Central Hotel (c. 1895), the Gerechter Furniture Building (c. 1905), the Citizens Savings and Trust Company and First National Bank (1905), the Shupe Steam Grist Mill (1843), City Hall (1910), the Penn Theater (1937), the Reunion Presbyterian Church (1873), the Wesley United Methodist Church (1856), the Transfiguration Roman Catholic Church (1889), and three houses that were built circa 1812.

The contributing site is Frick Park. This district also includes the separately listed Samuel Warden House and demolished Mount Pleasant Armory.
