= W.G. Wilkins Company =

W.G. Wilkins Co. was an architectural and engineering firm of Pittsburgh. It was headed by William Glyde Wilkins (April 16, 1854 - April 12, 1921).

Wilkins and the firm designed many coke plants.

Joseph F. Kuntz was an important architect who worked for the firm and designed a number of armories through the state of Pennsylvania for the firm, before splitting off on his own in 1921 (and designing more).

The firm is credited in the design of a number of buildings that are listed on the National Register of Historic Places.

Works include (with attribution):

- Berwick Armory, 201 Pine St., Berwick, Pennsylvania (Wilkins, W.G., Co.; Kuntz, Joseph F.), NRHP-listed
- Blairsville Armory, 119 N. Walnut St., Blairsville, Pennsylvania (Wilkins, W.G. & Co.), NRHP-listed
- Butler Armory, 216 N. Washington St., Butler, Pennsylvania (Wilkins, W.G., Co.; Kuntz, Joseph F.), NRHP-listed
- Connellsville Armory, 108 W. Washington St., Connellsville, Pennsylvania (Wilkins, W.G., Co.), NRHP-listed
- Hunt Armory, 324 Emerson St., Pittsburgh (Wilkins, W.G., Co.), NRHP-listed
- Indiana Armory, 621 Wayne Ave., Indiana, Pennsylvania (Wilkins, W.G., Co.; Kuntz, Joseph F.), NRHP-listed
- Kane Armory, Jct. of Chestnut and Fraley Sts., Kane, Pennsylvania (Wilkins, W.G., Co.), NRHP-listed
- Milton Armory, 133 Ridge Ave., Milton, Pennsylvania (Wilkins, W.G., Co.), NRHP-listed
- Mount Pleasant Armory, Eagle and Spring Sts., Mount Pleasant, Pennsylvania (Wilkins, W.G. Co.), NRHP-listed
- Washington Armory, 76 W. Maiden St., Washington, Pennsylvania (Wilkins, W.G., Co.), NRHP-listed
