= Butler Armory =

- U.S. National Register of Historic Places
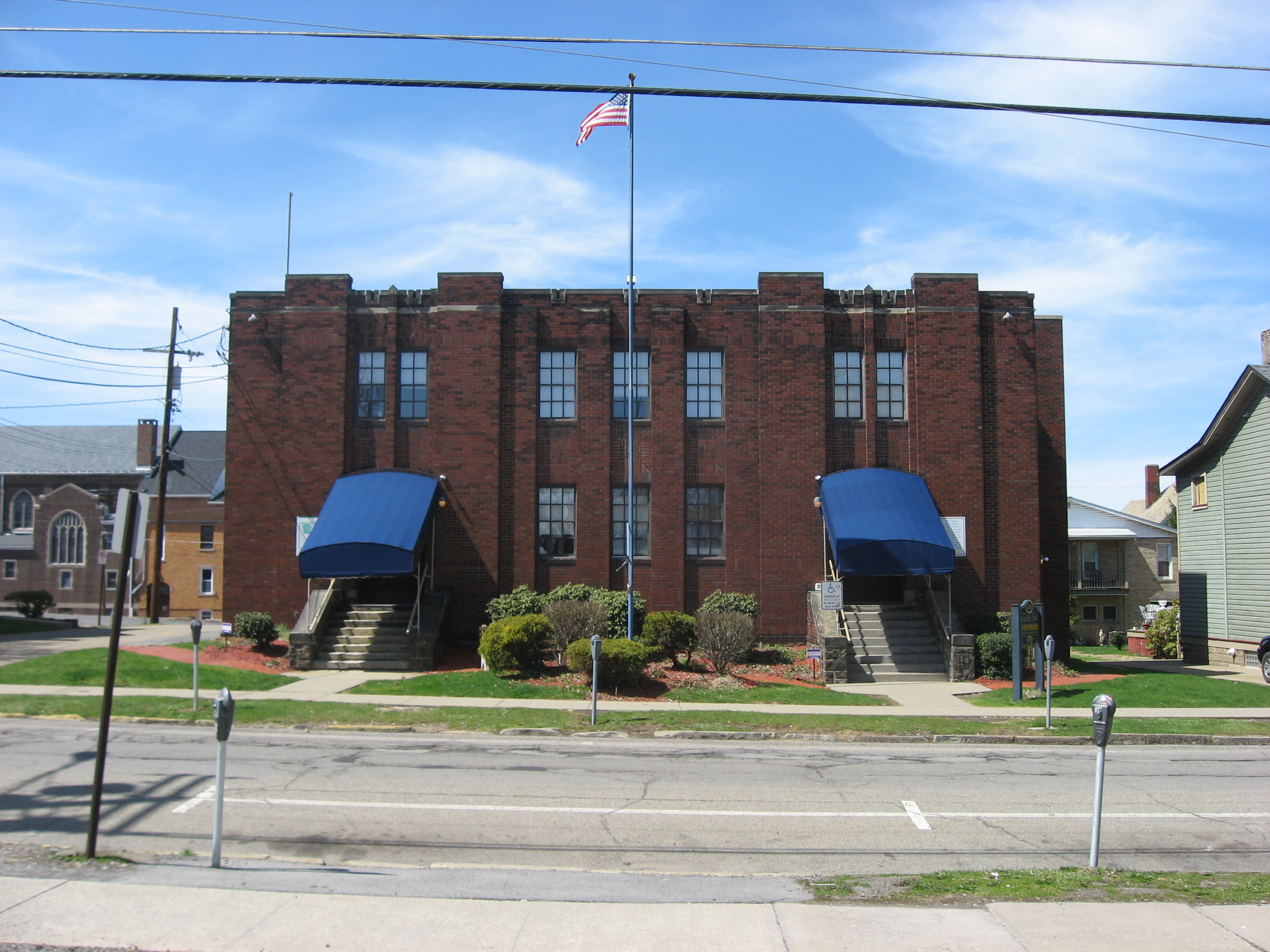
- Butler Armory, 2009

- Location within Pennsylvania Location within the United States
- Location: 216 N. Washington St., Butler, Pennsylvania
- Coordinates: 40°51′47″N 79°53′50″W
- Area: 0.4 acres (0.16 ha)
- Built: 1922
- Architect: Wilkins, W.G., Co.; Kuntz, Joseph F.
- Architectural style: Art Deco
- MPS: Pennsylvania National Guard Armories MPS
- NRHP reference No.: 91000903
- Added to NRHP: July 12, 1991

The Butler Armory is an historic National Guard armory which is located on Washington Street in Butler, Butler County, Pennsylvania.

It was listed on the National Register of Historic Places in 1991.

== History and architectural features ==
Designed by architect Joseph F. Kuntz with W.G. Wilkins, Co. and built in 1922, it was expanded in 1930. It is a "T"-plan building that consists of a one-story, brick, drill hall fronted by a two-story, brick administration section. The front section was designed in the Art Deco style. The building sits on a stone foundation. The administration section has a flat roof and the drill hall has a gambrel roof.

In June 1928, the Butler Armory hosted a regional dance marathon during the rise of endurance contests across the United States. A classified advertisement in the Pittsburgh Press called for “50 couples to enter dance marathon to be held at Butler State Armory Hall,” with the contest beginning at 12:15 a.m. on June 11. These events, which gained popularity in the late 1920s and early 1930s, challenged participants to dance for extended periods in exchange for prize money and drew large crowds during the early days of the Great Depression.

On June 23, 2010, Brig. Gen. Joseph De Paul dedicated the new Butler Readiness Center. The new facility, located at 250 Kriess Road, Renfrew, Pennsylvania, is home to Company A, 1st Battalion, 112th Infantry Regiment, 56th Stryker Brigade Combat Team. In addition to providing additional space for soldiers to work and train, it allows the soldiers of the Stryker Brigade to conduct the technical training required for the advanced systems they use during combat operations.
