= Firstside Historic District =

Historic district in Pennsylvania, United States

- U.S. National Register of Historic Places
- U.S. Historic district
- Pittsburgh Landmark – PHLF
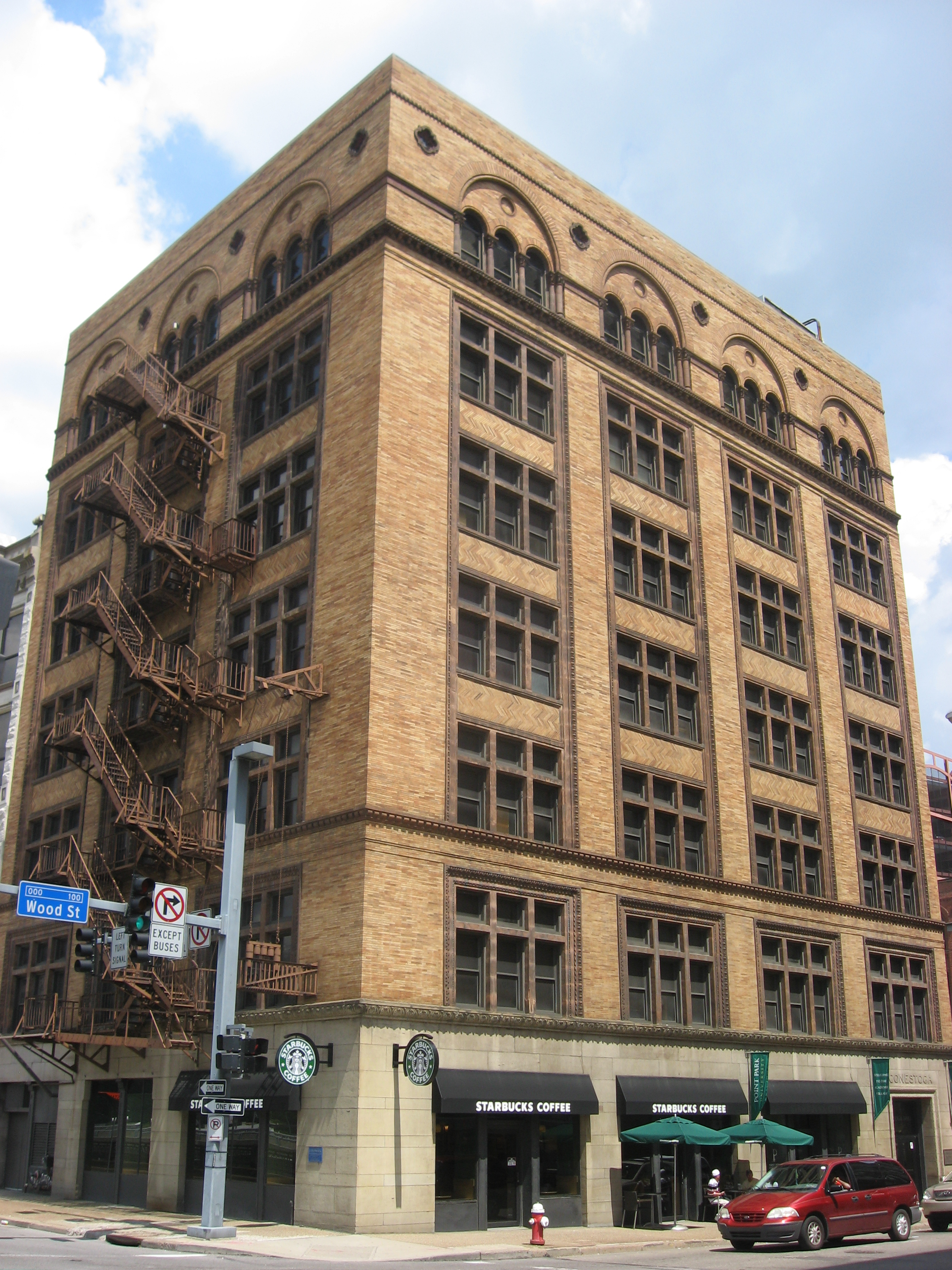
- Conestoga Building, 7 Wood Street

- Location within Pennsylvania
- Location: 211–249 Fort Pitt Boulevard; 1–7 Wood Street (Downtown Pittsburgh), Pittsburgh, Pennsylvania, USA
- Coordinates: 40°26′17″N 80°0′11″W
- Architect: Et al., Longfellow, Alden & Harlow
- Architectural style: Greek Revival, Late Victorian
- NRHP reference No.: 88001215 and 13000248

Significant dates
- Added to NRHP: July 28, 1988 (original) and May 8, 2013 (increase)
- Designated PHLF: 1992

The Firstside Historic District is a historic district in downtown Pittsburgh, Pennsylvania, United States. The district was listed on the National Register of Historic Places on July 28, 1988, and its boundaries were expanded on May 8, 2013.

Notable contributing properties in the district include:

- 109–115 Wood Street
- 412 Boulevard of the Allies
- Engine Company No. 1 and No. 30
- Guckenheimer Warehouse
- Hartley-Rose Belting Company Building
- Mamaux Building
