= Latrobe Armory =

- U.S. National Register of Historic Places
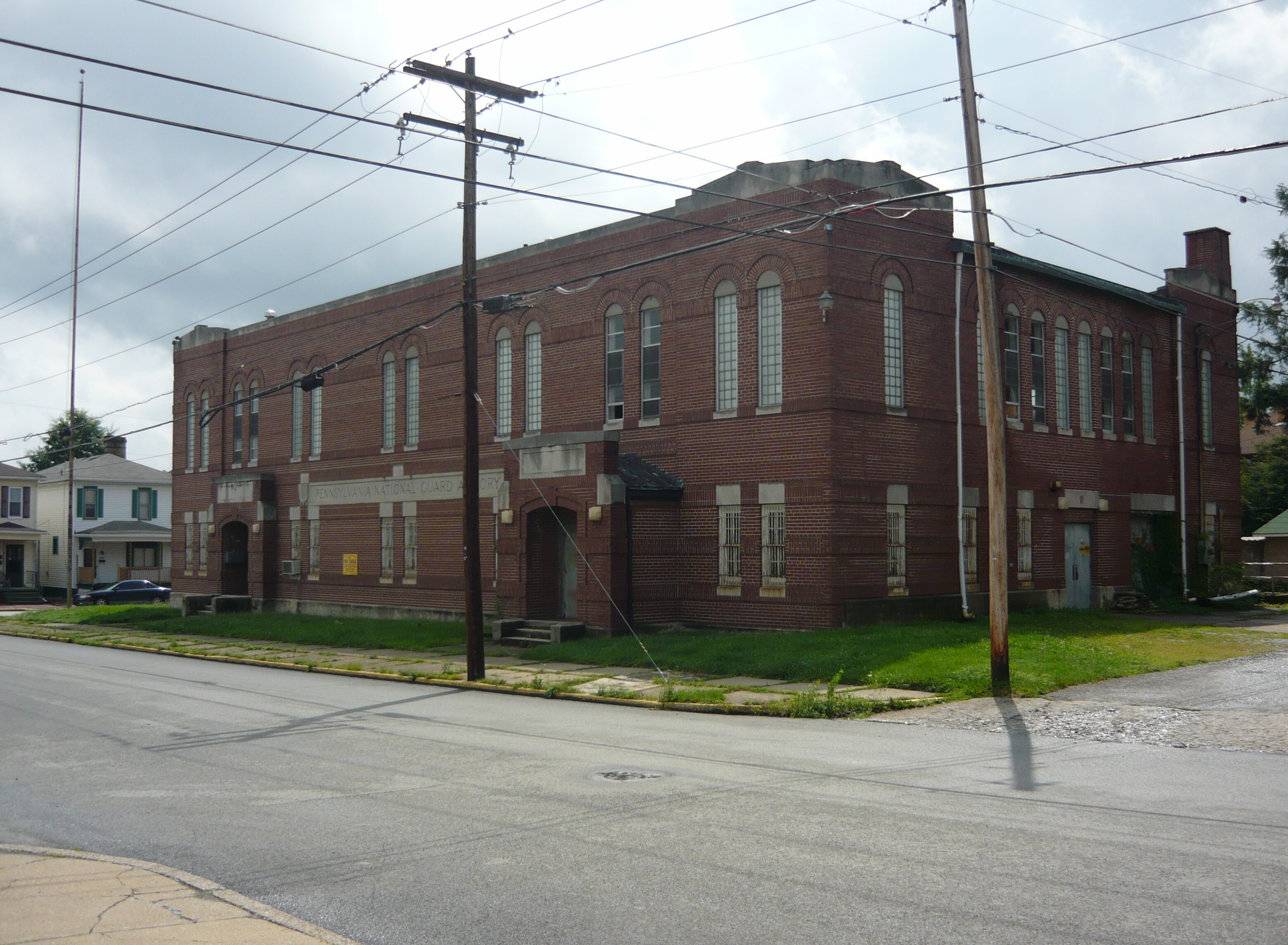
- Latrobe Armory, August 2009

- Location within Pennsylvania Location within the United States
- Location: 1017 Ridge Ave., Latrobe, Pennsylvania
- Coordinates: 40°19′0″N 79°22′53″W
- Area: 0.2 acres (0.081 ha)
- Built: 1928
- Built by: Pohland Brothers Building & Lumber
- Architect: Kuntz, Joseph F.
- Architectural style: Art Deco
- Demolished: 2011
- MPS: Pennsylvania National Guard Armories MPS
- NRHP reference No.: 89002076
- Added to NRHP: December 22, 1989

The Latrobe Armory was an historic National Guard armory that was located in Latrobe, Westmoreland County, Pennsylvania.

It was added to the National Register of Historic Places in 1989. The structure was demolished in 2011.

== History and architectural features ==
Built in 1928, this historic structure was a two-story, rectangular, brick building, which measured seven bays by three bays and was designed in the Art Deco style. The administrative area was located on the first floor, with the drill hall on the second.
