= Connellsville Armory =

- U.S. National Register of Historic Places
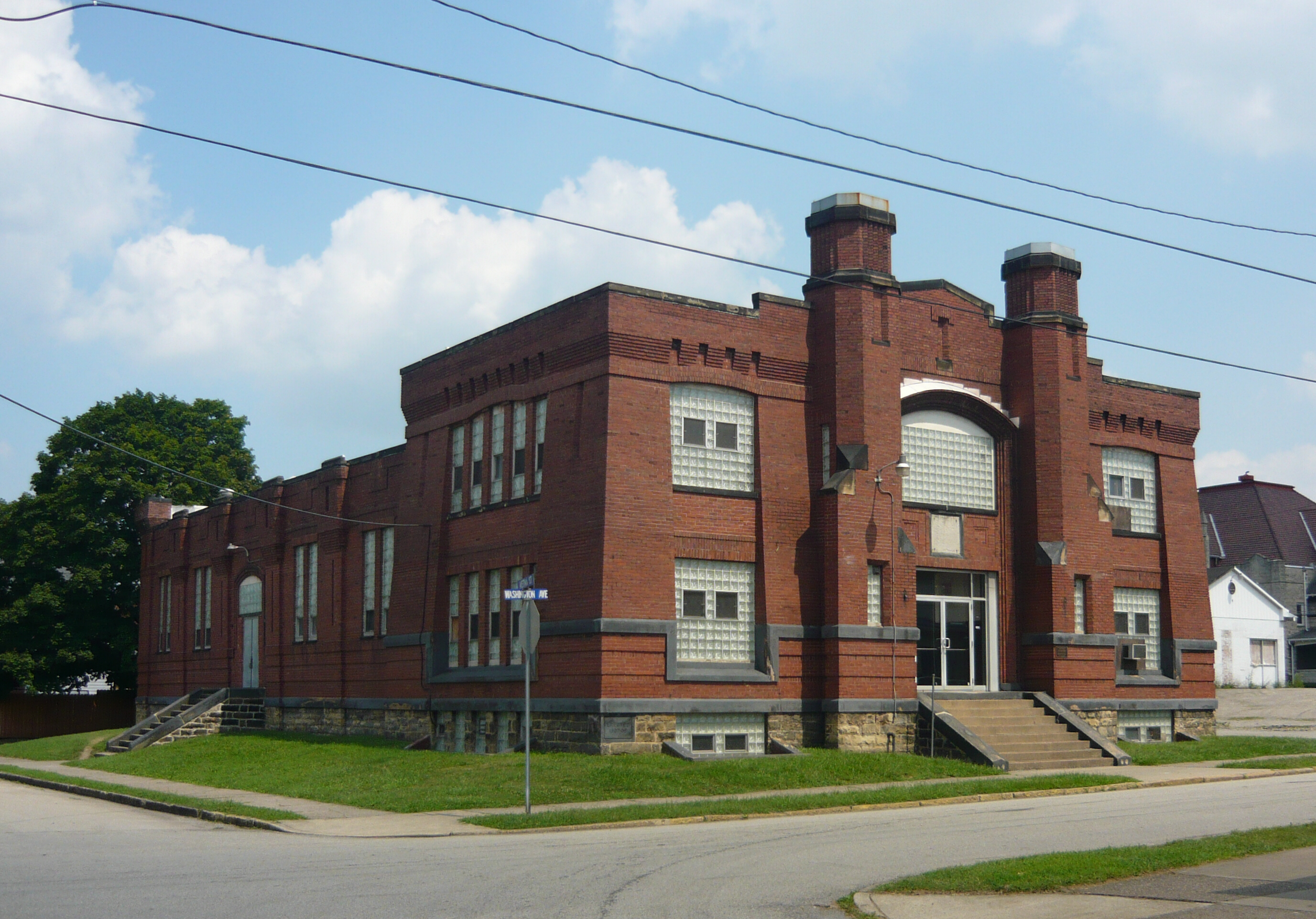
- Connellsville Armory, August 2009

- Location within Pennsylvania Location within the United States
- Location: 108 W. Washington St., Connellsville, Pennsylvania
- Coordinates: 40°0′41″N 79°35′24″W
- Area: 0.3 acres (0.12 ha)
- Built: 1907
- Built by: Hurst, Mark H.
- Architect: Wilkins, W.G., Co.
- Architectural style: Late Gothic Revival, Tudor Revival
- MPS: Pennsylvania National Guard Armories MPS
- NRHP reference No.: 91001694
- Added to NRHP: November 14, 1991

Connellsville Armory is a historic National Guard armory located at Connellsville, Fayette County, Pennsylvania. It was designed by Pittsburgh architects W.G. Wilkins Co. It was built in 1907, and consists of a two-story administration section with a rear one-story drill hall in a "T"-plan. The 55 foot by 110 foot building is constructed of brick on a coursed ashlar foundation. It has a number of Tudor Revival / Late Gothic Revival style details including a two-story entrance arch, a gabled parapet, and brick polygonal towers.

It was added to the National Register of Historic Places in 1991.
