= 412 Boulevard of the Allies =

Building in Pittsburgh, Pennsylvania

- U.S. Historic district – Contributing property
- Pittsburgh Historic Designation
- Location within Pittsburgh Location within Pennsylvania Location within the United States
- Location: 412 Boulevard of the Allies, Pittsburgh, Pennsylvania, USA
- Coordinates: 40°26′14″N 79°59′59″W
- Built: 1927
- Part of: Firstside Historic District (boundary increase) (ID13000248)

Significant dates
- Designated CP: May 8, 2013
- Designated CPHD: January 4, 2023

The 412 Boulevard of the Allies, or simply the 412 building, located in Pittsburgh, PA, is a steel-framed office building coated in the stylings of the Late Gothic Revival and Commercial Gothic movements. Initially conceived under the moniker of 420, the structure was completed in 1927 and served as the headquarters of the W.J. Gilmore Drug Company. It changed ownership through the years, including the Portable Products Corporation (1947), the Equitable Gas Company (1950), and ultimately, the various municipal facets of the City of Pittsburgh (2018). As of May 2022, the former headquarters is a protected Pittsburgh Historic Landmark. It was also listed as a contributing property in the Firstside Historic District in 2013.

== History ==
The site of 412 was previously inhabited by the Second Avenue Mansion of one James B. Murray. Following the 1866 sale of the three-story Italianate home, it was transformed into the Homeopathic Medical and Surgical Hospital and Dispensary of Pittsburgh. In 1883, the hospital expanded into the eastern bordering lot to meet rising demand. This new hospital was a larger brick complex designed by John U. Barr. By 1905, the site proved to be insufficient to meet demand, resulting in a complete relocation to Centre Avenue in Shadyside in early 1910.

The portion of the hospital remaining at the original site would run until its closing in 1915. Following two years on the market, the property would be purchased and demolished by the W.J. Gilmore Drug Company, under the direction of Samuel Dempster. Deliberations concerning the buying of the property had initially stalled due to municipal plans to widen the northern portion of Cherry Way (now William Penn Place) affecting the previous location of Gilmore Drug. In February 1924, the property was formally introduced to the board to begin the motion of transforming the lot, and the adjacent Maffett estate purchased in June, into the company's headquarters. Following the acquisition of a building permit in 1925, the structure was constructed from late 1925 until the early months of 1927. Upon its completion, the new building was one of the most extensive wholesale drug houses in Pennsylvania.

In late 1944, Gilmore was acquired by McKesson & Robbins, Inc., and the building was subsequently sold to the Portable Realty Corporation, the overseer of its affiliate Portable Products Corporation, on April 30 of 1947. This real estate acquisition would bankrupt the company by 1949, resulting in a sale to the stock company 420 Corporation the year prior. Their attempt to transition 421 into a speculative property would fail by the next year, resulting in another sale in May 1950 to the Equitable Gas Company. Under the tenure of the new company, the building would be renamed the Equitable Building. Before the 1952 reopening, the structure would be retrofitted, including new windows on the western facade. 1956 saw an architectural marketing move crown the building with the installation of a 21-foot-tall weather beacon; later uninstalled in 1972. In 1963, as part of the company's 75th anniversary celebration, the ground floor renters were bought out, and six large copper gas lights were installed on the front facade.

In 1995, the building was awarded a historic landmark plaque by the Pittsburgh History and Landmarks Foundation, a title lacking preservation and protection. Equitable Resources' ownership ended in 1999 when it sold the property to the Art Institute of Pittsburgh, which would work with the Design Alliance to convert office spaces into 75 state-of-the-art classrooms. In May 2013, the building was part of the architectural stock used to justify the expansion of the Firstside National Register Historic District.

The Art Institute would leave the building in 2017 following the expiration of its two-year lease issued by the new owners, 420 Allies LLC. M&J Wilkow and Center Square Investment Management refitted the classrooms into new office space. The building would find its current owners in September 2018 with the joint purchase of the property by the Housing Authority of the City of Pittsburgh, the City of Pittsburgh, and the Urban Redevelopment Authority of Pittsburgh. With this purchase, the property changed its name from 420 to 412 to reflect the regional telephone area code.

== Architecture ==
412 Boulevard of the Allies is the work of famed turn-of-the-century architect Joseph Franklin Kuntz, a Pennsylvania native and later principal architect of the W.G. Wilkins Company. Kuntz's design was a nine-story structure, including a basement, a steel-frame office building. The structure's massing is primarily a rectangular prism divided horizontally into five bays and vertically into eight primary floors; the ninth floor is obscured due to a double-height vestibule. The roof line is flat. The base skeleton is clad in ornamentation of stone and brick. Materiality is primarily vernacular with intense concentration centered on local materials, with steel fabricated by McClintic-Marshall, brick molded by Kittanning Brick Company, and marble by American Marble Company. This program of local pride was orchestrated under the watch of the W.T. Grange Construction Company.

The structure's architectural program is defined by a pastiche of commercial functionality and Gothic stylings. The commercial typology is represented in construction with the steel skeleton forming a box massing with flat masonry walls and roofing. The rectilinear normality of the base structure is offset by applied ornament. The Late Gothic Revival is applied to the varying facades of 412 with the construction of the first-floor arcades, piers containing bundled colonettes, carved ornamental spandrel panels, and implementations of tracery. This blend of details gives birth to the commercial gothic, an application of the sacred to the morally dubious behavior of the secular urbanscape.
