= Joseph F. Kuntz =

American architect

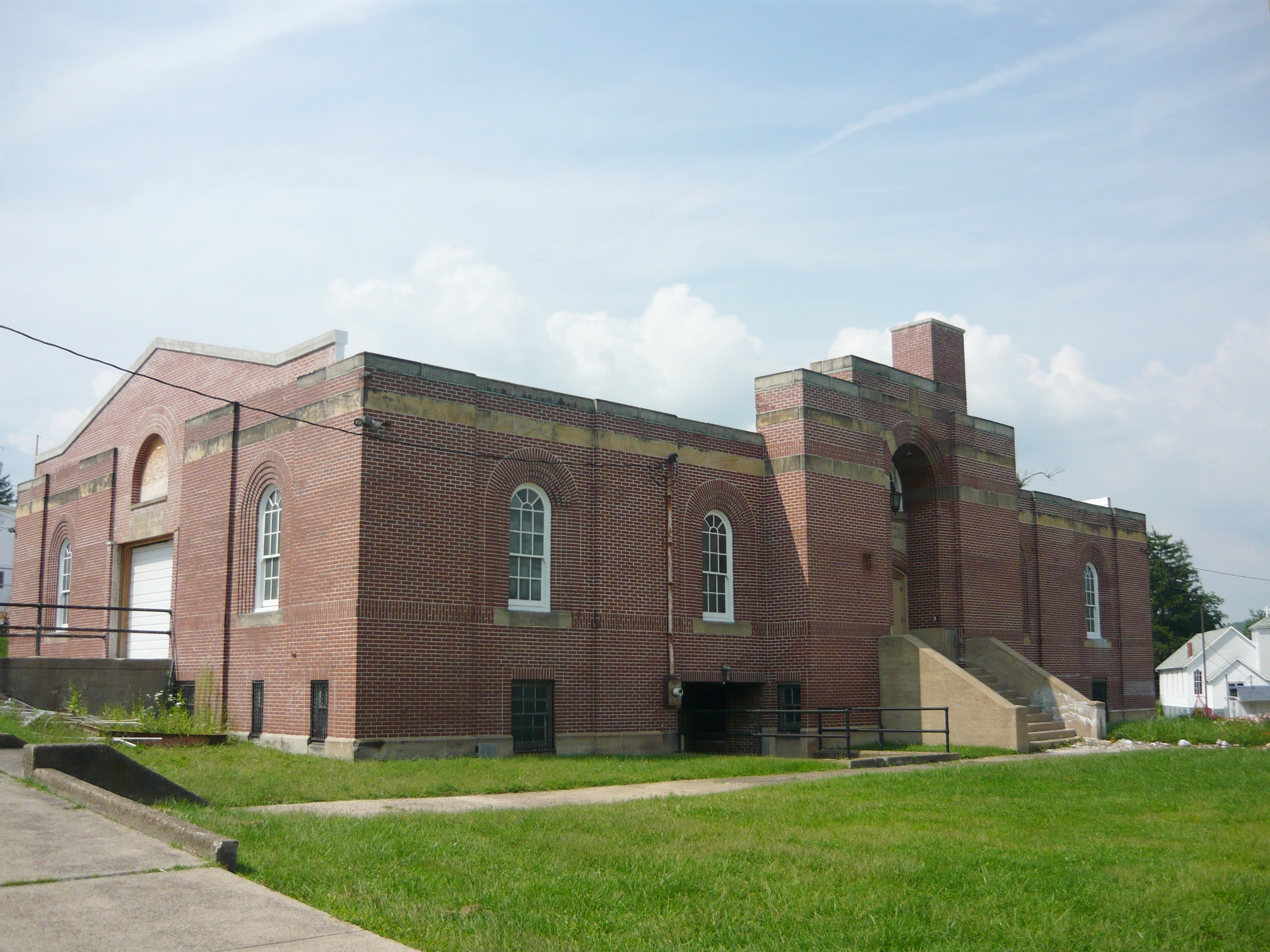
Scottdale Armory

Joseph Franklin Kuntz (September 1868 - after 1930) was an American architect who was based in Pittsburgh, Pennsylvania. He designed at least eighteen armories in Western Pennsylvania, with the W.G. Wilkins Company, following the 1905 creation of a state armory board.

== Biography ==
Born in Pennsylvania in September 1868, Joseph F. Kuntz was the son of a father who emigrated from Germany and a mother who was a Pennsylvania native. At the time of the 1900 and 1910 United States censuses, Kuntz was living in Pittsburgh with his wife Anna. By the time of the 1910 Census, they also had two sons Joseph, Jr., and Blair. By the time of the 1930 Census, Kuntz was still living in Pittsburgh and was a widower.

A number of his works are listed on the U.S. National Register of Historic Places.

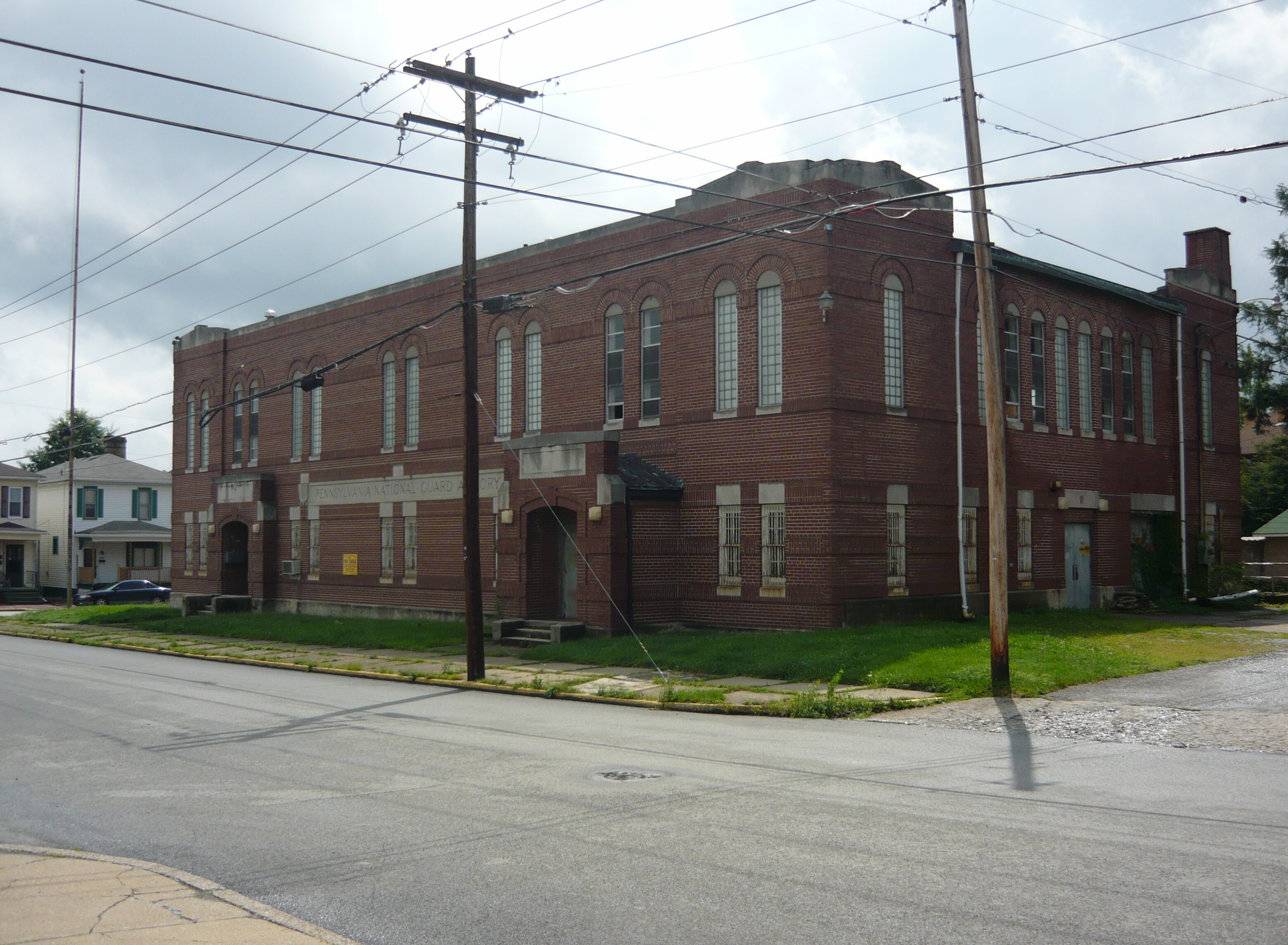
Latrobe Armory

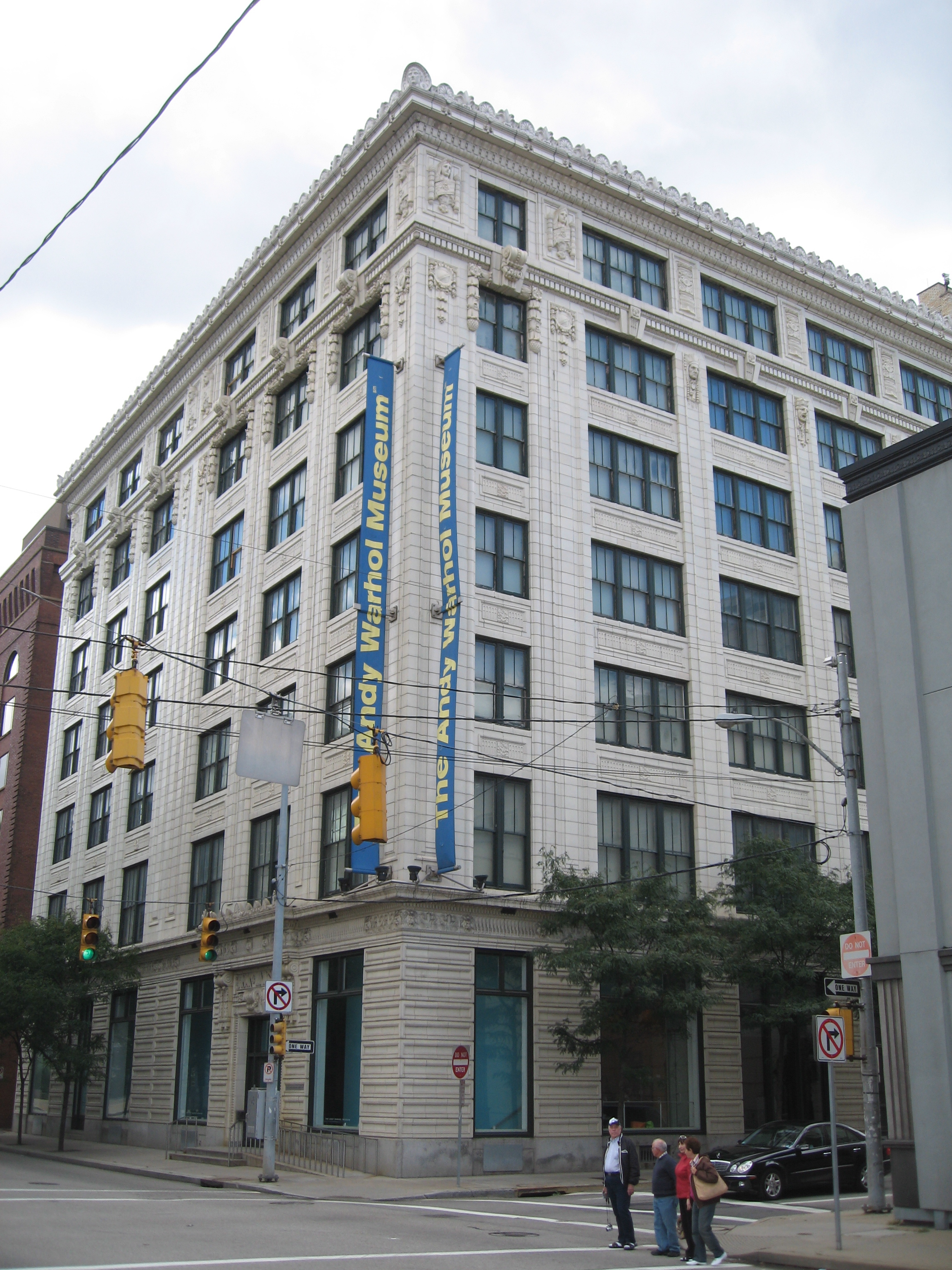
The Andy Warhol Museum

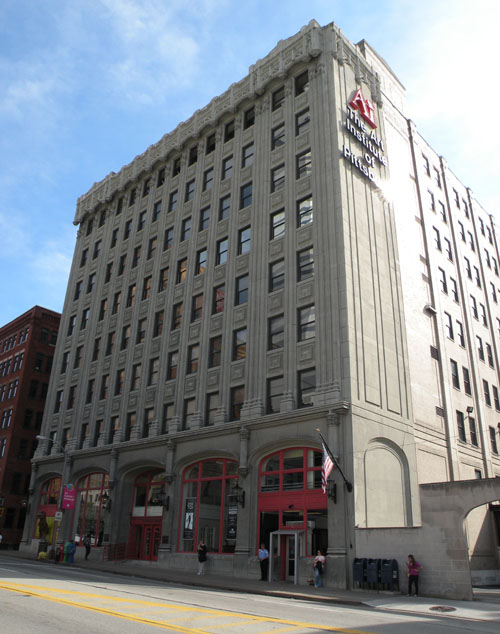
Art Institute of Pittsburgh

Kuntz's works include (with attribution):

- 412 Boulevard of the Allies, formerly the Equitable Gas Company Building, Pittsburgh, Pennsylvania
- The Andy Warhol Museum, formerly known as Volkwein's Frick & Lindsay Building, 117 Sandusky Street, Pittsburgh, Pennsylvania
- The Atlantic Building, aka the Atlantic Refining Company Building, 258-262 South Broad Street, Philadelphia, Pennsylvania
- Bellefonte Armory, E. Bishop Street, Bellefonte, Pennsylvania (Kuntz, Joseph F.), NRHP-listed
- Berwick Armory, 201 Pine Street, Berwick, Pennsylvania (Kuntz, Joseph F.), NRHP-listed
- Butler Armory, 216 N. Washington Street, Butler, Pennsylvania (Kuntz, Joseph F.), NRHP-listed
- Ford City Armory, 301 Tenth Street, Ford City, Pennsylvania (Kuntz, Joseph F.), NRHP-listed
- Hunt Armory, 324 Emerson Street, Shadyside, Pittsburgh, Pennsylvania
- Huntingdon Armory, Standing Stone Avenue, Huntingdon, Pennsylvania (Kuntz, Joseph F.), NRHP-listed
- Indiana Armory, 621 Wayne Avenue, Indiana, Pennsylvania (Kuntz, Joseph F.), NRHP-listed
- Kane Armory, built 1922, NRHP-listed
- Latrobe Armory, 1017 Ridge Ave. Latrobe, Pennsylvania (Kuntz, Joseph F.), NRHP-listed
- Linden Hall at Saint James Park, RR 26051 NW of Dawson, Dawson, Pennsylvania (Kuntz, Joseph Franklin), NRHP-listed
- Scottdale Armory, 501 N. Broadway Street, Scottdale, Pennsylvania (Kuntz, Joseph F.), NRHP-listed
- W.W. Lawrence Paint Co. Building, Pittsburgh, Pennsylvania

== See also ==
- List of Pittsburgh History and Landmarks Foundation Historic Landmarks
