= Bellefonte Armory =

- U.S. National Register of Historic Places
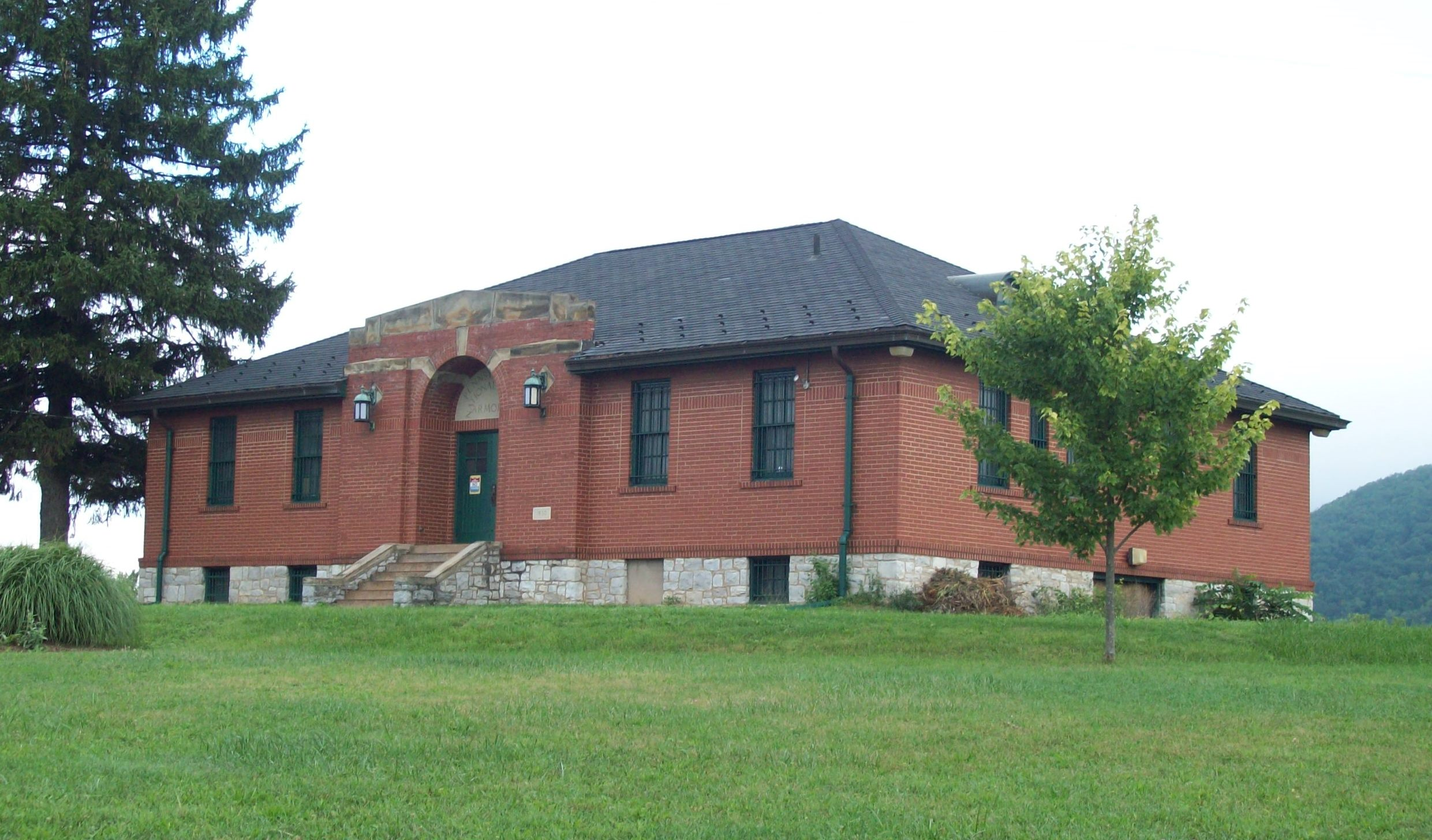
- Bellefonte Armory, August 2010

- Location within Pennsylvania Location within the United States
- Location: E. Bishop St., Bellefonte, Pennsylvania
- Coordinates: 40°54′55″N 77°45′25″W
- Area: 7.9 acres (3.2 ha)
- Built: 1930
- Built by: Tidlow Brothers
- Architect: Kuntz, Joseph F.
- Architectural style: Colonial Revival
- MPS: Pennsylvania National Guard Armories MPS
- NRHP reference No.: 89002068
- Added to NRHP: December 22, 1989

Bellefonte Armory is a historic National Guard armory located at Bellefonte, Centre County, Pennsylvania, United States. It was built in 1930, and consists of an administration building and stable building executed in the Colonial Revival style. Both buildings are constructed of brick and have slate hipped roofs.

It was designed by American architect Joseph F. Kuntz.

It was added to the National Register of Historic Places in 1989.
