= Berwick Armory =

- U.S. National Register of Historic Places
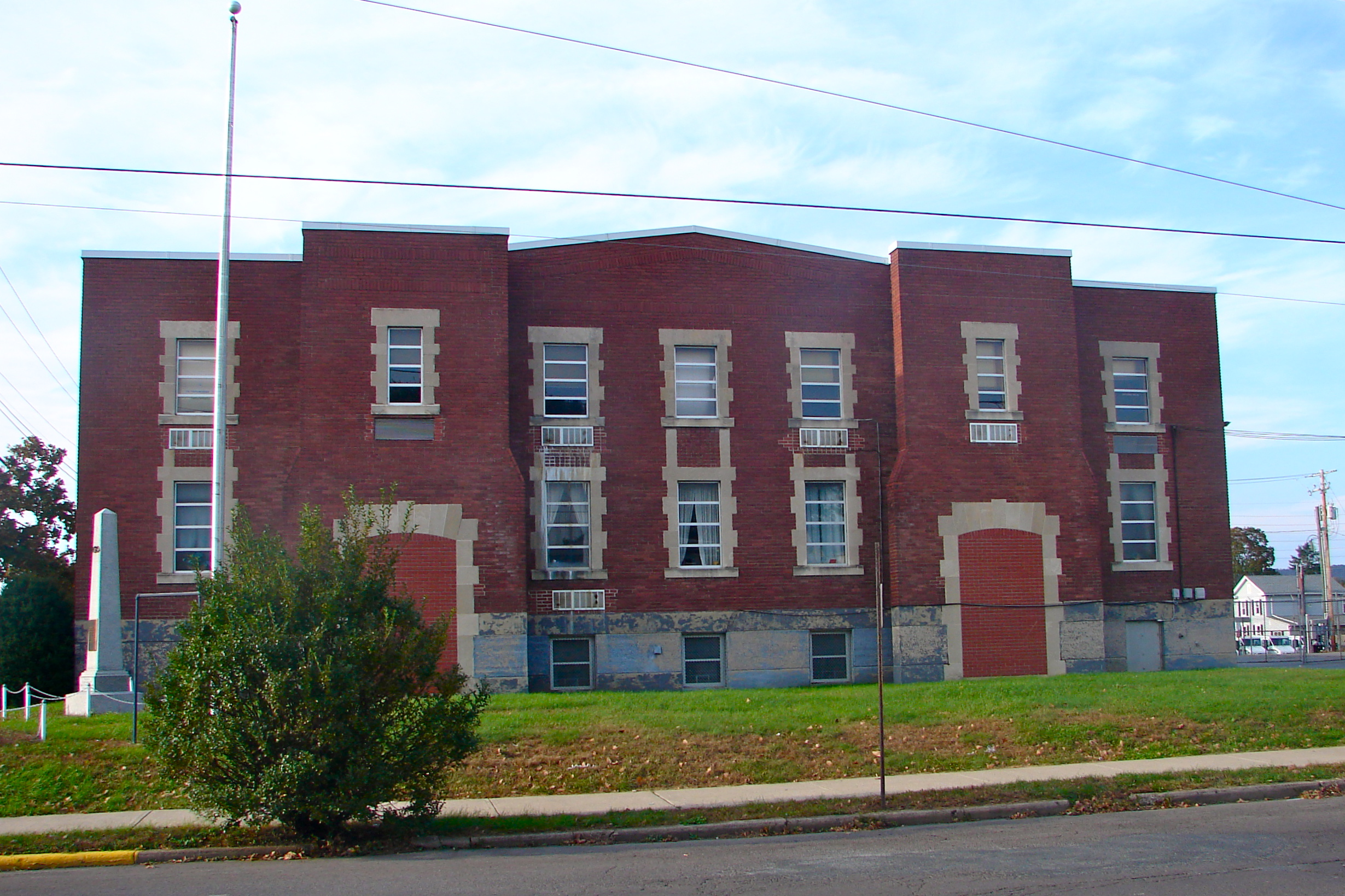
- Berwick Armory, October 2011

- Location within Pennsylvania Location within the United States
- Location: 201 Pine St., Berwick, Pennsylvania
- Coordinates: 41°3′28″N 76°14′1″W
- Area: 0.8 acres (0.32 ha)
- Built: 1922
- Architect: Wilkins, W.G., Co.; Kuntz, Joseph F.
- Architectural style: Bungalow/craftsman, Tudor Revival
- MPS: Pennsylvania National Guard Armories MPS
- NRHP reference No.: 91001692
- Added to NRHP: November 14, 1991

Berwick Armory, also known as the Brigadier General Edward L. Davis Armory, is a historic National Guard armory located at Berwick, Columbia County, Pennsylvania. It is a T-shaped brick building on a stone foundation. The one-story Tudor Revival-style drill hall was built in 1922. The drill hall has a gambrel roof. The two-story American Craftsman-style administrative section was added in 1930. The armory measures 7,500 square feet.

It was added to the National Register of Historic Places in 1991.

== Gallery ==
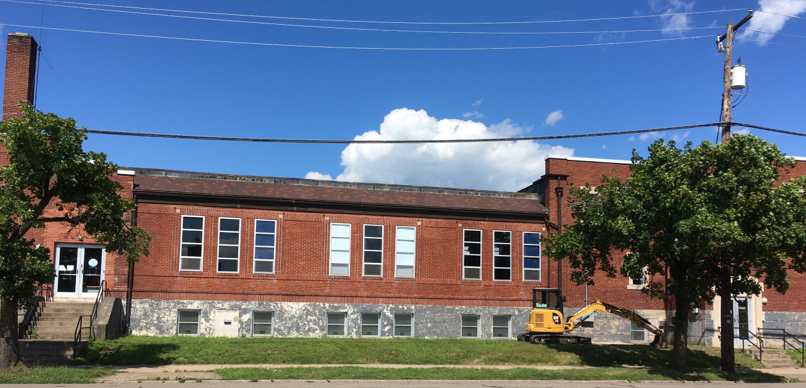
Admin section of the armory
