= Hartley-Rose Belting Company Building =

- U.S. National Register of Historic Places
- U.S. Historic district – Contributing property
- Pittsburgh Landmark – PHLF
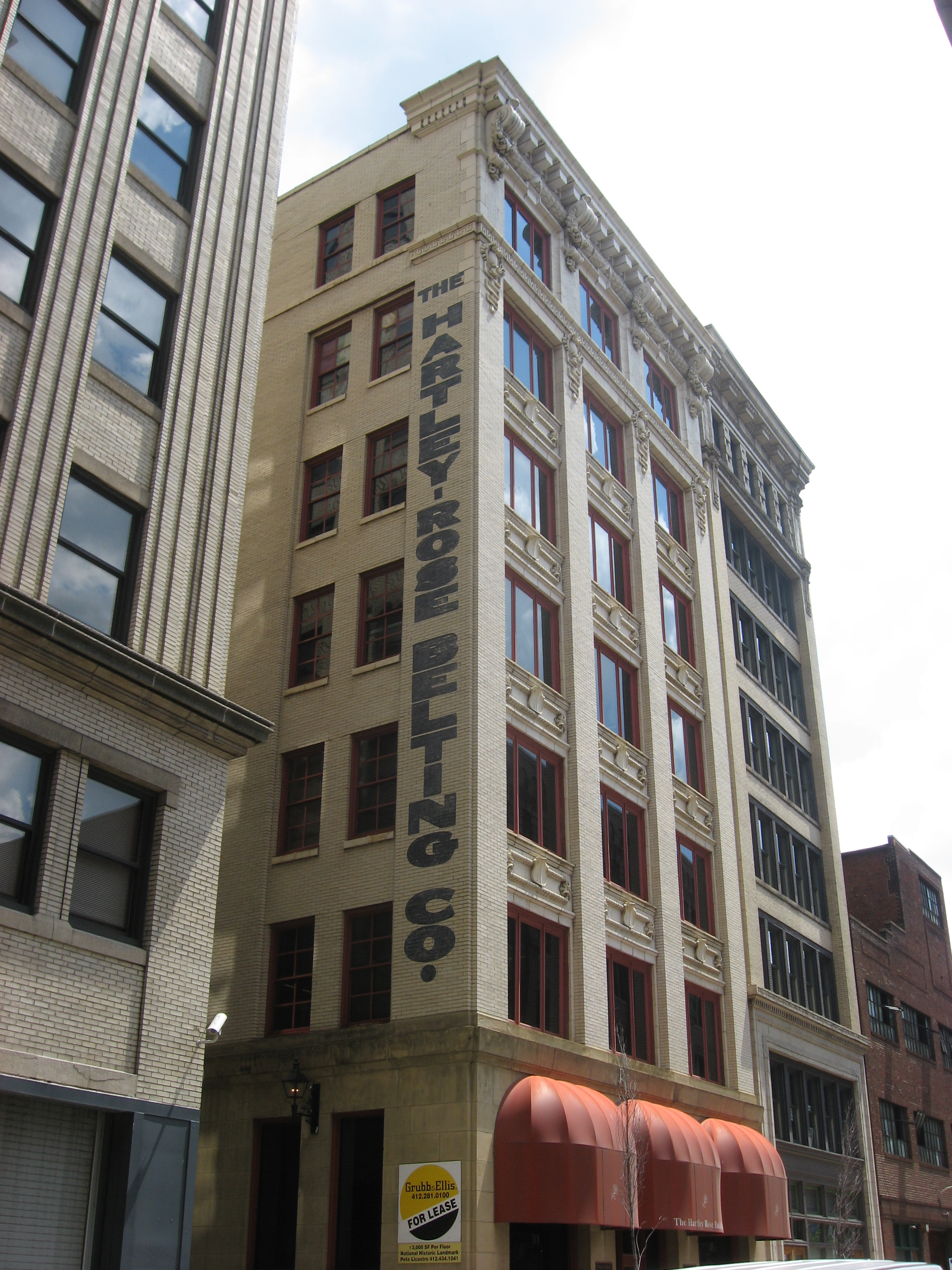

- Location within Pittsburgh Location within Pennsylvania Location within the United States
- Location: 425-427 1st Ave., Pittsburgh, Pennsylvania
- Coordinates: 40°26′13″N 79°59′59″W
- Area: 0.1 acres (0.040 ha)
- Built: 1906
- Architect: Golden & Crick; Janssen & Cocken
- Architectural style: Beaux Arts
- Part of: Firstside Historic District (boundary increase) (ID13000248)
- NRHP reference No.: 83002212

Significant dates
- Added to NRHP: August 25, 1983
- Designated CP: May 8, 2013
- Designated PHLF: 1985

The Hartley-Rose Belting Company Building in Pittsburgh, Pennsylvania, is a building from 1906. It was listed on the National Register of Historic Places in 1983. In 2013, it was also listed as a contributing property in the Firstside Historic District.
