= Blairsville Armory =

- U.S. National Register of Historic Places
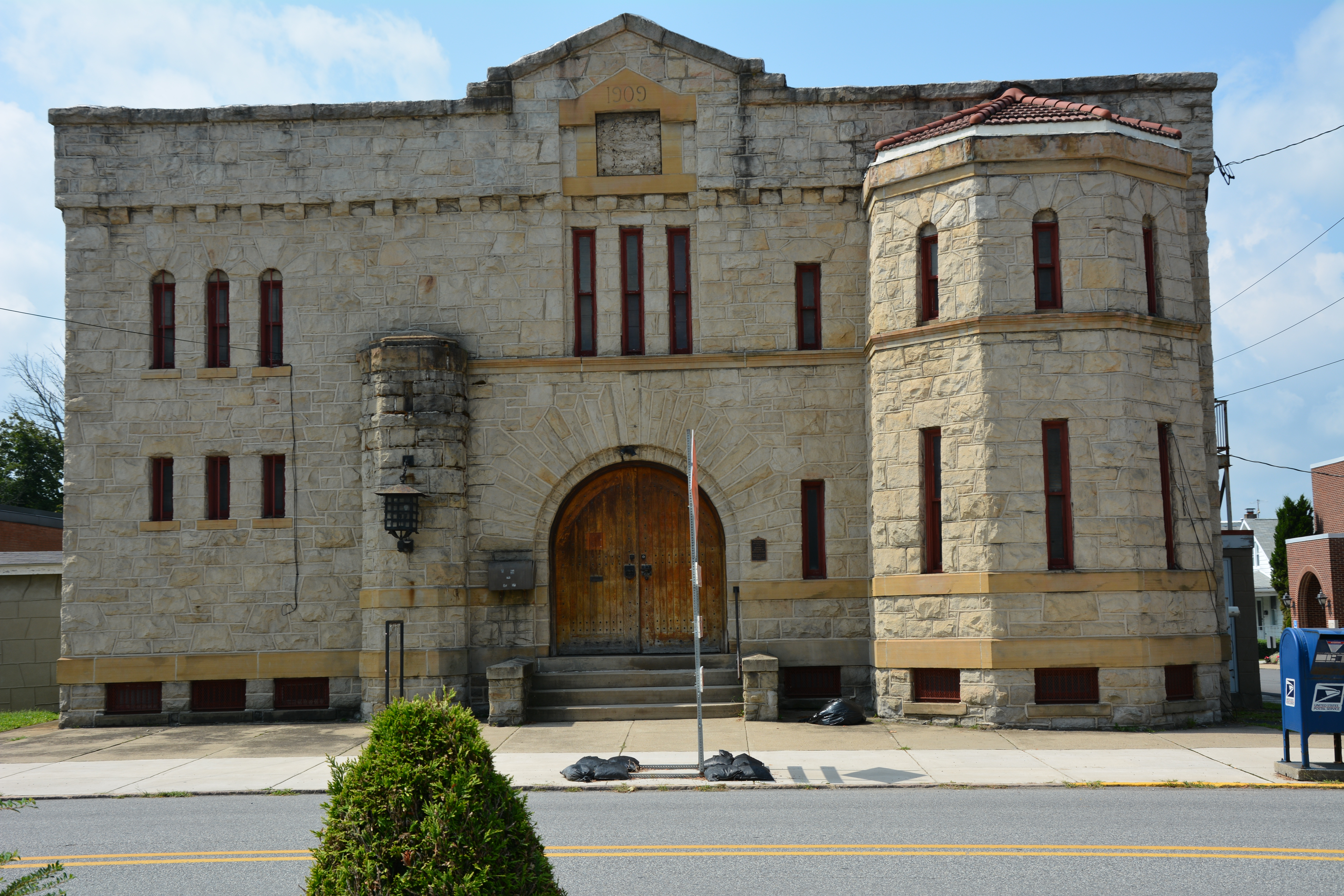

- Location within Pennsylvania Location within the United States
- Location: 119 N. Walnut St., Blairsville, Pennsylvania
- Coordinates: 40°25′55″N 79°15′54″W
- Area: 0.2 acres (0.081 ha)
- Built: 1909
- Architect: Wilkins, W.G. & Co.; Et al.
- Architectural style: Romanesque
- MPS: Pennsylvania National Guard Armories MPS
- NRHP reference No.: 89002069
- Added to NRHP: December 22, 1989

Blairsville Armory is a historic National Guard armory located at Blairsville, Indiana County, Pennsylvania. It was designed by Pittsburgh architects W.G. Wilkins & Co. It was built in 1909, and is a T-shaped, two-story, three-bay-wide and nine-bay-deep, castle-like building in the Romanesque Revival style. The front section is the flat-roofed administration building, with a gable roofed drill hall behind. Its front facade features a central arched entrance with a five-sided, two-story bay window on the right side.

It was added to the National Register of Historic Places in 1989.
