= Washington Armory =

- U.S. National Register of Historic Places
- Washington County History & Landmarks Foundation Landmark
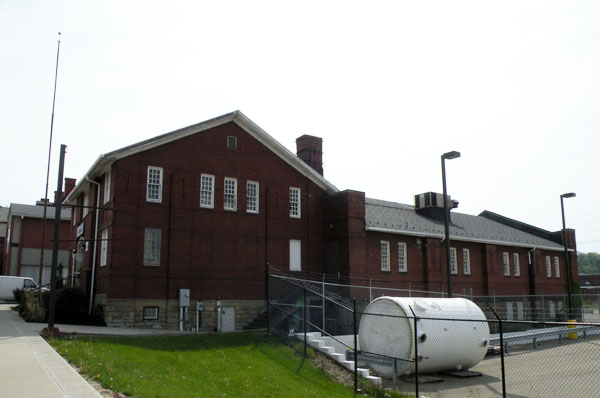
- The Washington Armory in 2010

- Location within Pennsylvania
- Location: 78 West Maiden Street, Washington, Pennsylvania
- Coordinates: 40°10′2.23″N 80°14′47.36″W
- Area: 0.9 acres (0.36 ha)
- Built: 1915
- Architect: W. G. Wilkins Company
- Architectural style: Colonial Revival
- MPS: Pennsylvania National Guard Armories MPS
- NRHP reference No.: 91000520
- Added to NRHP: May 9, 1991

The Washington Armory is a former Pennsylvania National Guard armory in Washington, Pennsylvania. It was designed by W. G. Wilkins Company. It was listed on the National Register of Historic Places on May 9, 1991.

It is designated as a historic public landmark by the Washington County History & Landmarks Foundation.

== History ==
The armory was sold by the Pennsylvania Department of Military and Veterans Affairs to a private individual in 1997. It was converted into Julian's Banquet Hall.

== See also ==
- National Register of Historic Places listings in Washington County, Pennsylvania
