= Engine Company No. 1 and No. 30 =

Historic building in Pennsylvania, United States

- U.S. Historic district – Contributing property
- Pittsburgh Historic Designation
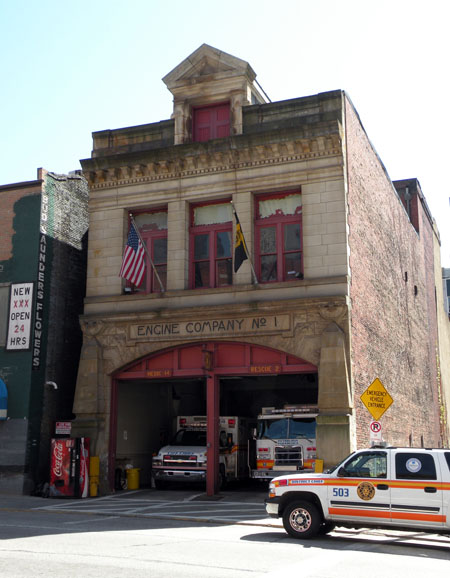
- The building in 2010

- Location within Pittsburgh Location within Pennsylvania Location within the United States
- Location: 344 Boulevard of the Allies, Pittsburgh, Pennsylvania, USA
- Coordinates: 40°26′16.09″N 80°0′2.38″W
- Built: 1900
- Part of: Firstside Historic District (boundary increase) (ID13000248)

Significant dates
- Designated CP: May 8, 2013
- Designated CPHD: March 17, 1993

Engine Company No. 1 and Engine Company No. 30 are historic structures located in Pittsburgh, Pennsylvania. No. 1 is located at 344 Boulevard of the Allies in downtown Pittsburgh while No. 30 is located directly behind it, on the other side of the building, at 341 First Avenue. Built around 1900 by architect William Y. Brady, the Boulevard of the Allies facade is Beaux Arts and Classical in design, and the First Avenue facade mixes Romanesque and Classical styles. Both were added to the List of City of Pittsburgh historic designations (together, as a single listing) on March 17, 1993. In 2013, the building was listed as a contributing property in the Firstside Historic District.

In 2011 the city sold the closed station to Point Park University.

The station is currently in use by Pittsburgh Bureau of EMS. It houses Medic 14 and Rescue 2.
