= 109–115 Wood Street =

- U.S. National Register of Historic Places
- U.S. Historic district – Contributing property
- Pittsburgh Landmark – PHLF
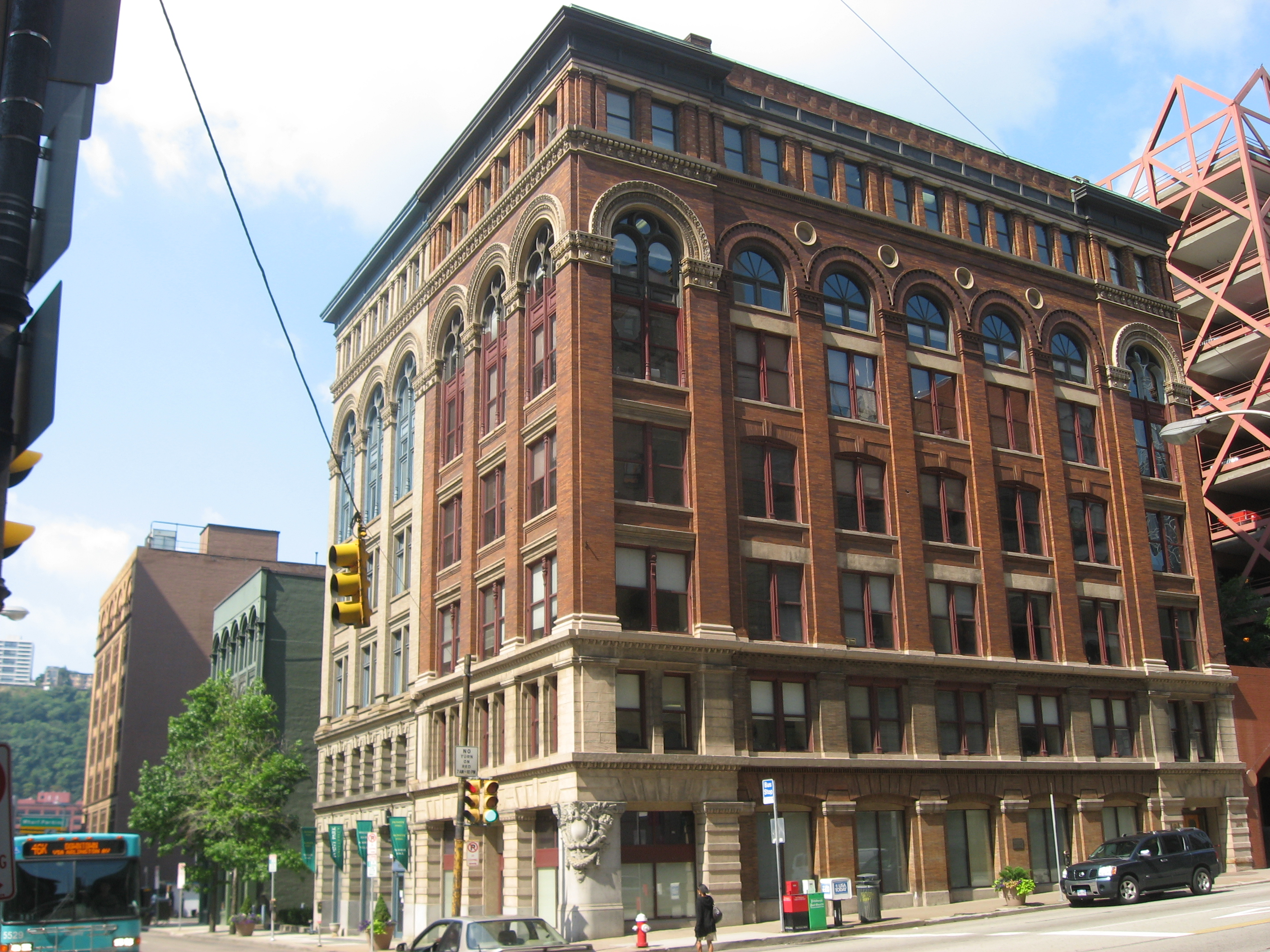

- Location within Pittsburgh Location within Pennsylvania Location within the United States
- Location: 109–115 Wood St.,, Pittsburgh, Pennsylvania
- Coordinates: 40°26′18″N 80°0′9″W
- Built: 1897 (109/111) and 1902 (113/115)
- Architect: Charles Bickel
- Architectural style: Renaissance Revival
- Part of: Firstside Historic District (boundary increase) (ID13000248)
- NRHP reference No.: 96000378

Significant dates
- Added to NRHP: April 4, 1996
- Designated CP: May 8, 2013
- Designated PHLF: 1975

109–115 Wood Street (also known as Hartje Bros. Paper Manufacturing Co. or the Pittsburgh Ballet Theater Building) are two buildings located in Downtown Pittsburgh, Pennsylvania.

== Description and history ==
109–111 was built in 1897, and 113–115 was built in 1902, and both buildings were designed by American architect was Charles Bickel.

The buildings were added to the List of Pittsburgh History and Landmarks Foundation Historic Landmarks in 1975, and added to the National Register of Historic Places on April 4, 1996. They were included in the boundary increase of Firstside Historic District on May 8, 2013.
