= Mamaux Building =

American historic building in Pennsylvania

- U.S. Historic district – Contributing property
- Pittsburgh Historic Designation
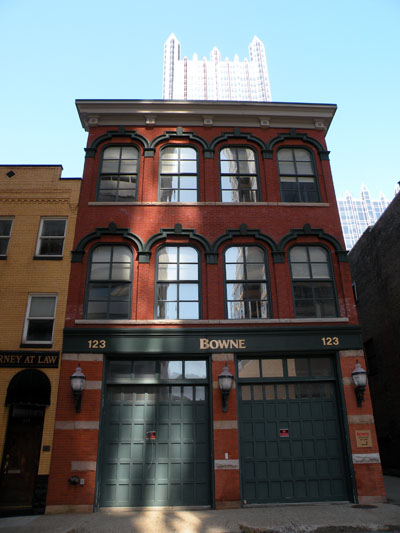
- The building in 2010

- Location within Pittsburgh Location within Pennsylvania Location within the United States
- Location: 123 First Avenue, Pittsburgh, Pennsylvania, USA
- Coordinates: 40°26′20.14″N 80°0′16.81″W
- Built: 1858
- Part of: Firstside Historic District (boundary increase) (ID13000248)

Significant dates
- Designated CP: May 8, 2013
- Designated CPHD: July 27, 1995

Mamaux Building (formerly Fulton and Arnold) is located at 123 First Avenue in downtown Pittsburgh, Pennsylvania, was built circa 1865. The Italianate style building was added to the List of City of Pittsburgh historic designations on July 27, 1995. In 2013, the building was listed as a contributing property in the Firstside Historic District.

== History ==
The building originally housed the Fulton & Sons brass foundry, which specialized in bells "of all sizes, from the tiny little tea bell, weighing a few ounces, up to the monster church bell weighing 20,000 pounds." The company was established in 1832 by Andrew Fulton and was doing business at the present location—70 Second Avenue, later renumbered to 120—by 1836. The foundry was damaged or destroyed in the Great Fire of 1845, but was rebuilt.

According to the National Register of Historic Places nomination for the Firstside Historic District, the present building was constructed in 1858, while the Pittsburgh History and Landmarks Foundation gave a date of 1865. In 1879, the foundry was described as consisting of "two large brick buildings three-stories high, and respectively 35×80 and 70×80 feet with frontages on First and Second avenues."

In 1892 the city of Pittsburgh leased the foundry property, which by then was no longer in use, with plans to turn the buildings into a fire station. Architect Charles Bickel took on the remodeling project. As the Pittsburgh Post reported,

The old Fulton foundry, out of which the new engine houses have been constructed, would not now be recognized by its best friend. It has been completely changed, and in some portions—especially on the Second avenue side—has been torn down altogether. Two engine companies will be quartered in it. On First avenue the structure is four stories high; on Second, which is the entirely new part, there are only two stories. In the latter the first story is stone and the second brick. When the buildings are done it is said there will be no finer engine houses in the city.

Engine Company No. 18 is to occupy the First avenue side. On this building is to be erected the hose tower which is designed to be larger than that of any engine house in the city. It will rise 25 feet above the roof of the building, and will be big enough to hold all the hose in the city. The company that will be quartered in the Second avenue side of the building numbers 19. Here there will be an engine and truck, as in the other. The building stretches through between the two avenues along Chancery lane. In the middle is to be located the new ladder truck.

The completed station was put into service by the Pittsburgh Bureau of Fire in November, 1892.
