= Ford City Armory =

- U.S. National Register of Historic Places
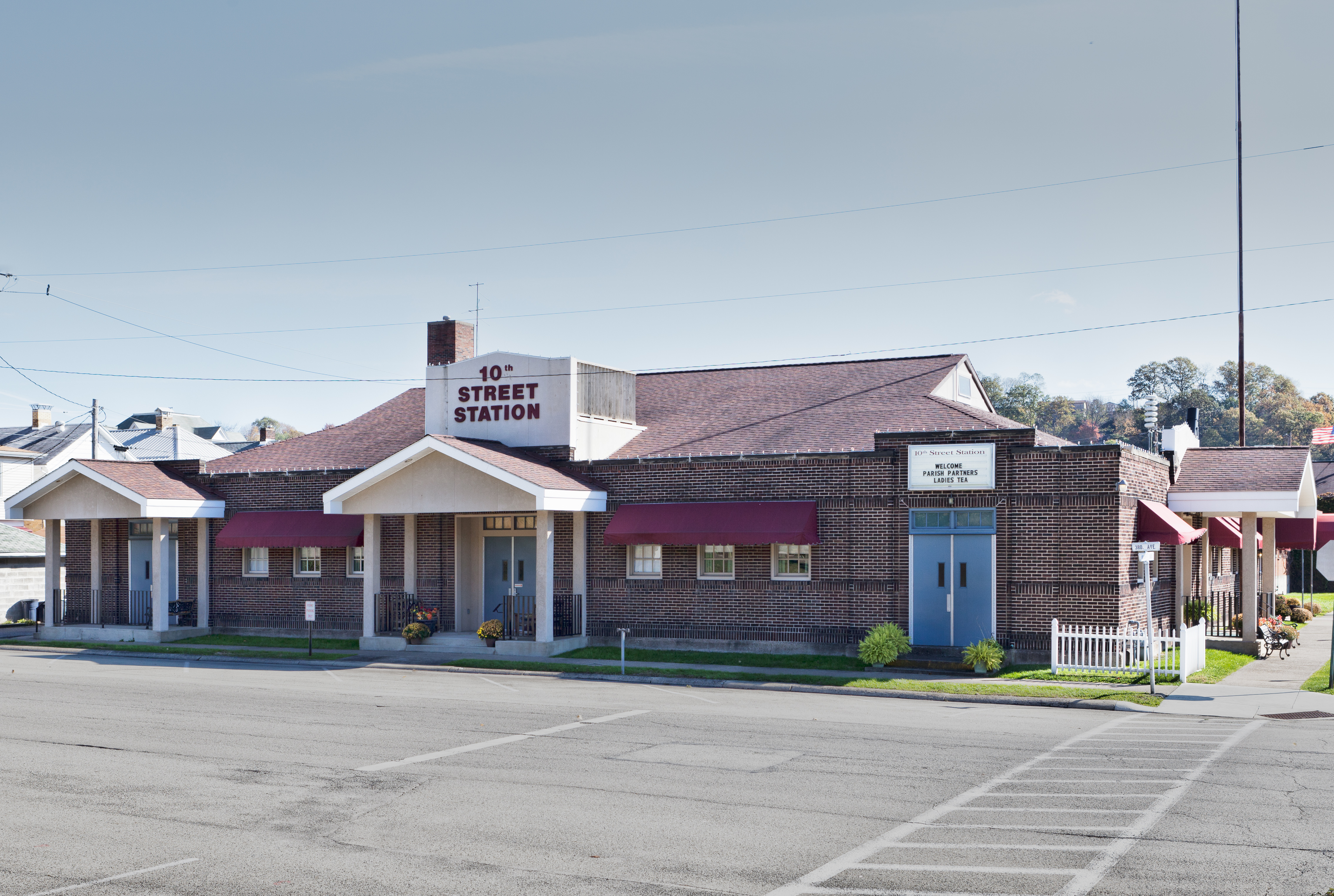

- Location within Pennsylvania Location within the United States
- Location: 301 Tenth St., Ford City, Pennsylvania
- Coordinates: 40°46′18″N 79°31′55″W
- Area: 0.3 acres (0.12 ha)
- Built: 1930
- Built by: Hatten, Clyde
- Architect: Kuntz, Joseph F.
- Architectural style: Moderne
- MPS: Pennsylvania National Guard Armories MPS
- NRHP reference No.: 89002074
- Added to NRHP: December 22, 1989

The Ford City Armory is a historic National Guard armory located at 301 Tenth Street in Ford City, Armstrong County, Pennsylvania. It was designed by architect Joseph F. Kuntz. It was built in 1930. It is a work of builder Clyde Hatten.

It is a one-story, "T"-plan building in Moderne style. It is 10 bays by 9 bays, sits on a cement foundation, and has a hipped roof.

It was listed on the National Register of Historic Places in 1989.

The building was sold in 1996. It now hosts the Pennsylvania National Guard Military Museum.
