= Scottdale Armory =

- U.S. National Register of Historic Places
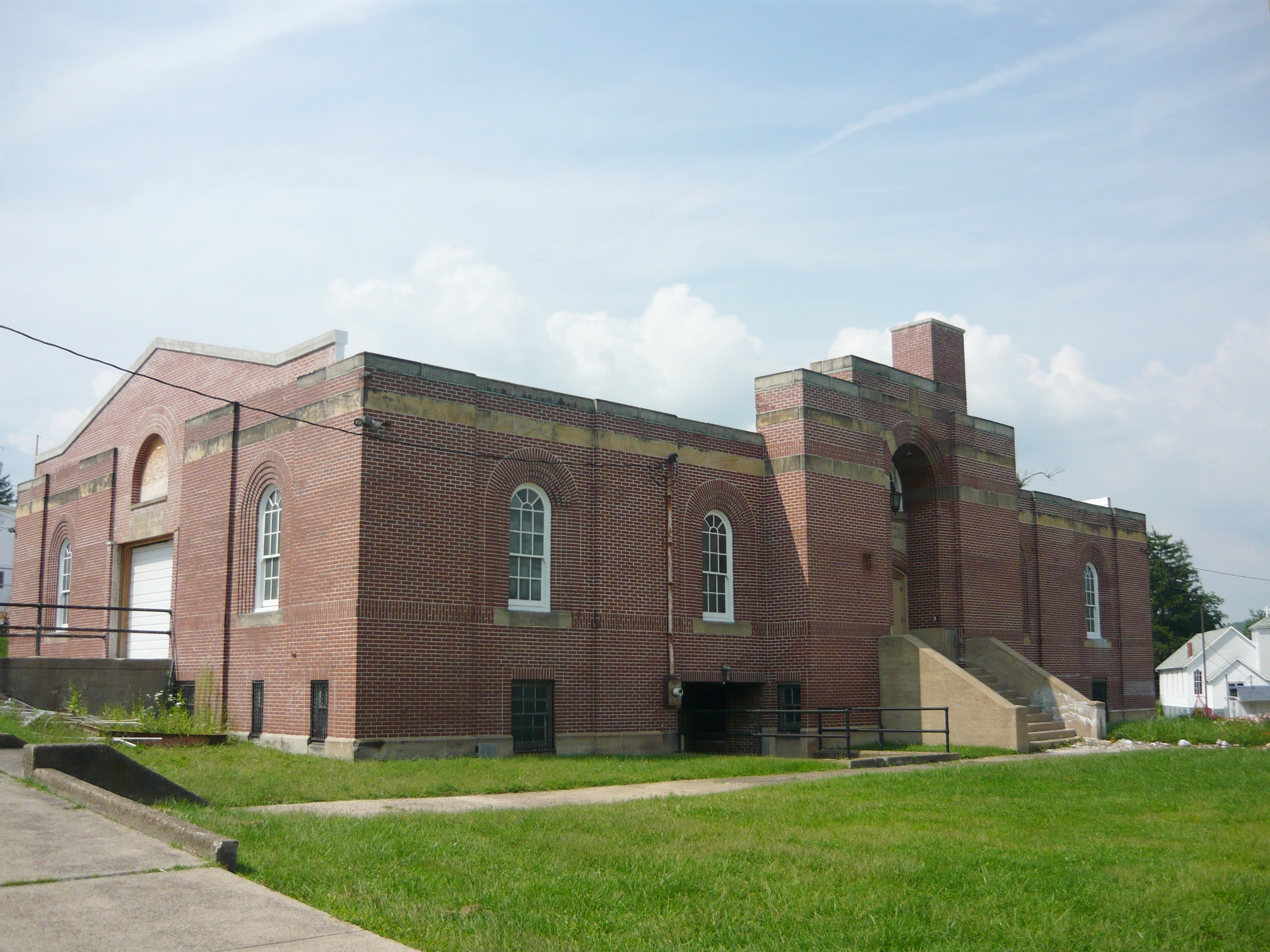
- Scottdale Armory, August 2011

- Location within Pennsylvania Location within the United States
- Location: 501 N. Broadway St., Scottdale, Pennsylvania
- Coordinates: 40°6′17″N 79°35′8″W
- Area: 0.7 acres (0.28 ha)
- Built: 1929
- Architect: Kuntz, Joseph F.
- Architectural style: Art Deco
- MPS: Pennsylvania National Guard Armories MPS
- NRHP reference No.: 91000518
- Added to NRHP: May 9, 1991

The Scottdale Armory is an historic National Guard armory that is located in Scottdale, Westmoreland County, Pennsylvania.

It was added to the National Register of Historic Places in 1991.

== History and architectural features ==
Built in 1929, this historic structure is a one-story, rectangular, brick building that was designed in the Art Deco style. The administrative area is located on the basement level, with the drill hall on the first floor. A one-story brick annex was added circa 1950. It was designed by architect Joseph F. Kuntz.
