= Guckenheimer Warehouse =

- U.S. Historic district – Contributing property
- Pittsburgh Historic Designation
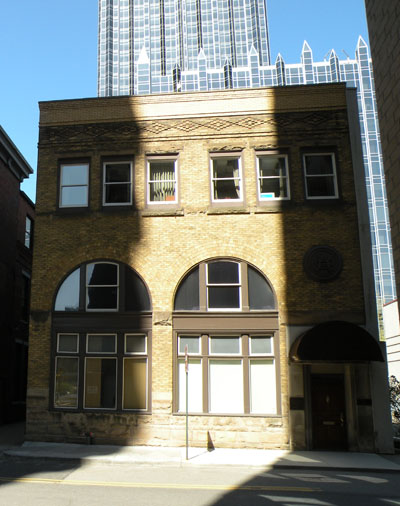
- The building in 2010

- Location within Pittsburgh Location within Pennsylvania Location within the United States
- Location: 125 First Avenue, Pittsburgh, Pennsylvania, USA
- Coordinates: 40°26′19.97″N 80°0′16.32″W
- Built: circa 1882
- Part of: Firstside Historic District (boundary increase) (ID13000248)

Significant dates
- Designated CP: May 8, 2013
- Designated CPHD: May 9, 1995

The Guckenheimer Warehouse, or the former Guckenheimer Whiskey Warehouse, is located at 125 First Avenue in the Downtown neighborhood of Pittsburgh, Pennsylvania. The building served as the warehouse for the Guckenheimer Whiskey, which was distilled in Freeport, Pennsylvania, until prohibition caused the company to shut down.

== History ==
The first mention of the lot on which the current building sits was in 1786 when it was sold by John Penn, the grandson of William Penn, to John Wilkins. The lot was sold again in 1821 via sherif's sale to a group of men that included William Eichbaum, the iron manufacturer. The building or buildings on the property were destroyed during the Great Fire of 1845.

The current building on the lot is believed to have been constructed in 1852 by the Eichbaum owners group. The property was sold in 1855 at Sheriff's sale to Isaac Parker. Issac Parker, in turn, sold the lot and a building described as a 3-story brick store house in September of 1863 to Asher Guckenheimer & Brothers.

A. Guckenheimer & Brothers operated the current building as a warehouse and office for their whiskey company, A. Guckenheimer & Bros. The Guckenheimer Whiskey company was first established in 1857 by Asher Guckenheimer and his half-brother, Samuel Wertheimer. They originally bought their liquor from Thomas Bell, who had been making a highly regarded product since 1845 in Freeport.

Following Bell's death in 1865, they bought his distillery and enlarged it, but the demand outpaced production so they bought a new and much larger facility in 1866. Guckenheimer's Rye became one of the country's most famous brands, scoring a 99 out of 100 at the Columbian Exposition in Chicago, and winning top honors in 1893. The building at 125 1st Ave. underwent a significant renovation in 1894 under the direction of architects McBride and McCook that resulted in the addition of the current facade. A. Guckenheimer & Brothers continuously occupied the building until the company disbanded due to prohibition.

After Asher Guckenheimer's death, the company changed hands several times. Although new owners attempted to continue to sell the whiskey in 1925, despite prohibition, they were ultimately stopped from doing so when the corporation and thirteen of its workers were indicted on charges relating to conspiring to obtain the release of a large quantity of whiskey from bond to sell and deliver it unlawfully. Found guilty, the company was forced to sell its warehouse to the Landau Brothers Contracting and Building Company, which then owned the building until it was sold in 1980 to Paddington Associates. Paddington Associates subsequently leased the building to the Stonecipher Law Firm, who occupied the building until June 2024. It was sold in November 2024 to the current owners.

The building was nominated in November 1994 to become a City Historic Site by Preservation Pittsburgh. It received that designation in June 1995. In 2013, the building was listed as a contributing property in the Firstside Historic District.

== Architecture ==
The building with its 1894 facade was designed in the Richardsonian Romanesque architectural style. It is one of the best surviving structures in the Market Street commercial district, and is an example of heavy timber construction in a commercial building. The high ceilings, massive wood beams, and exposed brick are all examples of the building's architectural style, and contribute to it being a rarity in Pittsburgh architecture.

== Gallery ==
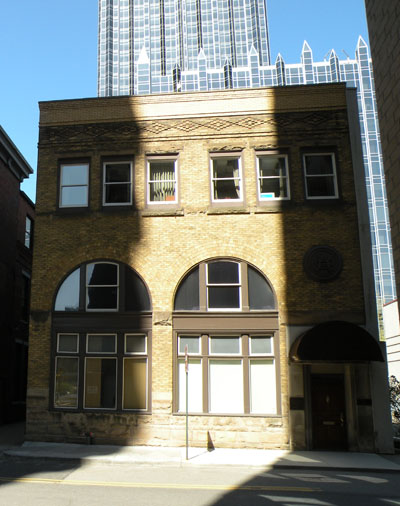
Photo of the Guckenheimer Warehouse building as it stands today

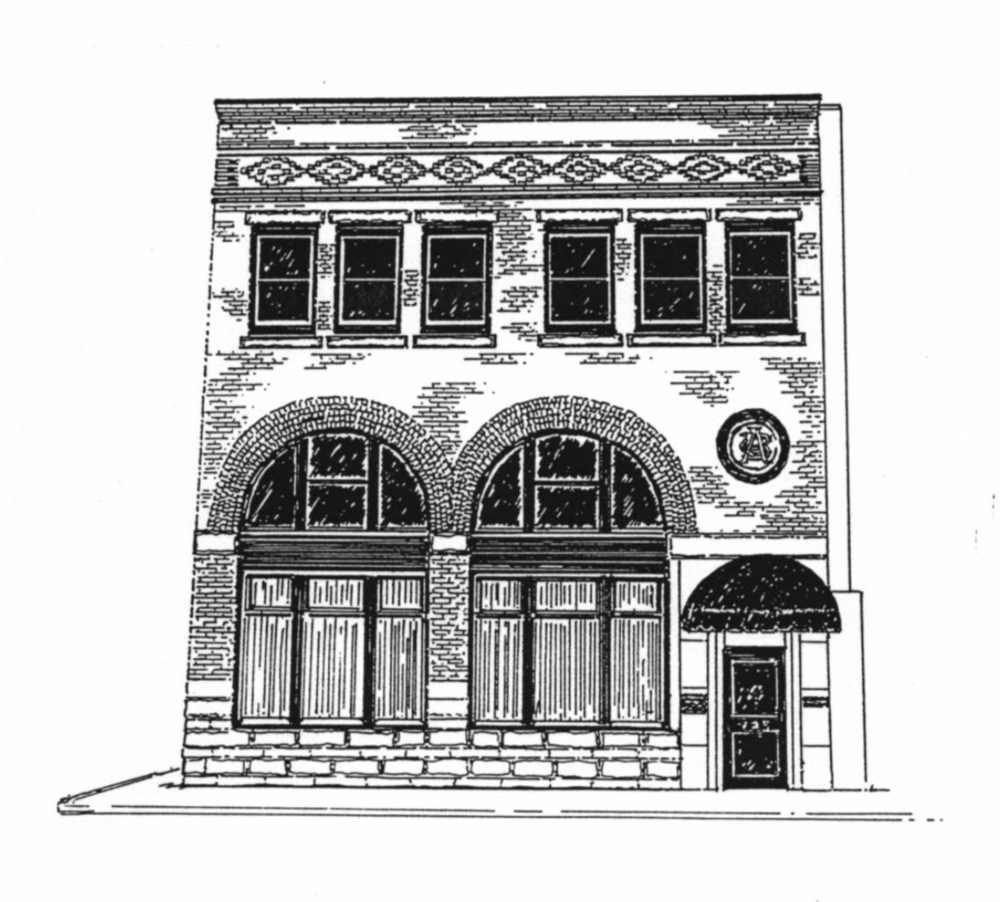
Old sketch of what the Guckenheimer Warehouse looked like

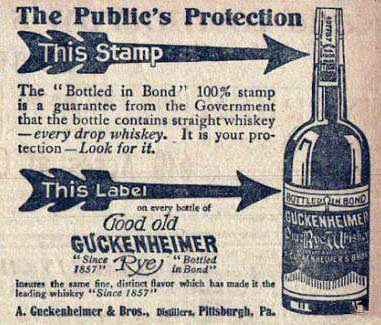
Old advertisement for Guckenheimer Rye in 1907

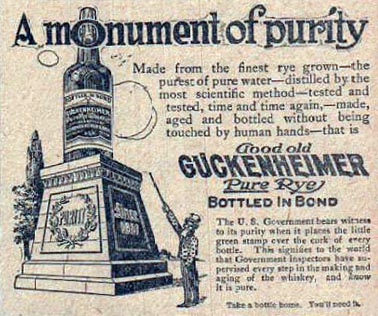
Advertisement celebrating Guckenheimer Pure Rye from 1907

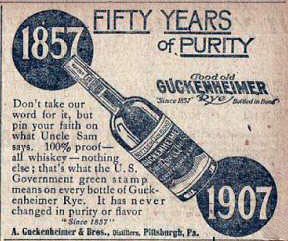
Advertisement celebrating fifty years of Guckenheimer Whiskey from 1907
