= Huntingdon Armory =

- U.S. National Register of Historic Places
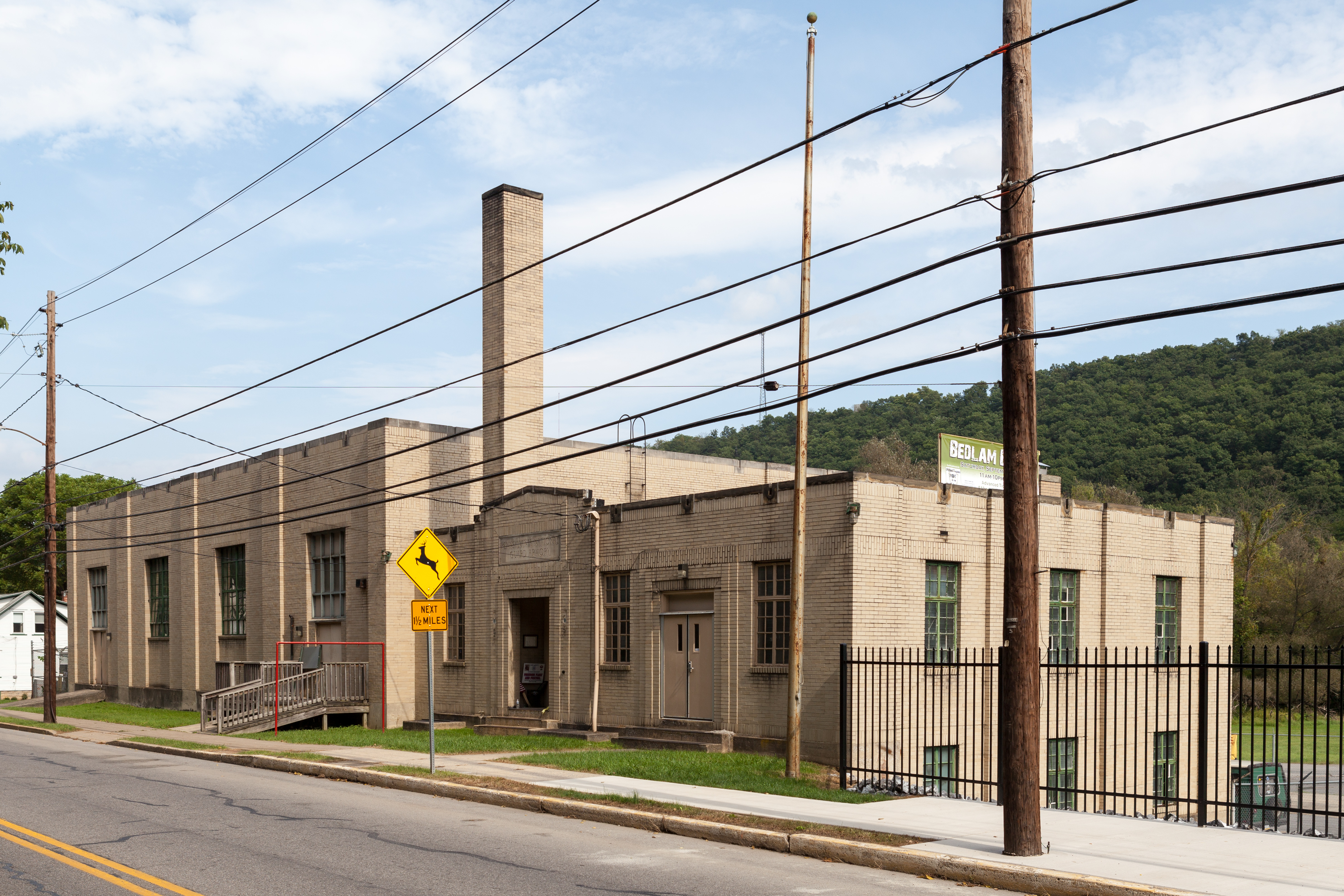
- The Armory in September 2014

- Location within Pennsylvania Location within the United States
- Location: Standing Stone Ave., Huntingdon, Pennsylvania
- Coordinates: 40.48619°N 78.00316°W
- Area: 7.4 acres (3.0 ha)
- Built: 1930, 1937
- Architect: Kuntz, Joseph F.; Et al.
- Architectural style: Moderne
- MPS: Pennsylvania National Guard Armories MPS
- NRHP reference No.: 89002075
- Added to NRHP: December 22, 1989

Huntingdon Armory is a historic National Guard armory located at Huntingdon, Huntingdon County, Pennsylvania. The administration building was built in 1930 and the drill hall in 1937. It is a one-story, T-shaped yellow brick building in the Moderne style.

It was added to the National Register of Historic Places in 1989.
