= Mount Pleasant, Pennsylvania =

Borough in Pennsylvania, US

- Borough
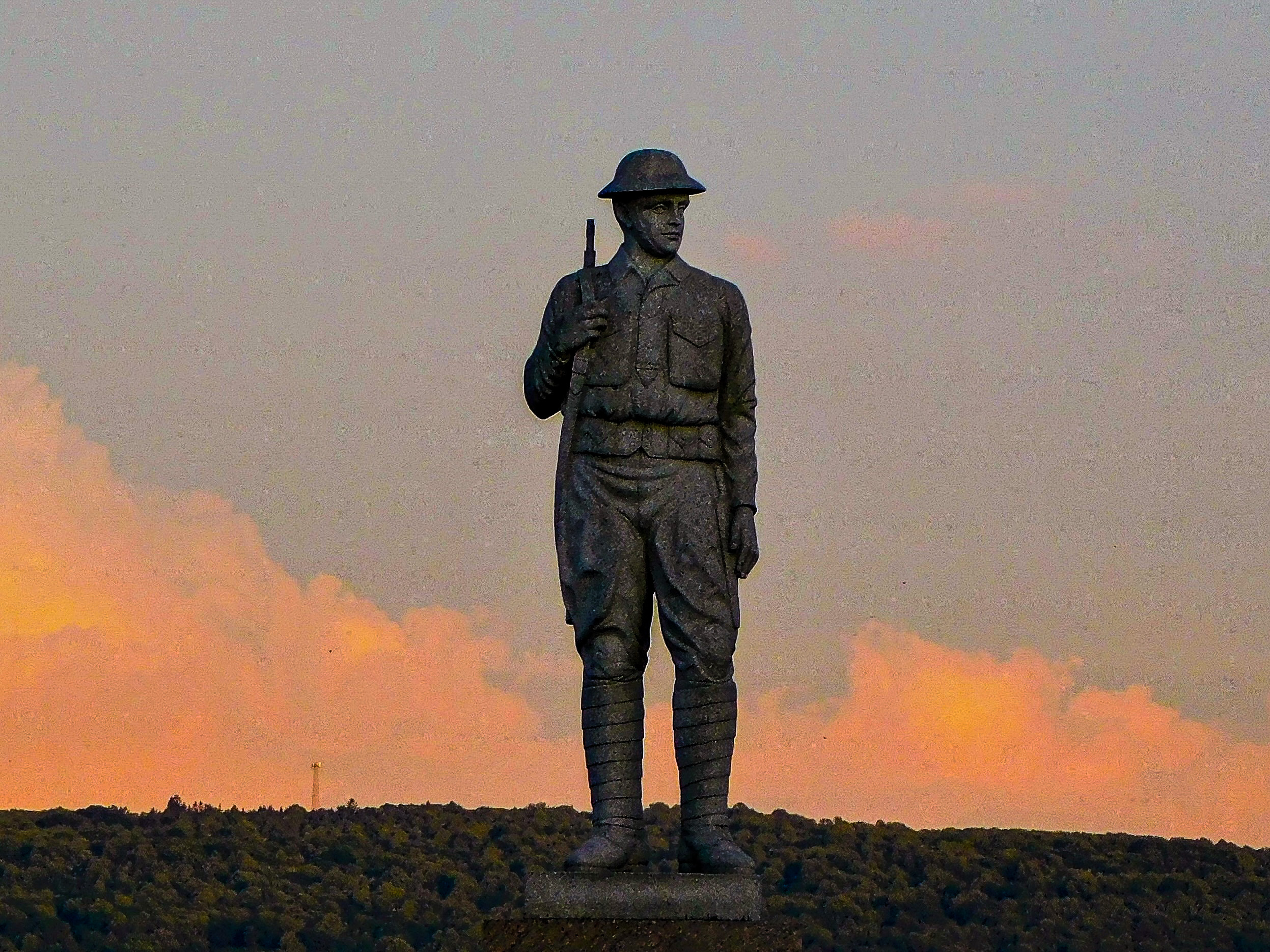
- Doughboy Statue; West Main Street and Diamond Street

- Location of Mount Pleasant in Westmoreland County, Pennsylvania.

- Location within Pennsylvania
- Coordinates: 40°08′59″N 79°32′33″W
- Country: United States
- State: Pennsylvania
- County: Westmoreland
- Settled: 1797
- Incorporated: 1828

Government
  - Type: Borough Council
  - Mayor: Kenneth Phillabaum (D)

Area
  - Total: 1.00 sq mi (2.59 km^{2})
  - Land: 1.00 sq mi (2.59 km^{2})
  - Water: 0 sq mi (0.00 km^{2})
- Elevation: 1,171 ft (357 m)

Population (2020)
  - Total: 4,245
  - Density: 4,240/sq mi (1,637.2/km^{2})
- Time zone: UTC−5 (Eastern (EST))
  - Summer (DST): UTC−4 (EDT)
- ZIP Code: 15666
- FIPS code: 42-51880
- Website: www.mtpleasantboro.com

Mount Pleasant is a borough in Westmoreland County, Pennsylvania, United States. It stands 45 miles (72 km) southeast of Pittsburgh. As of the 2020 census, the borough's population was 4,245.

The Borough of Mount Pleasant, consisting of the town area, should not be confused with Mount Pleasant Township, which is an entirely separate municipality. Mount Pleasant Township is predominantly rural and adjoins the borough to the north.

In the past, Mount Pleasant was a center of an extensive coke-making industry. Other products included flour, lumber, iron, glass, foundry products, etc.

== History ==
Mount Pleasant borough is located at what was originally the junction of two Native American paths. With the coming of Europeans, those two paths—now known as Pennsylvania Routes 31 (east/west) and 819 (north/south)—became key access roads to the western wilderness and more populated areas in the east. The crossroads attracted settlers who established businesses to serve travelers passing through.

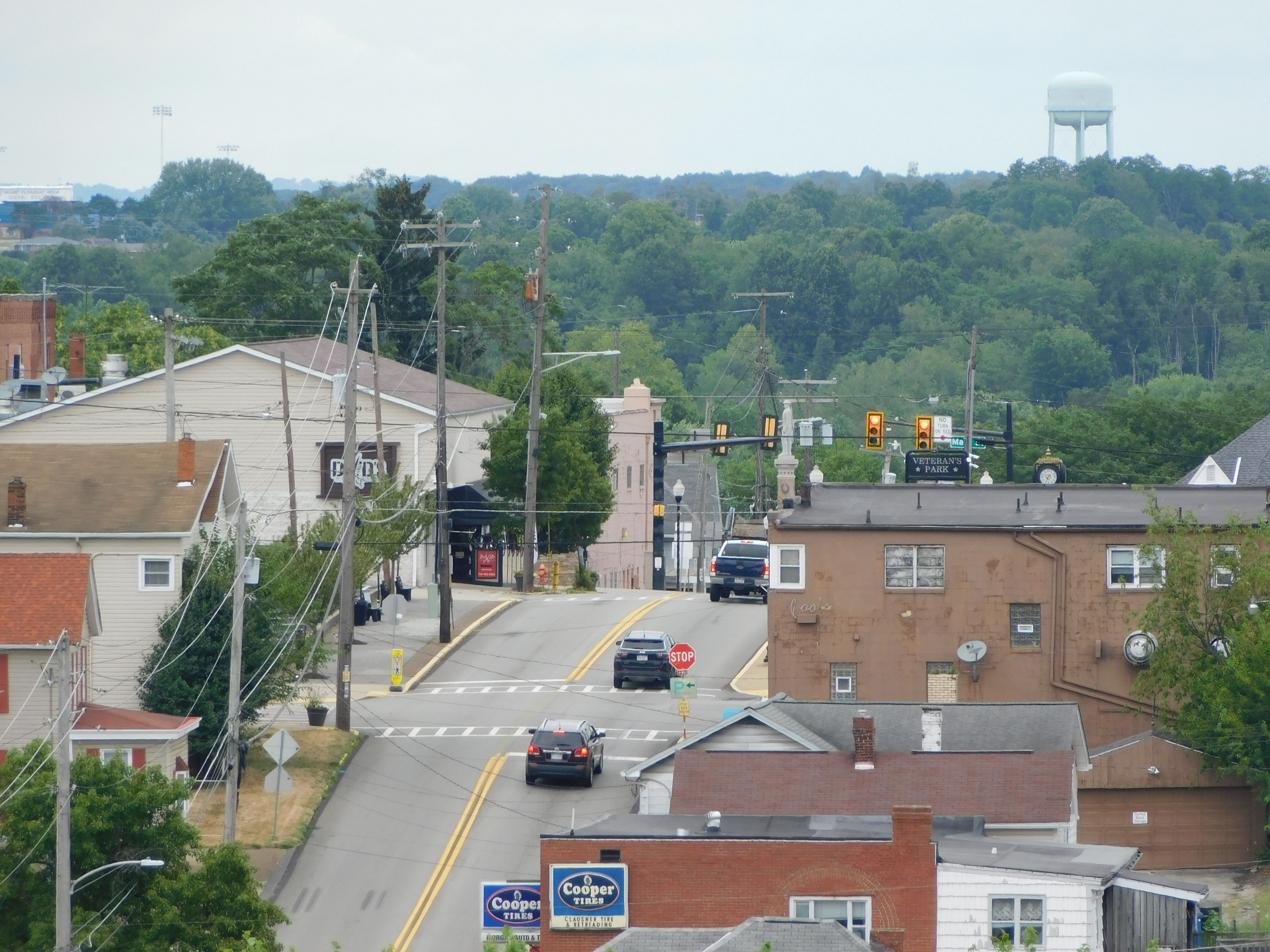
Downtown Mount Pleasant in 2024

The year of Mount Pleasant's first non-Native American Indian resident is not known. The road pioneered by the Braddock expedition passed through the western end of the future town in 1755, opening the area to settlement. One source states that at the time of the American Revolutionary War, there was a settlement of "not more than a half dozen houses." In 1793 Michael Smith was licensed to operate an inn, which would have served traffic on Glades Road (sometimes spelled Glade Road), now Route 31. In 1797, Nathaniel Marshall sold land to Andrew McCready, who laid out the design of the town.

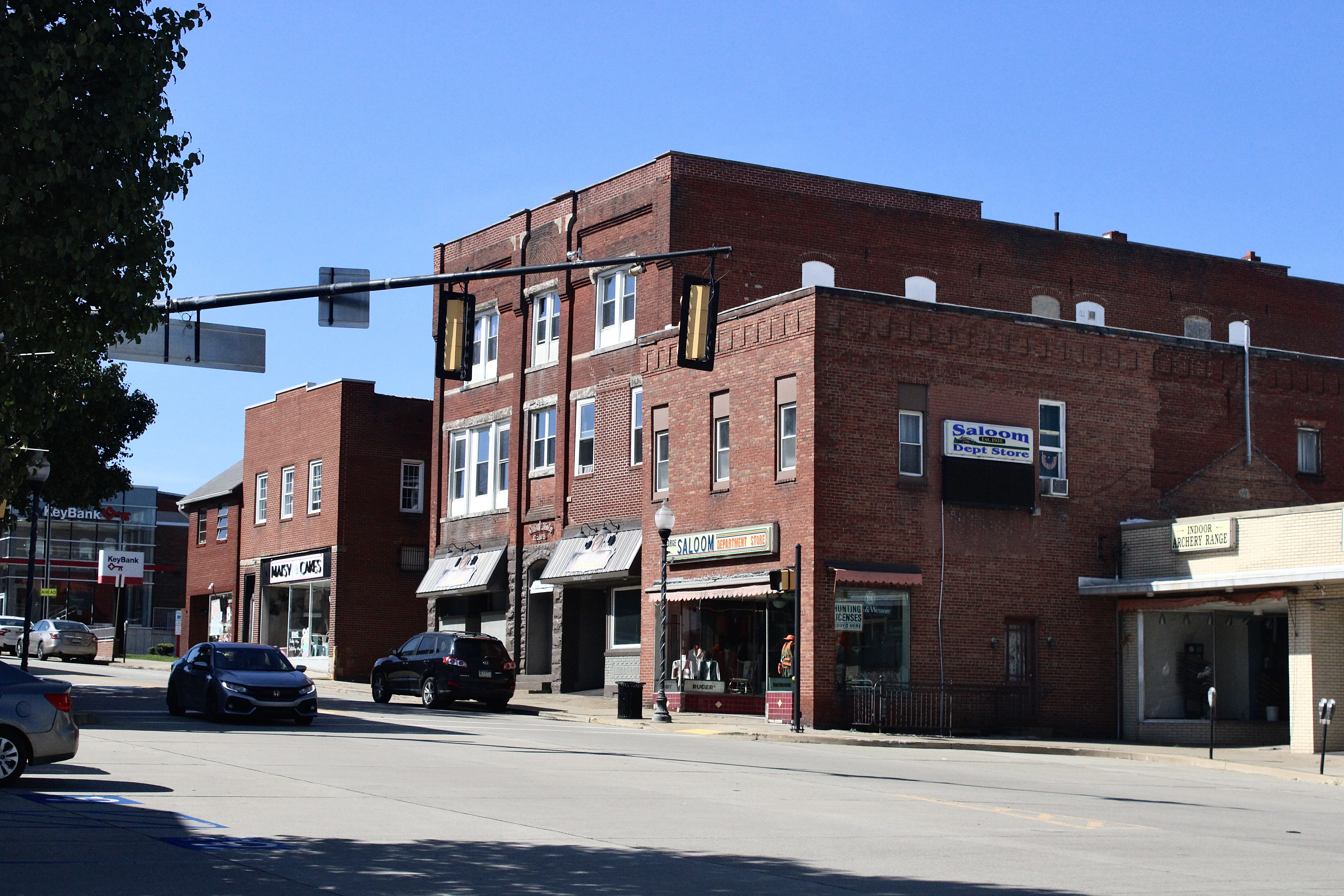
Historic buildings in downtown Mount Pleasant including the Saloom Department Store, Mount Pleasant’s oldest business

Jacob's Creek Bridge, the first iron-chain suspension bridge built in the United States, was erected south of the town in 1801. It was demolished in 1833.

Unfortunately, no pre-1800 structures remain within the borough limits. The borough's three oldest existing buildings all date from approximately 1812: The Shupe House at 201 Main Street, Hitchman House at 355 Main Street, and the Rupert Building at 642-644 Main Street.

Mount Pleasant became a borough on February 7, 1828.

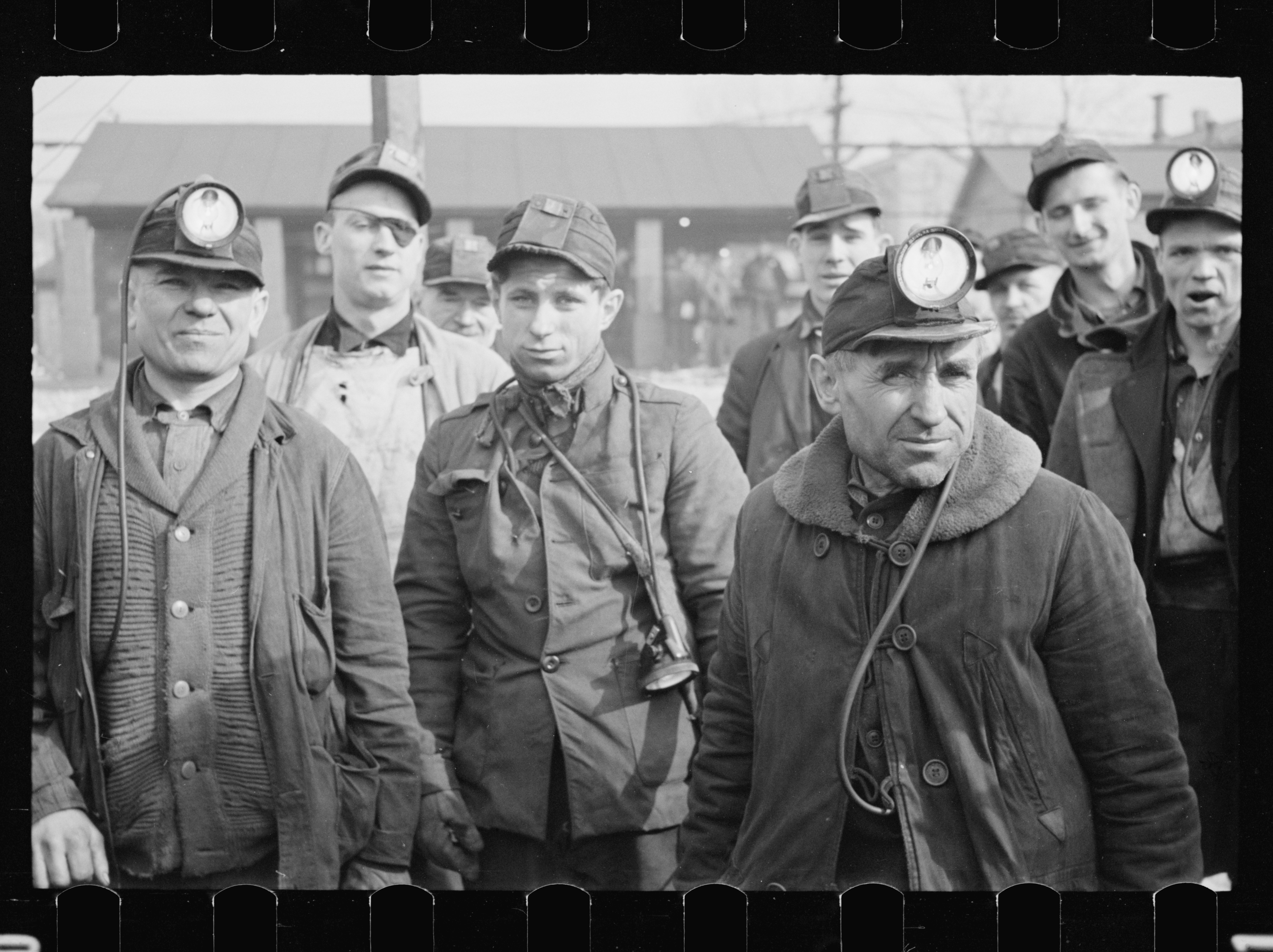
Miners at American Radiator Mine, Mount Pleasant, 1936

Glass manufacturing was a foundation of the local economy, with Bryce Brothers commencing operations in 1850, and L. E. Smith Glass in 1907. The invention of the Bessemer process of steelmaking in 1859, which required coke (fuel), had a dramatic impact on the region. The town prospered as coal deposits were developed, from which coke was made. However, the lives of coal miners in the outlying "patch towns" (company-owned mining towns) were arduous, and labor-management disputes became frequent. The strike in Morewood, west of Mount Pleasant borough, was the most violent of the area's strikes, in which nine miners were killed by sheriff's deputies on April 3, 1891.

Mount Pleasant was disadvantaged when the main lines of the railroads bypassed the community in the 1850s. The community's isolation lessened in 1871 with the opening of the Mount Pleasant and Broadford Railroad, later part of the Baltimore and Ohio Railroad. In addition, a branch line of the Pennsylvania Railroad connected the borough to Scottdale, and West Penn Railways (an interurban trolley) served Mount Pleasant from 1906 to 1952.

The Borough of Mount Pleasant has three listings on the National Register of Historic Places: the Samuel Warden House (1886) at 200 South Church Street, the demolished Mount Pleasant Armory, and the Mount Pleasant Historic District, which encompasses the oldest parts of the borough.

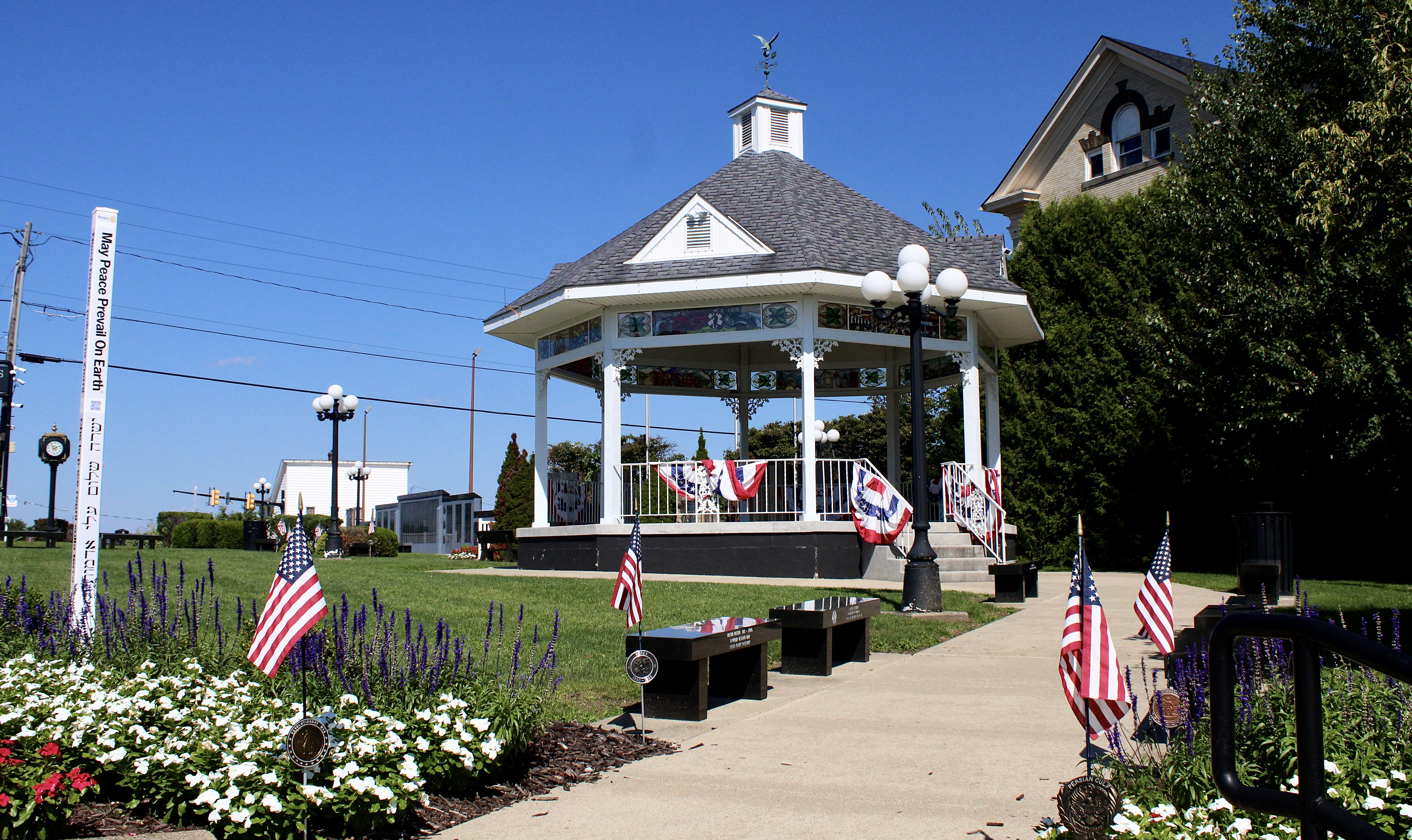
Gazebo at Veteran’s Park

By the early twentieth century, Mount Pleasant had become one of Westmoreland County’s most prosperous industrial boroughs. The local economy was anchored by glass manufacturing, coal extraction, coke production, rail transport, and regional commerce. The borough’s strategic location along transportation corridors allowed it to serve as a commercial hub for surrounding mining settlements and rural farming communities. By 1910, the borough had established itself as one of the principal inland trade centers in south-central Westmoreland County. The eventual closure of L. E. Smith Glass Company in 2004 had roots in industrial pressures that accelerated during these decades, including foreign competition and declining domestic demand for traditional pressed glass manufacturing.

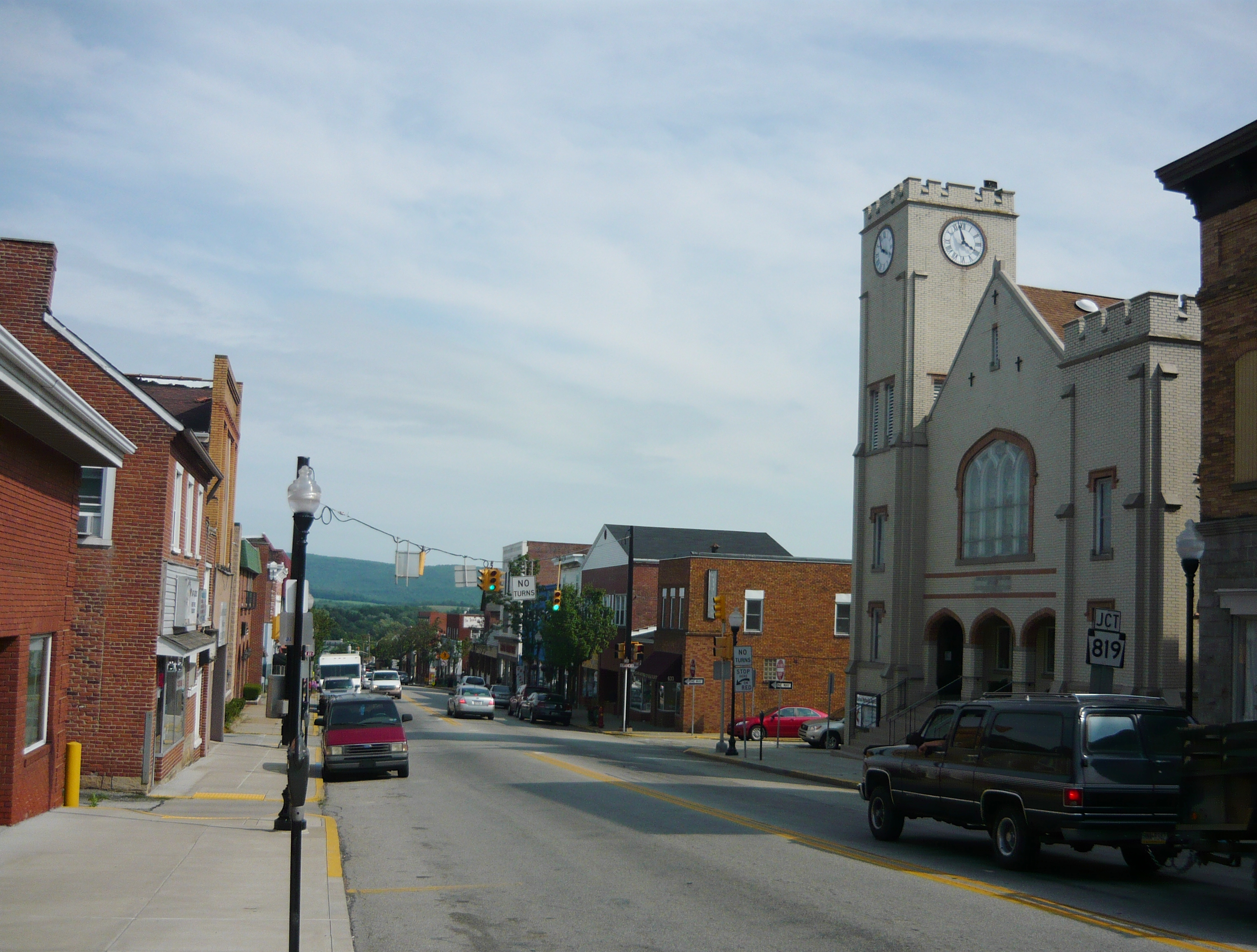
Main Street

Historic preservation efforts began gaining momentum in the late twentieth century as residents sought to protect the borough’s nineteenth- and early twentieth-century architecture. In 1998, the Mount Pleasant Historic District was added to the National Register of Historic Places. Community festivals and Main Street programming sought to preserve local identity amid broader regional economic restructuring. Historic homes such as the Samuel Warden House remained focal points of cultural preservation efforts.

== Geography ==
Mount Pleasant is located at 40°8′59″N 79°32′33″W (40.149847, -79.542609).

According to the United States Census Bureau, the borough has a total area of 1.1 square miles (3.0 km^{2}), all land.

The climate of Mount Pleasant is a humid continental climate (Köppen climate classification: Dfb/Dfa), with four distinct seasons throughout the year and relatively average precipitation.

Climate data for Mount Pleasant (1991–2020 normals, extremes 1991–2011)
Month	Jan	Feb	Mar	Apr	May	Jun	Jul	Aug	Sep	Oct	Nov	Dec	Year
Record high °F (°C)	72 (22)	75 (24)	83 (28)	87 (31)	89 (32)	92 (33)	96 (36)	96 (36)	92 (33)	86 (30)	80 (27)	73 (23)	96 (36)
Mean maximum °F (°C)	62.8 (17.1)	64.2 (17.9)	72.9 (22.7)	82.4 (28.0)	84.4 (29.1)	88.4 (31.3)	89.3 (31.8)	89.8 (32.1)	87.2 (30.7)	79.6 (26.4)	72.6 (22.6)	65.1 (18.4)	90.3 (32.4)
Mean daily maximum °F (°C)	37.4 (3.0)	40.6 (4.8)	50.0 (10.0)	62.2 (16.8)	71.3 (21.8)	78.5 (25.8)	82.1 (27.8)	81.2 (27.3)	75.2 (24.0)	63.7 (17.6)	51.8 (11.0)	42.0 (5.6)	61.3 (16.3)
Daily mean °F (°C)	29.0 (−1.7)	30.8 (−0.7)	38.9 (3.8)	49.3 (9.6)	59.2 (15.1)	67.3 (19.6)	71.1 (21.7)	69.9 (21.1)	63.1 (17.3)	51.8 (11.0)	41.5 (5.3)	33.7 (0.9)	50.5 (10.3)
Mean daily minimum °F (°C)	20.7 (−6.3)	21.0 (−6.1)	27.7 (−2.4)	36.3 (2.4)	47.0 (8.3)	56.1 (13.4)	60.1 (15.6)	58.6 (14.8)	50.9 (10.5)	40.0 (4.4)	31.2 (−0.4)	25.4 (−3.7)	39.6 (4.2)
Mean minimum °F (°C)	−1.1 (−18.4)	2.7 (−16.3)	9.7 (−12.4)	22.4 (−5.3)	31.7 (−0.2)	42.6 (5.9)	48.0 (8.9)	45.8 (7.7)	36.3 (2.4)	25.3 (−3.7)	15.6 (−9.1)	5.3 (−14.8)	−3.1 (−19.5)
Record low °F (°C)	−14 (−26)	−11 (−24)	−3 (−19)	14 (−10)	27 (−3)	35 (2)	43 (6)	41 (5)	33 (1)	20 (−7)	6 (−14)	−3 (−19)	−14 (−26)
Average precipitation inches (mm)	3.31 (84)	2.24 (57)	3.37 (86)	3.64 (92)	4.27 (108)	4.86 (123)	4.40 (112)	3.96 (101)	3.49 (89)	3.18 (81)	3.44 (87)	3.78 (96)	43.94 (1,116)
Average snowfall inches (cm)	9.0 (23)	7.5 (19)	5.6 (14)	0.3 (0.76)	0.0 (0.0)	0.0 (0.0)	0.0 (0.0)	0.0 (0.0)	0.0 (0.0)	0.1 (0.25)	0.9 (2.3)	6.4 (16)	29.8 (76)
Average precipitation days (≥ 0.01 inch)	15.6	11.9	13.0	14.0	13.8	12.3	12.2	10.6	10.8	9.9	12.0	14.1	150.2
Average snowy days (≥ 0.1 in)	6.5	5.3	2.5	0.4	0.0	0.0	0.0	0.0	0.0	0.1	1.2	4.9	20.9
Source 1: NOAA
Source 2: XMACIS2 (mean maxima and minima 1991–2020)

== Demographics ==
Historical population
Census	Pop.	Note	%±
1840	554		—
1850	534		−3.6%
1860	497		−6.9%
1870	717		44.3%
1880	1,197		66.9%
1890	3,652		205.1%
1900	4,745		29.9%
1910	5,812		22.5%
1920	5,862		0.9%
1930	5,869		0.1%
1940	5,824		−0.8%
1950	5,883		1.0%
1960	6,107		3.8%
1970	5,895		−3.5%
1980	5,354		−9.2%
1990	4,787		−10.6%
2000	4,728		−1.2%
2010	4,454		−5.8%
2020	4,245		−4.7%

=== 2020 census ===
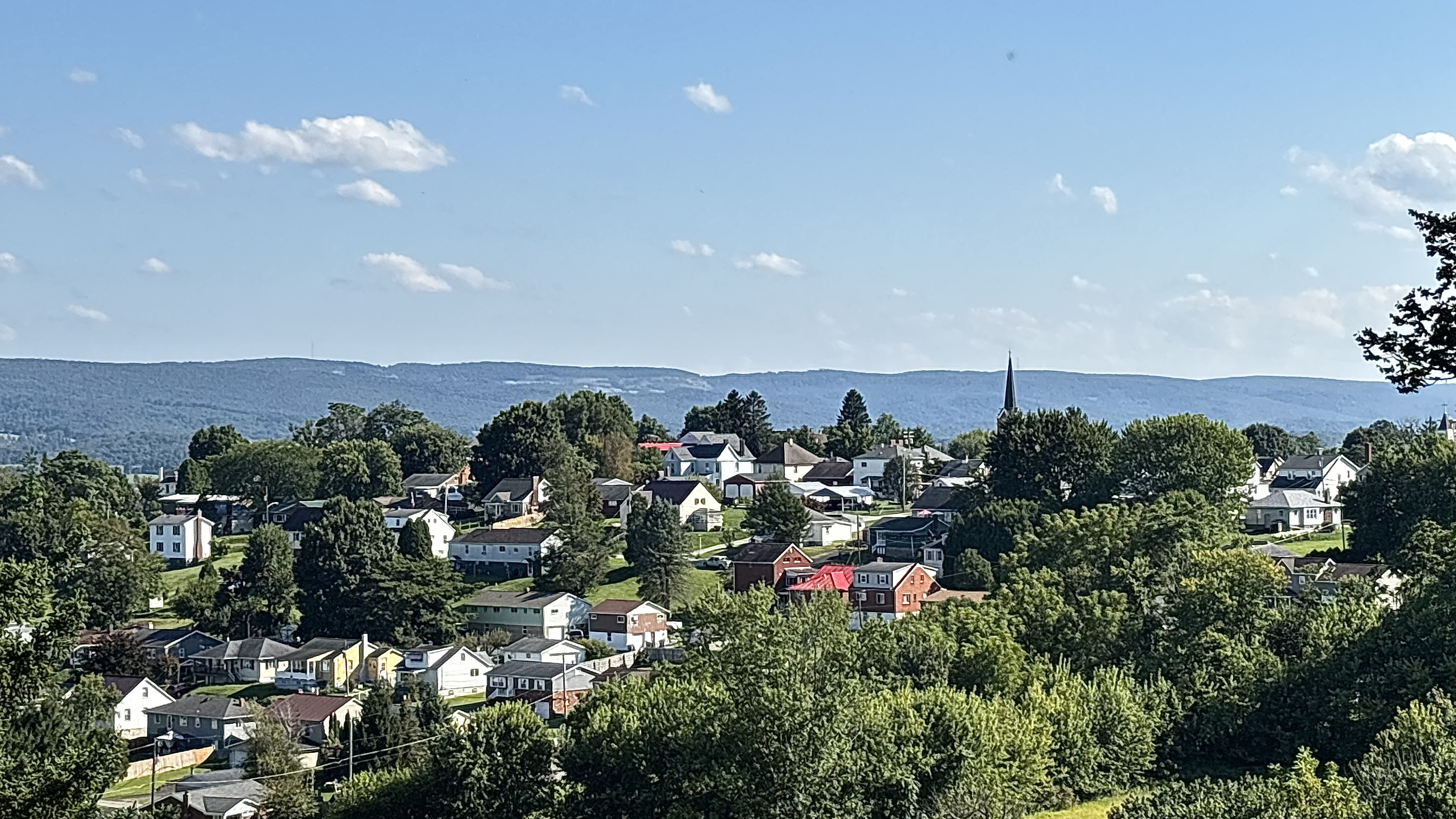
Neighborhood in rural Mount Pleasant as seen from the Mount Pleasant Cemetery in 2026

As of the 2020 census, Mount Pleasant had a population of 4,245. The median age was 46.1 years. 19.2% of residents were under the age of 18 and 24.6% of residents were 65 years of age or older. For every 100 females there were 90.0 males, and for every 100 females age 18 and over there were 85.1 males age 18 and over.

100.0% of residents lived in urban areas, while 0.0% lived in rural areas.

There were 1,980 households in Mount Pleasant, of which 22.1% had children under the age of 18 living in them. Of all households, 36.7% were married-couple households, 21.1% were households with a male householder and no spouse or partner present, and 34.6% were households with a female householder and no spouse or partner present. About 40.4% of all households were made up of individuals and 20.5% had someone living alone who was 65 years of age or older.

There were 2,194 housing units, of which 9.8% were vacant. The homeowner vacancy rate was 2.9% and the rental vacancy rate was 10.9%.

Racial composition as of the 2020 census
Race	Number	Percent
White	3,960	93.3%
Black or African American	69	1.6%
American Indian and Alaska Native	13	0.3%
Asian	9	0.2%
Native Hawaiian and Other Pacific Islander	0	0.0%
Some other race	18	0.4%
Two or more races	176	4.1%
Hispanic or Latino (of any race)	70	1.6%

=== 2000 census ===
As of the 2000 census, there were 4,728 people, 2,057 households, and 1,225 families residing in the borough. The population density was 4,127.5 inhabitants per square mile (1,593.6/km^{2}). There were 2,227 housing units at an average density of 1,944.1 per square mile (750.6/km^{2}). The racial makeup of the borough was 97.10% White, 1.67% African American, 0.15% Native American, 0.23% Asian, 0.15% from other races, and 0.70% from two or more races. Hispanic or Latino of any race were 0.32% of the population.

There were 2,057 households, out of which 22.9% had children under the age of 18 living with them, 45.7% were married couples living together, 10.6% had a female householder with no husband present, and 40.4% were non-families. 36.6% of all households were made up of individuals, and 20.4% had someone living alone who was 65 years of age or older. The average household size was 2.20 and the average family size was 2.88.

In the borough the population was spread out, with 19.1% under the age of 18, 6.3% from 18 to 24, 26.5% from 25 to 44, 22.9% from 45 to 64, and 25.2% who were 65 years of age or older. The median age was 44 years. For every 100 females, there were 83.5 males. For every 100 females age 18 and over, there were 80.2 males.

The median income for a household in the borough was $30,738, and the median income for a family was $41,438. Males had a median income of $30,655 versus $23,333 for females. The per capita income for the borough was $16,517. About 5.1% of families and 11.0% of the population were below the poverty line, including 14.9% of those under age 18 and 9.0% of those age 65 or over.

=== Ancestry ===
A large proportion of the residents are of Polish descent, as evidenced by the Tadeusz Kościuszko Club.

== Notable people ==
- Jennifer Daugherty (November 8, 1979 – February 11, 2010), mentally disabled woman who was tortured and killed as an act of revenge.
- Jack Gantos (born 1951), author of children's books
- John W. Geary (1819–1873), U.S. general during the Civil War and 16th Governor of Pennsylvania.
- Lillian Resler Keister Harford (1851–1935), church organizer and editor
- Raymond V. Kirk (1901–1947), president of Duquesne University
- Rich Rollins (1938-2025), Major League Baseball player
- Jess M. Stairs (born 1942), Republican Party member of the Pennsylvania House of Representatives
- Steve Swetonic (1903–1974), Major League Baseball pitcher
- Neal ElAttrache, orthepedic surgeon
