= Samuel Warden House =

Historic house in Pennsylvania, United States

- U.S. National Register of Historic Places
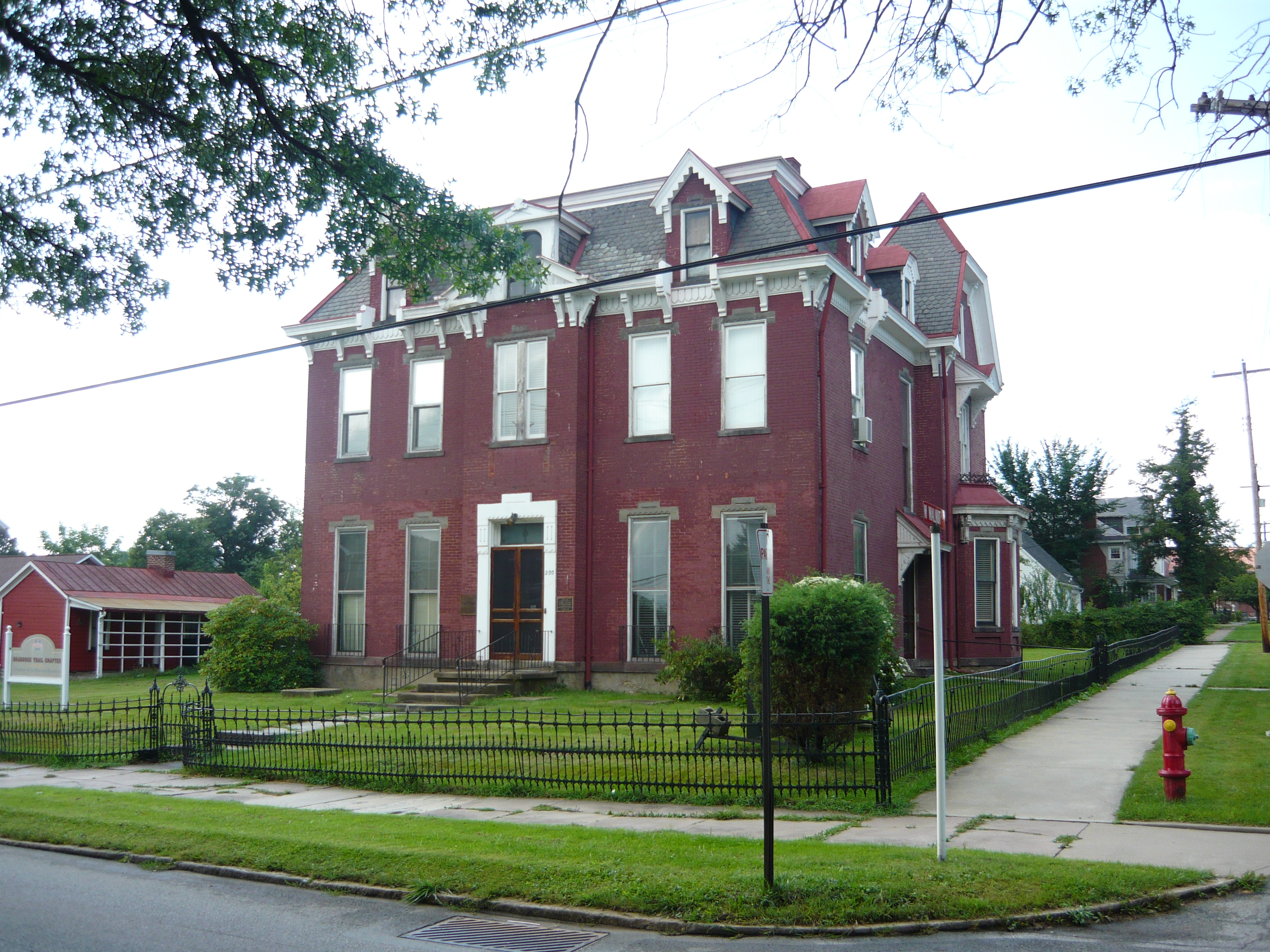
- Warden House, August 2009

- Location within Pennsylvania Location within the United States
- Location: 200 S. Church St., Mount Pleasant, Pennsylvania
- Coordinates: 40°8′52″N 79°32′50″W
- Area: 2.2 acres (0.89 ha)
- Built: 1886
- Architectural style: Second Empire
- NRHP reference No.: 95001252
- Added to NRHP: November 7, 1995

Samuel Warden House is a historic home located at Mount Pleasant, Westmoreland County, Pennsylvania. The house was built in 1886, and is a three-story, square brick dwelling in the Second Empire style, with Queen Anne and Eastlake style details. It has a mansard roof clad in octagonal, fishscale slate with dormer windows.

It was added to the National Register of Historic Places in 1995.
