= Mount Pleasant Armory =

- U.S. National Register of Historic Places
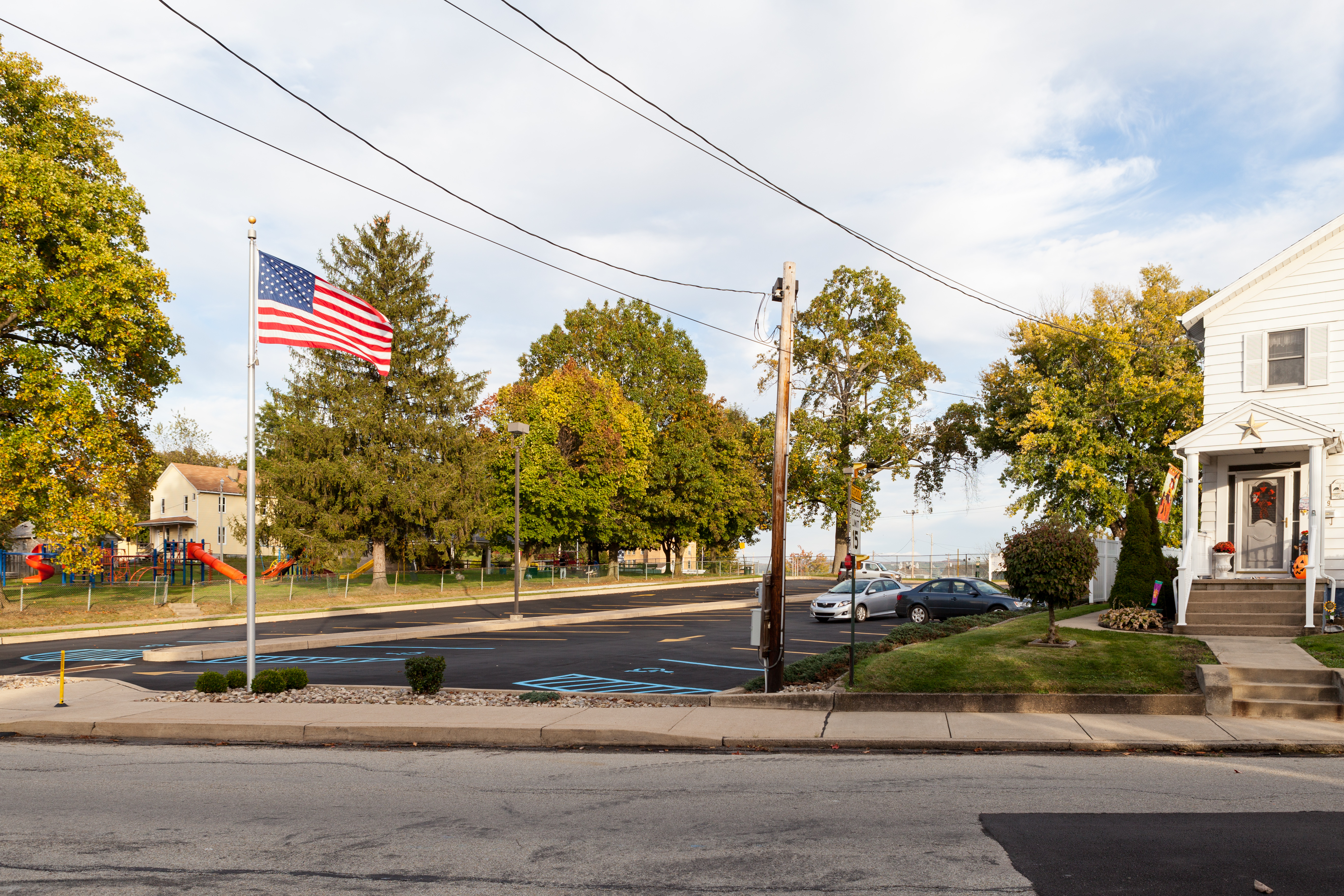
- Former location of the armory, October 2014

- Location within Pennsylvania Location within the United States
- Location: Eagle and Spring Sts., Mount Pleasant, Pennsylvania
- Coordinates: 40°8′26″N 78°57′43″W
- Area: 0.4 acres (0.16 ha)
- Built: 1906
- Architect: Wilkins, W.G. Co.; Hurst, Frank H.
- Architectural style: Romanesque
- Demolished: 1996
- MPS: Pennsylvania National Guard Armories MPS
- NRHP reference No.: 89002079
- Added to NRHP: December 22, 1989

The Mount Pleasant Armory was an historic National Guard armory in Mount Pleasant, Pennsylvania.

Added to the National Register of Historic Places in 1989, it was demolished in 1996.

== History and architectural features ==
Designed by W.G. Wilkins Co., this historic structure was built in 1906, and was a two-story, T-shaped brick building that was executed in the Romanesque style. It had a flat roof over the administrative section and a gambrel roof over the drill hall.
