= Joseph G. De Paul =

United States Army general

Joseph G. De Paul is a brigadier general in the Pennsylvania Army National Guard.

== Career ==
De Paul originally enlisted in the Pennsylvania Army National Guard in 1970. He was commissioned an officer in 1979. The following year, he was stationed briefly for training at Fort Eustis in Hampton, Virginia, and Newport News, Virginia before being stationed in Philadelphia, Pennsylvania.

In 1989, he served as a course instructor in Madison, Wisconsin, before being named a company commander with the 84th Division in Milwaukee, Wisconsin. He was later stationed in Annville Township, Lebanon County, Pennsylvania in 1993.

After serving as a battalion commander in Lancaster, Pennsylvania, De Paul became Deputy Chief of Staff for Operations of the Pennsylvania Army National Guard in 2000. He was assigned as Assistant Division Commander of the 28th Infantry Division in 2006.

Awards he has received include the Legion of Merit, the Meritorious Service Medal with one silver and one bronze oak leaf cluster, the Army Commendation Medal with three oak leaf clusters, the Army Achievement Medal, the Army Reserve Components Achievement Medal with one silver and one bronze oak leaf cluster, the National Defense Service Medal with two service stars, the Humanitarian Service Medal with service star, the Armed Forces Reserve Medal with gold hourglass device, the Army Service Ribbon, the Army Reserve Components Overseas Training Ribbon with award numeral "5" and the Meritorious Unit Commendation.

== Education ==
- University of the State of New York
- United States Army War College
