= Ruffs Dale, Pennsylvania =

Unincorporated community in Pennsylvania, US

Coordinates: 40°10′30″N 79°36′29″W

- Census-designated place
- Downtown Ruffs Dale
- Interactive map of Ruffs Dale, Pennsylvania
- Country: United States
- State: Pennsylvania
- County: Westmoreland
- Township: East Huntingdon Township

Area
  - Total: 0.60 sq mi (1.55 km^{2})
  - Land: 0.60 sq mi (1.55 km^{2})
  - Water: 0 sq mi (0.0 km^{2})

Population (2020)
  - Total: 321
  - Density: 536/sq mi (207/km^{2})
- Time zone: UTC-5 (Eastern (EST))
  - Summer (DST): UTC-4 (EDT)
- ZIP Code: 15679
- Area code: 724
- FIPS code: 42-67024

Ruffs Dale, also spelled Ruffsdale, is an unincorporated community in East Huntingdon Township, Westmoreland County, Pennsylvania United States. It is located approximately forty miles from Pittsburgh. Ruffs Dale has its own post office, with zip code 15679, located at 875 State Route 31.

== History ==
=== Early settlement ===
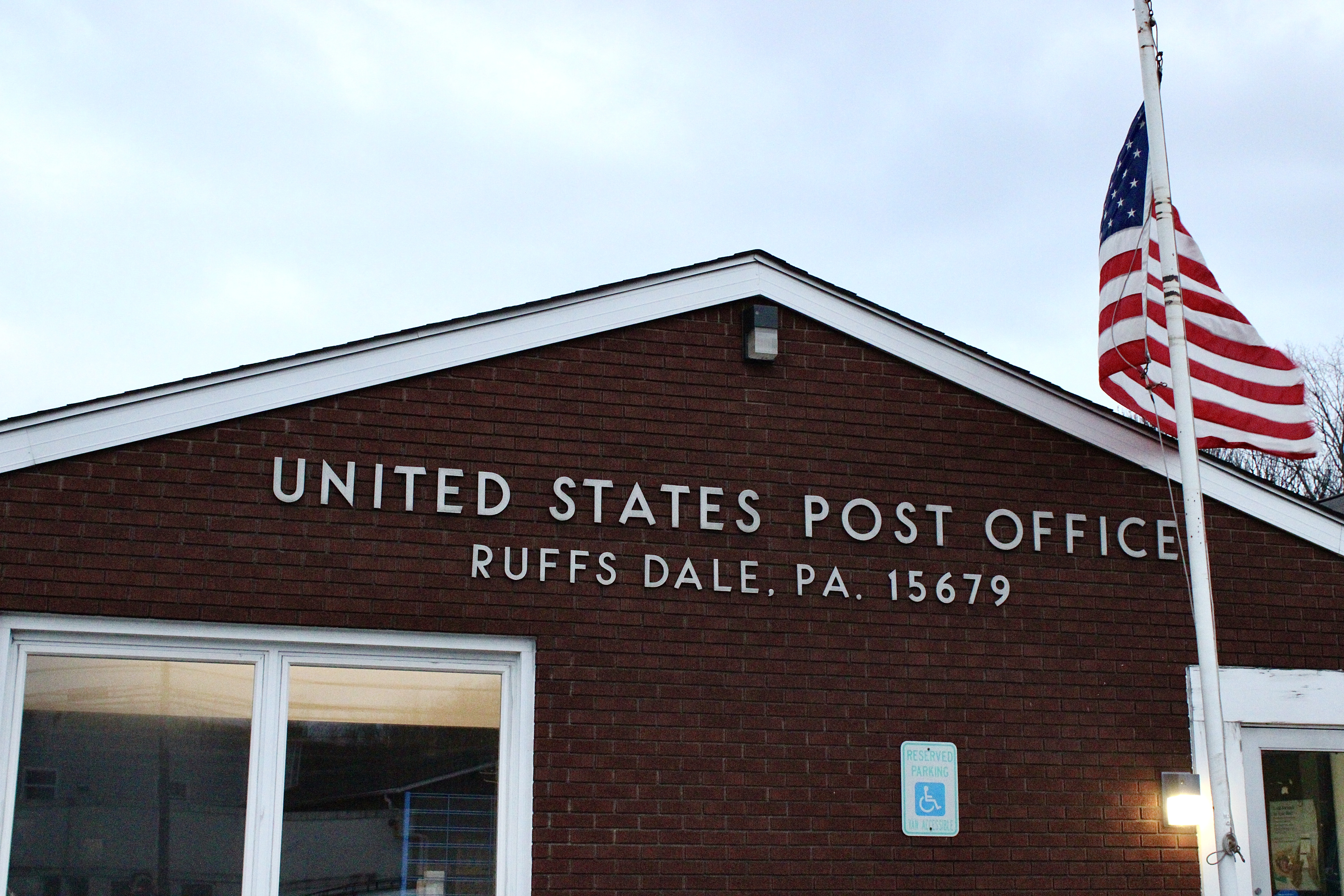
Post office in Ruffs Dale, Pennsylvania

The land surrounding Ruffs Dale was settled in the late 18th century as part of the westward expansion into western Pennsylvania following the American Revolutionary War. The region lies near the route taken by British General Edward Braddock during the Braddock Expedition of 1755 in the French and Indian War, which passed through nearby areas en route to Fort Duquesne.

The community’s name is generally believed to derive from the Ruff family, early settlers who established farms and homesteads in the area during the early 19th century.

=== Industrial development ===
By the mid-to-late 19th century, Ruffs Dale developed as a small industrial village. Its growth was closely tied to the expansion of coal mining in Westmoreland County and the arrival of the Pennsylvania Railroad, which provided transportation for both passengers and freight.

The Southwest Branch of the railroad connected Ruffs Dale with nearby industrial towns, contributing to the movement of coal and agricultural goods. Several coal mines operated in the surrounding hills, employing local residents and immigrants who had settled in the region.

=== Rural free delivery ===
Ruffs Dale holds historical significance as one of the earliest sites of Rural Free Delivery (RFD) service in the United States. In 1896, experimental rural mail routes were established in the area, marking a major shift in how mail was delivered to rural communities.

The success of these early routes helped lead to the nationwide adoption of RFD, significantly improving communication and commerce in rural America. A Pennsylvania historical marker commemorates this development in Ruffs Dale.

=== Distilling industry ===
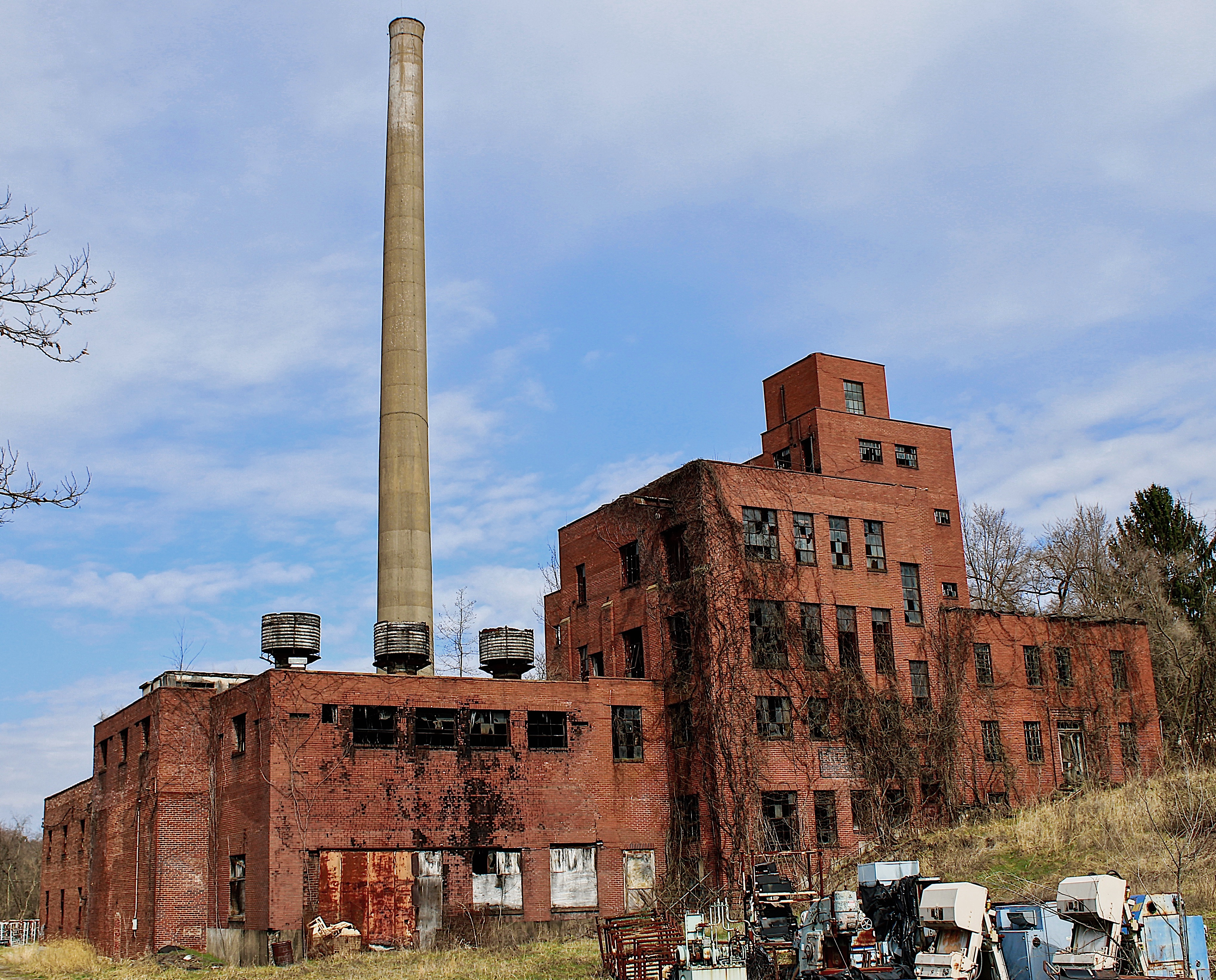
Former distillery in Ruffs Dale which sits abandoned as of March 2026

In 1882, the S. Dillinger & Sons distillery was established in Ruffs Dale. The distillery produced “Dillinger Pure Rye” whiskey and became one of the largest distilling operations in western Pennsylvania during its peak.

The distillery remained in operation into the mid-20th century before closing, reflecting broader declines in local industry. The site has since become a notable historical landmark within the community.

=== 20th century to present ===
Following the decline of coal mining and rail transportation in the mid-20th century, Ruffs Dale transitioned into a primarily residential community. Many residents began commuting to nearby towns and cities for employment, particularly Greensburg and the Pittsburgh metropolitan area.

Despite economic changes, the community has retained its rural character and remains closely tied to the history and identity of Westmoreland County.

== Geography ==
Ruffs Dale is located in central Westmoreland County in southwestern Pennsylvania. The community lies along Pennsylvania Route 31, which serves as its main transportation corridor and connects it to Mount Pleasant, West Newton, and Scottdale.

The area is characterized by rolling hills, wooded landscapes, and small streams.

Buffalo Run, a tributary of Sewickley Creek, runs through Ruffs Dale.

In 1906, historian John Newton Boucher described Ruffs Dale as being located along “the South-West Branch of the Pennsylvania Railroad” between Hunker and “Tarr”. (likely referring to Tarrs). Railroad infrastructure remained in place in the area into the 21st century.

== Demographics ==
As a census-designated place, Ruffs Dale had a population of 321 at the 2020 United States Census.

The broader ZIP Code area (15679) includes a larger population, reflecting the surrounding rural communities. The population is predominantly residential, with a mix of age groups and a median age typical of rural western Pennsylvania communities.

== Education ==
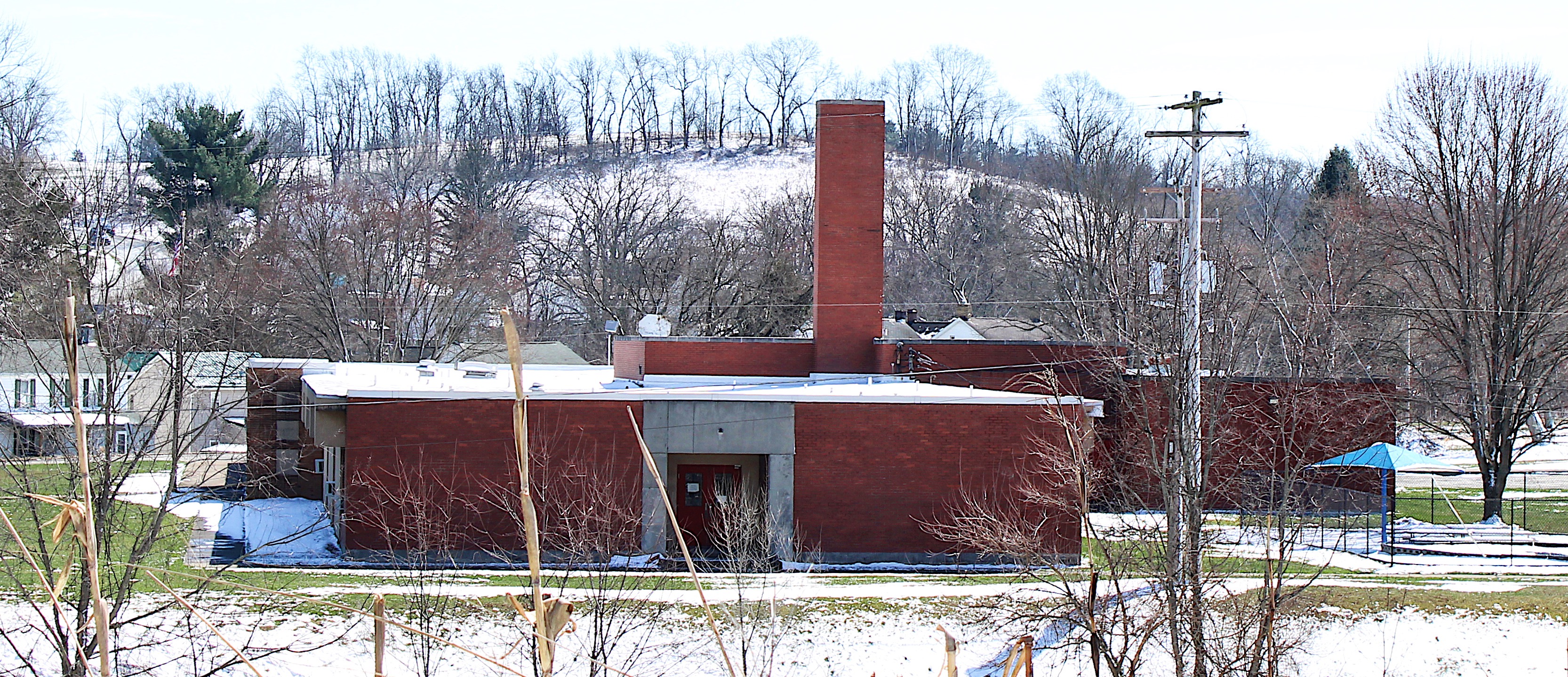
Former Ruffs Dale Elementary School building, formerly part of the Southmoreland School District

Ruffs Dale is primarily served by the Yough School District, with some areas falling within the Southmoreland School District. Public schools serving the area include Yough Senior High School and Southmoreland High School.

== Transportation ==
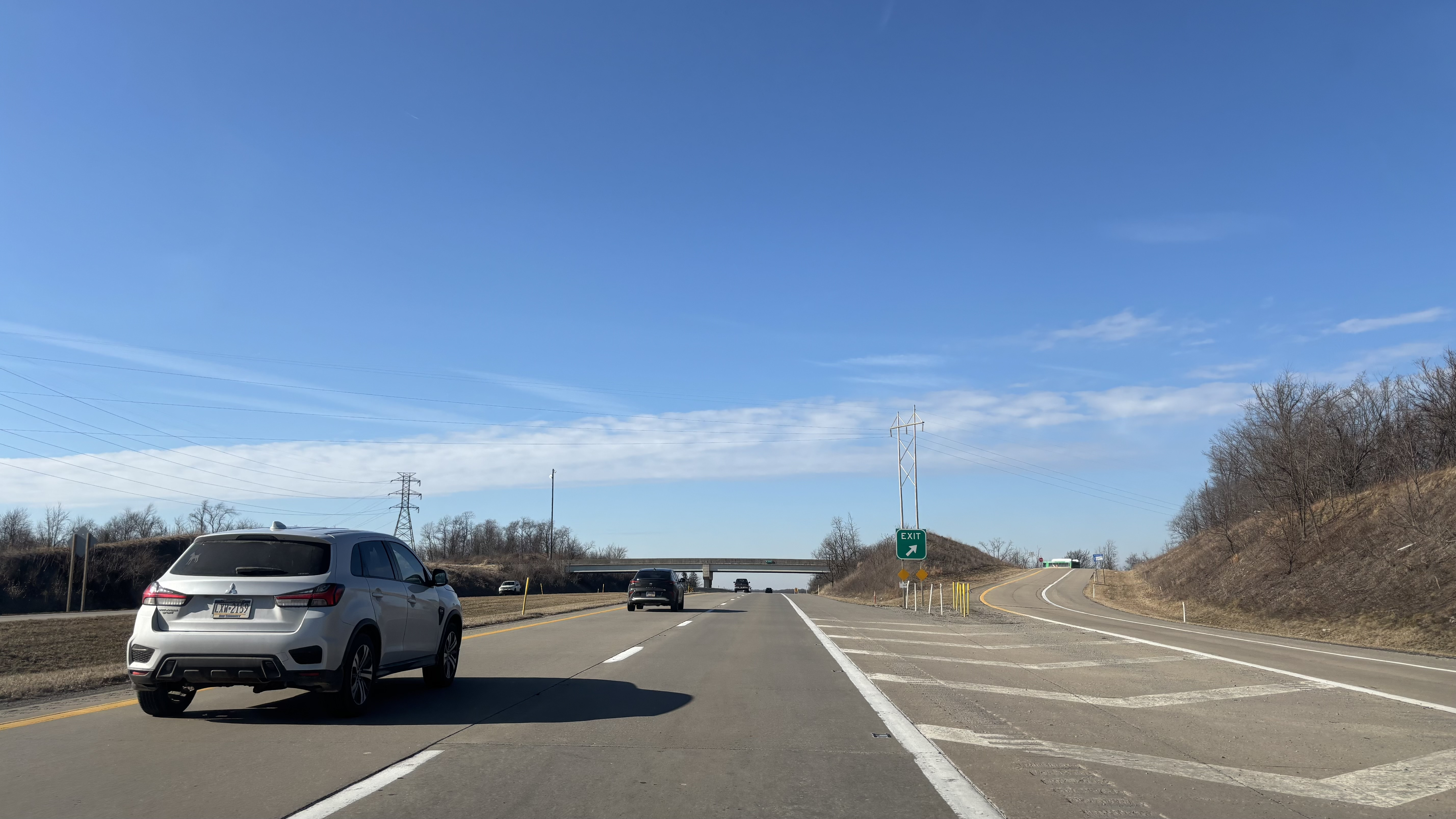
Exit to Ruffs Dale from Pennsylvania Route 119 north

Pennsylvania Route 31 is the primary roadway through Ruffs Dale. The community is also located within driving distance of Interstate 70 and the Pennsylvania Turnpike, providing regional access.

Historically, the Pennsylvania Railroad played a key role in transportation, though rail service in the immediate area has since declined.

== Eсonomy ==
Historically, Ruffs Dale's economy centered on coal mining, rail transportation, and distilling. As these industries declined, the local economy shifted toward residential and service based employment. Today, many residents commute to nearby economic centers such as Greensburg, Pennsylvania and Pittsburgh.

== Nearby communities ==
- Hunker: 3 miles
- New Stanton: 5 miles
- Mount Pleasant: 9 miles
- Scottdale: 7 miles
- West Newton: 8 miles
- Tarrs: 4 miles
- Yukon: 4 miles
