= Boyer Run (Sewickley Creek tributary) =

Stream in Pennsylvania, USA

Boyer Run Tributary to Sewickley Creek
- Location of Boyer Run mouth Boyer Run (Sewickley Creek tributary) (the United States)

Location
- Country: United States
- State: Pennsylvania
- County: Westmoreland

Physical characteristics
- Source: Brush Run divide
  - location: about 1 mile northeast of Standard Shaft, Pennsylvania
  - coordinates: 40°10′29″N 079°30′13″W
  - elevation: 1,152 ft (351 m)
- Mouth: Sewickley Creek
  - location: about 0.5 miles east of Armbrust, Pennsylvania
  - coordinates: 40°13′09″N 079°32′07″W
  - elevation: 958 ft (292 m)
- Length: 2.98 mi (4.80 km)
- Basin size: 8.44 square miles (21.9 km^{2})
- Discharge
  - location: Sewickley Creek
  - average: 7.86 cu ft/s (0.223 m^{3}/s) at mouth with Sewickley Creek

Basin features
- Progression: Sewickley Creek → Youghiogheny River → Monongahela River → Ohio River → Mississippi River → Gulf of Mexico
- River system: Monongahela River
- Tributaries
  - left: unnamed tributaries
  - right: Hurst Run
- Bridges: PA 981, Boyer Road, Armbrust-Hecla Road

Boyer Run is a 2.98 mi (4.80 km) long 2nd order tributary to Sewickley Creek in Westmoreland County, Pennsylvania.

== Course ==
Boyer Run rises about one mile (1.6 km) northeast of Standard Shaft, Pennsylvania, and then flows northwest to join Sewickley Creek at about 0.5 miles (0.80 km) east of Armbrust.

== Watershed ==
Boyer Run drains 5.44 square miles (14.1 km^{2}) of area, receives about 42.6 in (1,080 mm) per year of precipitation, has a wetness index of 382.48, and is about 44% forested.
