= Five Star Trail =

Coordinates: 40.309°N 79.532°W

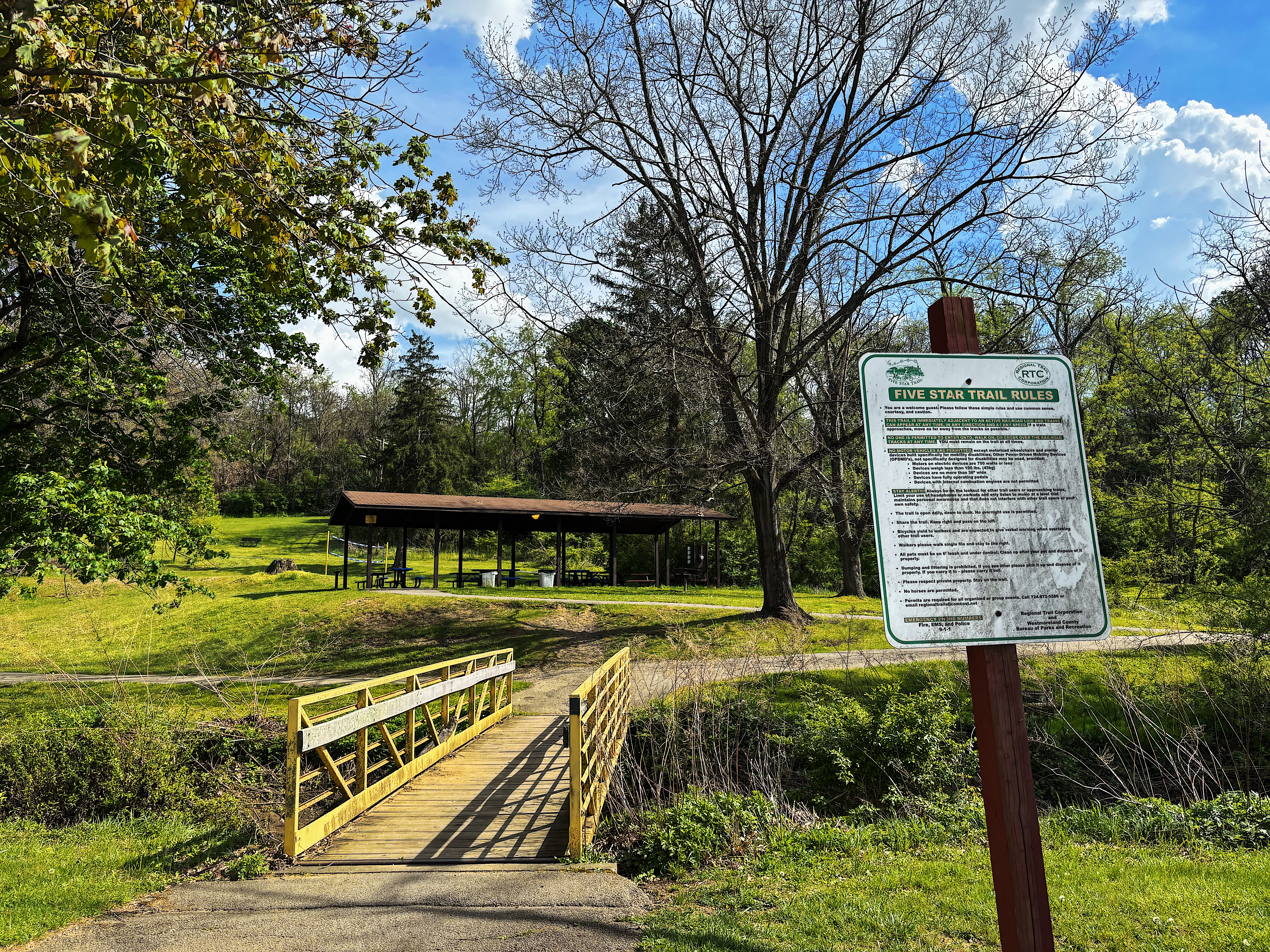
- Entrance to Five Star Trail at Lynch Field in Greensburg
- Length: 7.76 mi (12.49 km)
- Location: Westmoreland County, Pennsylvania
- Designation: Rail Trail
- Trailheads: Greensburg, Pennsylvania, Youngwood, Pennsylvania, Spur to Armbrust, Pennsylvania
- Use: Hiking, Biking, Jogging, Cross country skiing, Handicap access
- Difficulty: Easy
- Season: Year-Round
- Hazards: Severe Weather, Trains (adjacent to trail); Road Crossings
- Website: Five Star Trail
Trail map

The Five Star Trail runs nearly 8 miles through Westmoreland County, in the U.S. state of Pennsylvania. The trail is alongside an active railroad track, Southwestern Pennsylvania Railroad, that stretches between Lynch Field, a Greensburg city park and Youngwood. The trail then spurs off eastward to connect with the campus of Westmoreland County Community College and continues on to Armbrust.

== Background ==
In 1995, the trail corridor was purchased from Conrail by The Westmoreland County Industrial Development Corporation. The municipalities of Greensburg, South Greensburg, Southwest Greensburg, Youngwood, and Hempfield, along with The Westmoreland County Parks and Recreation Department are all partners in the trail project. The trail is named in honor of these five towns. The trail is kept clean by PA Cleanways. There are volunteers that help maintain the trail and there is a Poker Run held annually along the trail.

== Points of interest ==
Entrance to Five Star Trail in Hufftown (Southwest Greensburg, Pennsylvania)

The trail accommodates walking, hiking, jogging, bicycling, and cross country skiing. Other points of interest include:

- Park at Lynch Field
  - (Park with pool, playground, a few war relics - including a UH-1 "Huey" helicopter)
- Sports complex in Greensburg
- Youngwood Train Station (museum focused on local railroad history)
- Depot Street, (a 1.5-mile paved walkway with old rail cars, including a converted caboose)
- Youngwood Campus of Westmoreland County Community College

== Parking and trail access ==
The trailhead is located at the Westmoreland County Community College, on College Avenue across from the baseball field. The trail is accessible to the handicapped and is pet friendly. Additionally, there are multiple access points located off Route 119:

- Lynch Field (Greensburg)
- Huff Avenue (South Greensburg)
- Willow Crossing Road/Shady Lane (Hempfield)
- Trolley Line Avenue (Youngwood)
- Depot Street (Youngwood)

== See also ==
- Westmoreland County, Pennsylvania
- Greensburg, Pennsylvania
- Hempfield Township, Westmoreland County, Pennsylvania
- Youngwood, Pennsylvania
- Armbrust, Pennsylvania
