= Jacks Run (Sewickley Creek tributary) =

Stream in Pennsylvania, USA

Jacks Run Tributary to Sewickley Creek
- Location of Jacks Run mouth Jacks Run (Sewickley Creek tributary) (the United States)

Location
- Country: United States
- State: Pennsylvania
- County: Westmoreland
- City: Greensburg
- Borough: Youngwood

Physical characteristics
- Source: Crabtree Creek divide
  - location: about 0.5 miles southwest of Hannastown, Pennsylvania
  - coordinates: 40°20′07″N 079°30′06″W
  - elevation: 1,130 ft (340 m)
- Mouth: Sewickley Creek
  - location: Youngwood, Pennsylvania
  - coordinates: 40°13′45″N 079°46′39″W
  - elevation: 938 ft (286 m)
- Length: 9.44 mi (15.19 km)
- Basin size: 28.58 square miles (74.0 km^{2})
- Discharge
  - location: Sewickley Creek
  - average: 38.09 cu ft/s (1.079 m^{3}/s) at mouth with Sewickley Creek

Basin features
- Progression: Sewickley Creek → Youghiogheny River → Monongahela River → Ohio River → Mississippi River → Gulf of Mexico
- River system: Monongahela River
- Tributaries
  - left: Slate Creek
  - right: Coal Tar Run; Zellers Run
- Bridges: Barnhart Road, New Alexandria Road (x2), Roseytown Road, E Pittsburgh Street, Offutt Street, Laird Street, Brewery Lane, Euclid Avenue, Mt. Pleasant Street, Green Street, Southwest Crossroads, US 30, PA 819, US 119, Keystone Avenue, US 119, Shady Lane, Avenue B, Depot Street, E Hillis Street

Jacks Run is a 9.44-mile-long (15.19 km) third-order tributary to Sewickley Creek in Westmoreland County, Pennsylvania.

== Course ==
Jacks Run rises about 0.5 miles (0.80 km) southwest of Hannastown, Pennsylvania, and then flows southwest to join Sewickley Creek at Youngwood.

== Watershed ==
Jacks Run drains 28.58 square miles (74.0 km^{2}) of area, receives about 42.2 inches per year (107 cm/year) of precipitation, has a wetness index of 378.89, and is about 34% forested.
