= Sewickley Creek =

Stream in Pennsylvania, USA

Sewickley Creek Tributary to Youghiogheny River
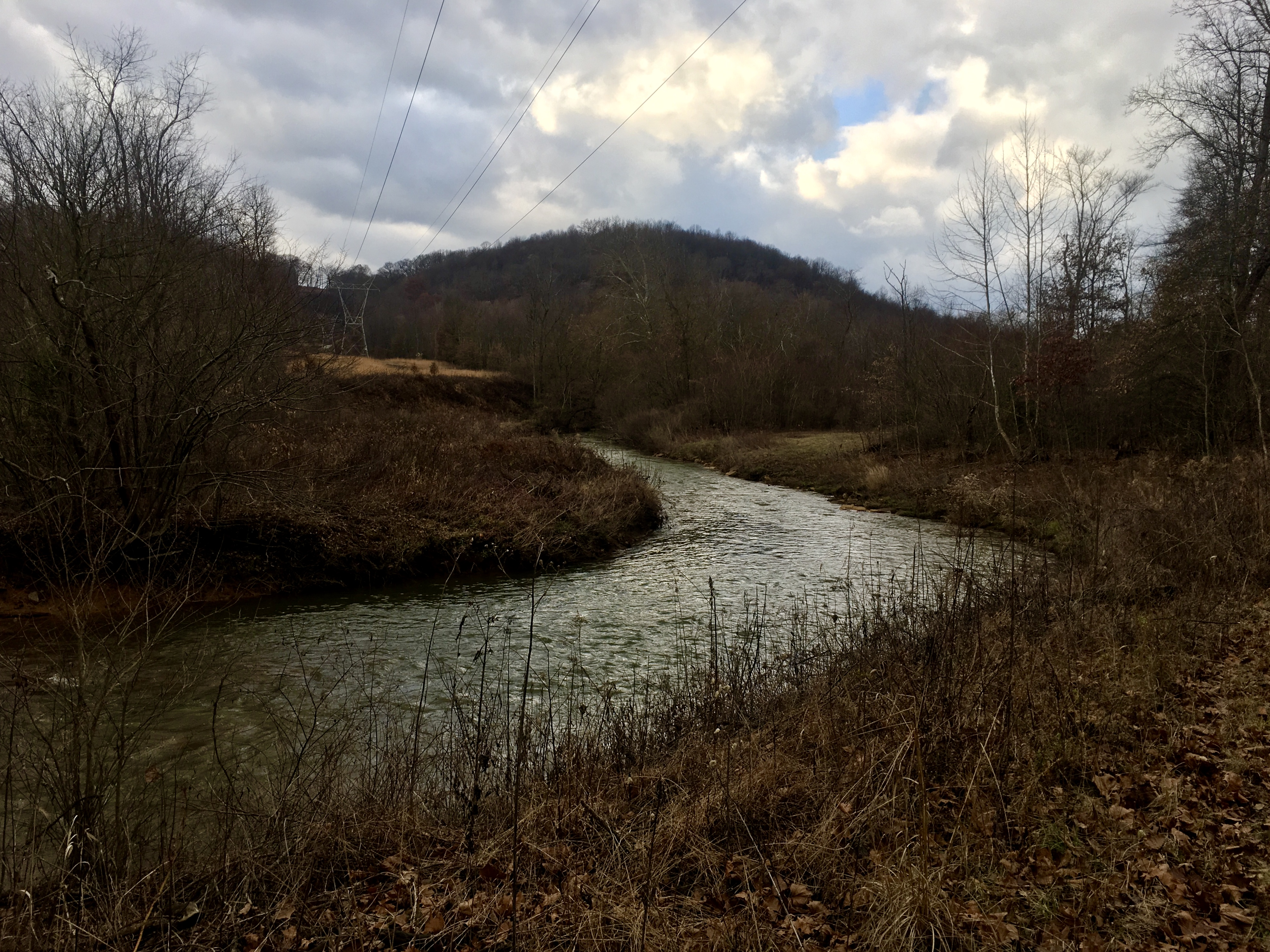
- A bend in Sewickley Creek as seen from the Five Star Trail, just southeast of the campus of Westmoreland Community College in Hempfield Township, PA, December 2018.

- Location of Sewickley Creek mouth Sewickley Creek (the United States)

Location
- Country: United States
- State: Pennsylvania
- County: Westmoreland
- Borough: Hunker; Youngwood; New Stanton

Physical characteristics
- Source: Fourmile Run divide
  - location: about 1 mile north-northeast of Pleasant Unity, Pennsylvania
  - coordinates: 40°15′57″N 079°26′07″W
  - elevation: 1,145 ft (349 m)
- Mouth: Youghiogheny River
  - location: Collinsburg, Pennsylvania
  - coordinates: 40°13′45″N 079°46′39″W
  - elevation: 740 ft (230 m)
- Length: 29.53 mi (47.52 km)
- Basin size: 167.49 square miles (433.8 km^{2})
- Discharge
  - location: Youghiogheny River
  - average: 205.64 cu ft/s (5.823 m^{3}/s) at mouth with Youghiogheny River

Basin features
- Progression: Youghiogheny River → Monongahela River → Ohio River → Mississippi River → Gulf of Mexico
- River system: Monongahela River
- Tributaries
  - left: Welty Run; Boyer Run; Wilson Run; Belson Run; Buffalo Run; Lick Run; Hunters Run
  - right: North Branch Sewickley Creek; Brinker Run; Township Line Run; Jacks Run; Pinkerton Run; Kelly Run; Little Sewickley Creek
- Bridges: Schmuckers Road, PA 981, Kemerer Road, Phillips Road, PA 130, Bingham Road, Dutch Hill Road, Pollins Road, Fairground Road, United Road, Mt. Pleasant Road, Brinkerton Ext., Udell Road, Mt. Pleasant Road, Trouttown Road, Stone Church Road, US 119, I-76, S Center Avenue, Chaney Brothers Road, New Stanton-Ruffsdale Road, Hunker Waltz Mill Road, Waltz Mill Road, I-70, Yukon Road, Creek Road, Bells Mills Road, PA 136, Apples Mill Road, Sutersville Road

Sewickley Creek is a 29.53-mile-long (47.52 km) fourth-order tributary to the Youghiogheny River in Westmoreland County, Pennsylvania. This is the only stream of this name in the United States.

== Variant names ==
According to the Geographic Names Information System, it has also been known historically as Sewickey Creek.

== Course ==
Sewickley Creek rises in a pond about 1 mile (1.6 km) north of Pleasant Unity, Pennsylvania, and then flows westerly to join the Youghiogheny River across from Collinsburg.

== Watershed ==
Sewickley Creek drains 167.49 square miles (433.8 km^{2}) of area, receives about 43.3 inches per year (110 cm/year) of precipitation, has a wetness index of 370.17, and is about 45% forested. Non-EPA-compliant drainage of oil and gas drilling waste from the nearby Max Environmental landfill has polluted the creek in the 2020s, with elevated radiation levels downstream of the landfill drainage outlet.

== See also ==
- List of rivers of Pennsylvania
