= Belson Run =

Stream in Pennsylvania, USA

Belson Run Tributary to Sewickley Creek
- Location of Belson Run mouth Belson Run (the United States)

Location
- Country: United States
- State: Pennsylvania
- County: Westmoreland
- Borough: Hunker

Physical characteristics
- Source: Wilson Run divide
  - location: about 0.5 miles north of Central, Pennsylvania
  - coordinates: 40°11′18″N 079°34′47″W
  - elevation: 1,155 ft (352 m)
- Mouth: Sewickley Creek
  - location: Hunker, Pennsylvania
  - coordinates: 40°12′21″N 079°37′23″W
  - elevation: 920 ft (280 m)
- Length: 2.55 mi (4.10 km)
- Basin size: 2.70 square miles (7.0 km^{2})
- Discharge
  - location: Sewickley Creek
  - average: 3.71 cu ft/s (0.105 m^{3}/s) at mouth with Sewickley Creek

Basin features
- Progression: Sewickley Creek → Youghiogheny River → Monongahela River → Ohio River → Mississippi River → Gulf of Mexico
- River system: Monongahela River
- Tributaries
  - left: unnamed tributaries
  - right: unnamed tributaries
- Bridges: Tech Center Drive, Sunny Lane, Preacher's Road, Paintersville Road, New Stanton-Ruffsdale Road

Belson Run is a 2.55 mi (4.10 km) long 1st order tributary to Sewickley Creek in Westmoreland County, Pennsylvania. This is the only stream of this name in the United States.

== Course ==
Belson Run rises about 0.5 miles north of Central, Pennsylvania, and then flows northwest to join Sewickley Creek at Hunker.

== Watershed ==
Belson Run drains 2.70 square miles (7.0 km^{2}) of area, receives about 41.4 in/year of precipitation, has a wetness index of 416.98, and is about 37% forested.
