= Kelly Run (Sewickley Creek tributary) =

Stream in Pennsylvania, USA

Kelly Run Tributary to Sewickley Creek
- Location of Kelly Run mouth Kelly Run (Sewickley Creek tributary) (the United States)

Location
- Country: United States
- State: Pennsylvania
- County: Westmoreland

Physical characteristics
- Source: Little Sewickley Creek divide
  - location: about 0.5 miles south of Herminie, Pennsylvania
  - coordinates: 40°14′59″N 079°42′30″W
  - elevation: 1,175 ft (358 m)
- Mouth: Sewickley Creek
  - location: Hutchinson, Pennsylvania
  - coordinates: 40°13′30″N 079°44′42″W
  - elevation: 798 ft (243 m)
- Length: 2.83 mi (4.55 km)
- Basin size: 1.88 square miles (4.9 km^{2})
- Discharge
  - location: Sewickley Creek
  - average: 2.26 cu ft/s (0.064 m^{3}/s) at mouth with Sewickley Creek

Basin features
- Progression: Sewickley Creek → Youghiogheny River → Monongahela River → Ohio River → Mississippi River → Gulf of Mexico
- River system: Monongahela River
- Tributaries
  - left: unnamed tributaries
  - right: unnamed tributaries
- Bridges: Balentine Road, Herminie-West Newton Road, Apples Mill Road

Kelly Run is a 2.83 mi (4.55 km) long 1st order tributary to Sewickley Creek in Westmoreland County, Pennsylvania.

== Course ==
Kelly Run rises about 0.5 miles south of Herminie, Pennsylvania, and then flows southwest to join Sewickley Creek at Hutchinson.

== Watershed ==
Kelly Run drains 1.88 square miles (4.9 km^{2}) of area, receives about an average of 1,016.30 millimetres (40.012 in) of precipitation each year, has a wetness index of 373.55, and is about 26% forested.

== See also ==
- List of rivers of Pennsylvania
