= Pinkerton Run =

Stream in Pennsylvania, USA

Pinkerton Run Tributary to Sewickley Creek
- Location of Pinkerton Run mouth Pinkerton Run (the United States)

Location
- Country: United States
- State: Pennsylvania
- County: Westmoreland

Physical characteristics
- Source: Little Sewickley Creek divide
  - location: about 0.5 miles west of Madison, Pennsylvania
  - coordinates: 40°14′59″N 079°42′51″W
  - elevation: 1,070 ft (330 m)
- Mouth: Sewickley Creek
  - location: about 0.5 miles west of Yukon, Pennsylvania
  - coordinates: 40°13′18″N 079°42′07″W
  - elevation: 880 ft (270 m)
- Length: 2.18 mi (3.51 km)
- Basin size: 1.71 square miles (4.4 km^{2})
- Discharge
  - location: Sewickley Creek
  - average: 2.13 cu ft/s (0.060 m^{3}/s) at mouth with Sewickley Creek

Basin features
- Progression: Sewickley Creek → Youghiogheny River → Monongahela River → Ohio River → Mississippi River → Gulf of Mexico
- River system: Monongahela River
- Tributaries
  - left: unnamed tributaries
  - right: unnamed tributaries
- Bridges: Morris Road, PA 136, Lake View Lane, Pierce Road, Creek Road

Pinkerton Run is a 2.18 mi (3.51 km) long 1st order tributary to Sewickley Creek in Westmoreland County, Pennsylvania.

== Course ==
Pinkerton Run rises about 0.5 miles west of Madison, Pennsylvania, and then flows south to join Sewickley Creek about 0.5 miles west of Yukon, Pennsylvania.

== Watershed ==
Pinkerton Run drains 1.71 square miles (4.4 km^{2}) of area, receives about 40.2 in/year of precipitation, has a wetness index of 342.05, and is about 34% forested.
