= Hunters Run (Sewickley Creek tributary) =

Stream in Pennsylvania, USA

Hunters Run Tributary to Sewickley Creek
- Location of Hunters Run mouth Hunters Run (Sewickley Creek tributary) (the United States)

Location
- Country: United States
- State: Pennsylvania
- County: Westmoreland

Physical characteristics
- Source: Painters Run and Dutch Hollow divide
  - location: about 0.5 miles southwest of Wyano, Pennsylvania
  - coordinates: 40°11′23″N 079°41′54″W
  - elevation: 1,005 ft (306 m)
- Mouth: Sewickley Creek
  - location: about 0.5 miles northwest of Wyano, Pennsylvania
  - coordinates: 40°12′33″N 079°42′57″W
  - elevation: 860 ft (260 m)
- Length: 2.69 mi (4.33 km)
- Basin size: 3.17 square miles (8.2 km^{2})
- Discharge
  - location: Sewickley Creek
  - average: 3.92 cu ft/s (0.111 m^{3}/s) at mouth with Sewickley Creek

Basin features
- Progression: Sewickley Creek → Youghiogheny River → Monongahela River → Ohio River → Mississippi River → Gulf of Mexico
- River system: Monongahela River
- Tributaries
  - left: Painters Run
  - right: unnamed tributaries
- Bridges: Smithton Pike, I-70, PA 31, I-70, 1st Street, Strikertown Road, Squires Lane, Turkeytown Road

Hunters Run is a 2.69 mi (4.33 km) long 2nd order tributary to Sewickley Creek in Westmoreland County, Pennsylvania.

== Course ==
Hunters Run rises about 0.5 miles southwest of Wyano, Pennsylvania, and then flows northerly to join Sewickley Creek about 0.5 miles northwest of Wyano.

== Watershed ==
Hunters Run drains 3.17 square miles (8.2 km^{2}) of area, receives about 40.3 in/year of precipitation, has a wetness index of 355.34, and is about 40% forested.
