= South Huntingdon Township, Pennsylvania =

Township in Pennsylvania, US

Coordinates: 40°07′00″N 79°41′59″W

South Huntingdon Township, Westmoreland County, Pennsylvania
- Township
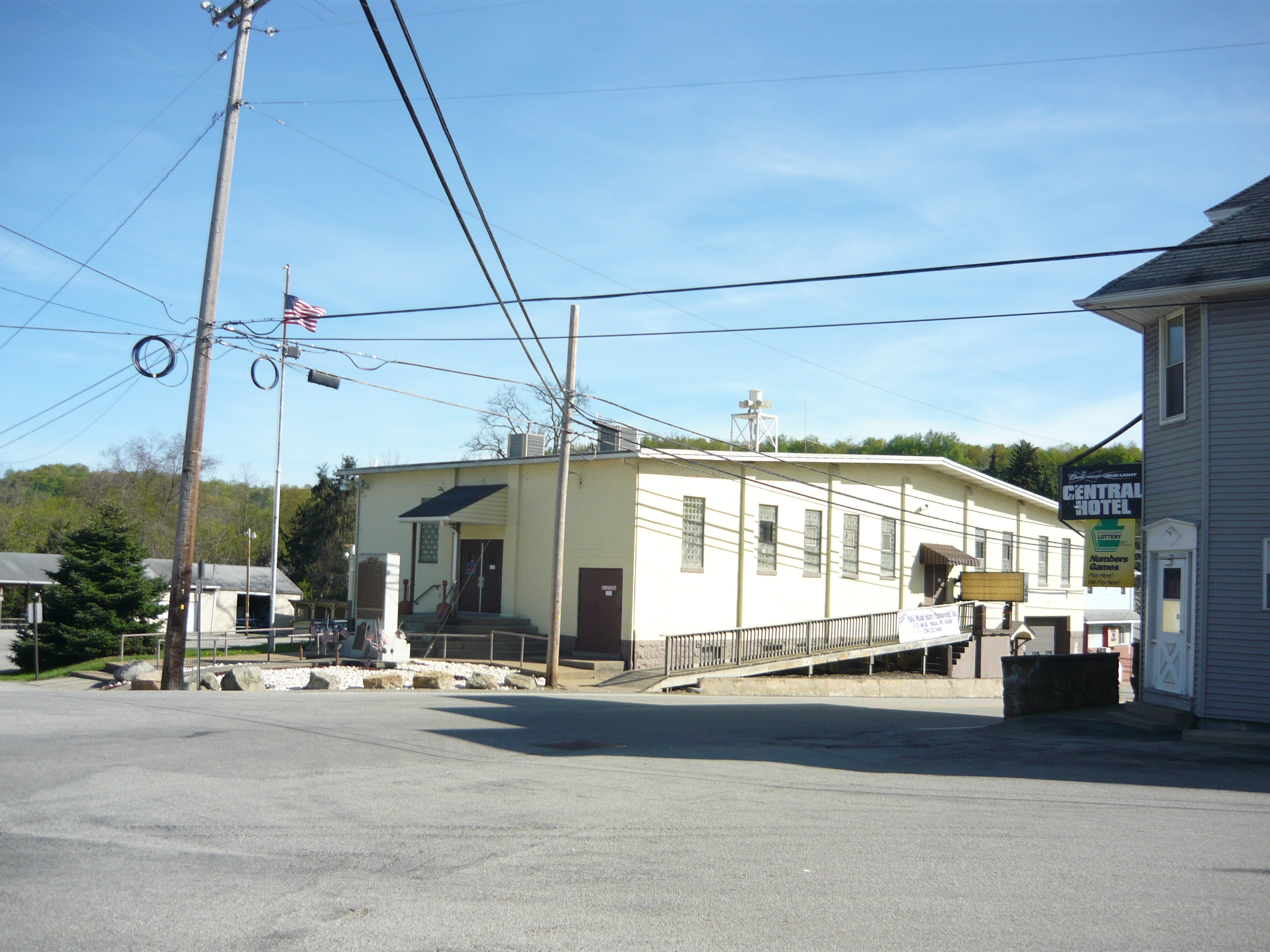
- Street scene in Yukon

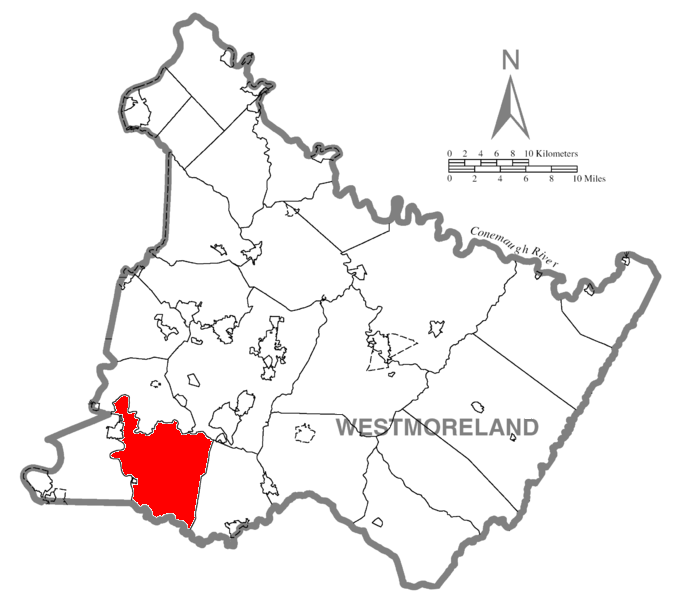
- Map of Westmoreland County, Pennsylvania Highlighting South Huntingdon Township

- Map of Pennsylvania highlighting Westmoreland County
- Country: United States
- State: Pennsylvania
- County: Westmoreland
- Settled: 1752
- Incorporated: 1790

Area
  - Total: 45.81 sq mi (118.65 km^{2})
  - Land: 45.42 sq mi (117.65 km^{2})
  - Water: 0.39 sq mi (1.00 km^{2})

Population (2020)
  - Total: 5,412 ▼
  - Estimate (2021): 5,374
  - Density: 122.5/sq mi (47.29/km^{2})
- Time zone: UTC-5 (Eastern (EST))
  - Summer (DST): UTC-4 (EDT)
- FIPS code: 42-129-72256
- Website: https://southhuntingdontownship.org/

South Huntingdon Township is a township in Westmoreland County, Pennsylvania, United States. The population was 5,412 at the 2020 census.

== History ==
Bituminous coal was plentiful in the area around South Huntington. The Youghiogheny and Ohio Coal Company's Osborne mines (in operation as early as 1915) and the Pittsburgh Coal Company's Eureka mine were in South Huntington Township. The Bells Mills Covered Bridge was listed on the National Register of Historic Places in 1980.

== Geography ==
According to the United States Census Bureau, the township has a total area of 45.7 square miles (118 km^{2}), of which 45.3 square miles (117 km^{2}) is land and 0.4 square miles (1.0 km^{2}) (0.98%) is water. It contains the census-designated places of Wyano and Yukon. The Sewickley Creek watershed is within the township.

== Demographics ==
Historical population
Census	Pop.	Note	%±
2000	6,175		—
2010	5,796		−6.1%
2020	5,412		−6.6%
2021 (est.)	5,374		−0.7%
U.S. Decennial Census

As of the census of 2000, there were 6,175 people, 2,461 households, and 1,840 families living in the township. The population density was 136.4 inhabitants per square mile (52.7/km^{2}). There were 2,585 housing units at an average density of 57.1 units per square mile (22.0 units/km^{2}). The racial makeup of the township was 98.02% White, 0.91% African American, 0.11% Native American, 0.08% Asian, 0.02% Pacific Islander, 0.06% from other races, and 0.79% from two or more races. Hispanic or Latino of any race were 0.37% of the population.

There were 2,461 households, out of which 28.9% had children under the age of 18 living with them, 61.4% were married couples living together, 9.3% had a female householder with no husband present, and 25.2% were non-families. 21.9% of all households were made up of individuals, and 11.6% had someone living alone who was 65 years of age or older. The average household size was 2.51 and the average family size was 2.91.

In the township the population was spread out, with 21.4% under the age of 18, 6.8% from 18 to 24, 29.1% from 25 to 44, 25.9% from 45 to 64, and 16.8% who were 65 years of age or older. The median age was 41 years. For every 100 females there were 96.9 males. For every 100 females age 18 and over, there were 96.1 males.

The median income for a household in the township was $35,431, and the median income for a family was $39,529. Males had a median income of $31,728 versus $23,033 for females. The per capita income for the township was $17,645. About 4.7% of families and 7.1% of the population were below the poverty line, including 5.8% of those under age 18 and 9.4% of those age 65 or over.

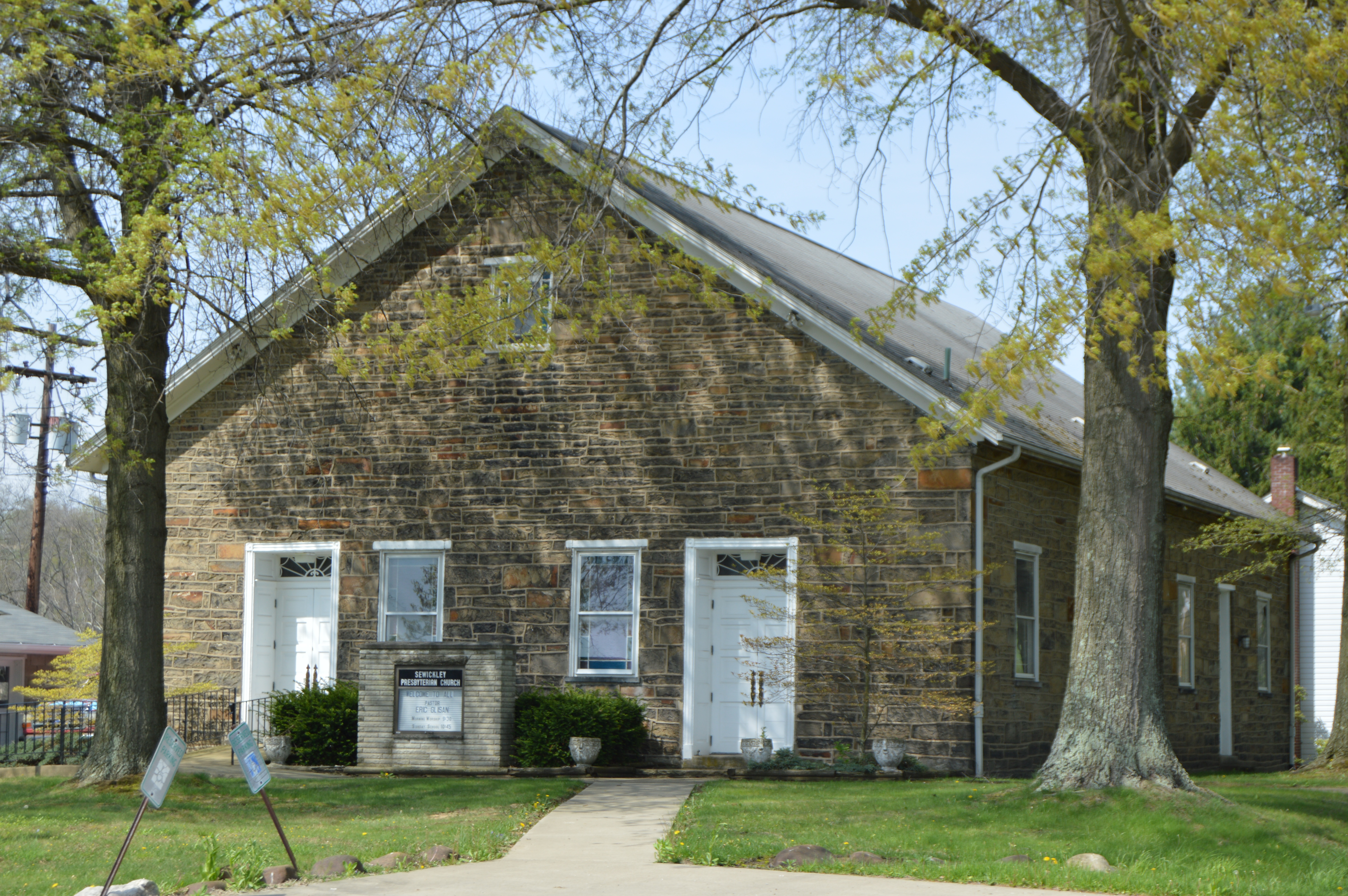
Sewickley Presbyterian Church on Bells Mills Road

== Development ==
Tenaska Westmoreland Generation Station, a 940-megawatt power plant, is located in South Huntington.

In October 2026 developers proposed to build a $25 million data center about a mile from the Tenaska power plant. Necessary approvals are pending.
