= Township Line Run =

Stream in Pennsylvania, USA

Township Line Run Tributary to Sewickley Creek
- Location of Township Line Run mouth Township Line Run (the United States)

Location
- Country: United States
- State: Pennsylvania
- County: Westmoreland

Physical characteristics
- Source: Slate Creek divide
  - location: Denison, Pennsylvania
  - coordinates: 40°16′41″N 079°30′04″W
  - elevation: 1,345 ft (410 m)
- Mouth: Sewickley Creek
  - location: Armbrust, Pennsylvania
  - coordinates: 40°13′23″N 079°32′54″W
  - elevation: 950 ft (290 m)
- Length: 5.82 mi (9.37 km)
- Basin size: 6.49 square miles (16.8 km^{2})
- Discharge
  - location: Sewickley Creek
  - average: 9.29 cu ft/s (0.263 m^{3}/s) at mouth with Sewickley Creek

Basin features
- Progression: Sewickley Creek → Youghiogheny River → Monongahela River → Ohio River → Mississippi River → Gulf of Mexico
- River system: Monongahela River
- Tributaries
  - left: unnamed tributaries
  - right: unnamed tributaries
- Waterbodies: Unity Reservoir
- Bridges: Chaucer Drive, Toppers Road, Kings Nursery Road, Lakewood Road (x2), PA 130, Pacek Road, Bailey Farm Road, Bennetts Road, Mt. Pleasant Road, Brinkerton Road, Birdie Lane, Pores Road, Harhai Road, Armbrust Brinkerton Road

Township Line Run is a 5.82 mi (9.37 km) long 2nd order tributary to Sewickley Creek in Westmoreland County, Pennsylvania. Township Line Run straddles to boundary between Unity and Hempfield Township and of Mount Pleasant and Hempfield Township. This is the only stream of this name in the United States.

== Course ==
Township Line Run rises in Denison, Pennsylvania, and then flows southwest to join Sewickley Creek at Armbrust.

== Watershed ==
Township Line Run drains 6.49 square miles (16.8 km^{2}) of area, receives about 42.7 in/year of precipitation, has a wetness index of 371.26, and is about 48% forested.
