= Brinker Run (Sewickley Creek tributary) =

Stream in Pennsylvania, USA

Brinker Run Tributary to Sewickley Creek
- Location of Brinker Run mouth Brinker Run (Sewickley Creek tributary) (the United States)

Location
- Country: United States
- State: Pennsylvania
- County: Westmoreland

Physical characteristics
- Source: North Branch Sewickley Creek divide
  - location: about 0.25 miles northwest of Humphreys, Pennsylvania
  - coordinates: 40°15′44″N 079°28′54″W
  - elevation: 1,170 ft (360 m)
- Mouth: Sewickley Creek
  - location: United, Pennsylvania
  - coordinates: 40°13′06″N 079°30′38″W
  - elevation: 965 ft (294 m)
- Length: 3.41 mi (5.49 km)
- Basin size: 3.49 square miles (9.0 km^{2})
- Discharge
  - location: Sewickley Creek
  - average: 5.10 cu ft/s (0.144 m^{3}/s) at mouth with Sewickley Creek

Basin features
- Progression: Sewickley Creek → Youghiogheny River → Monongahela River → Ohio River → Mississippi River → Gulf of Mexico
- River system: Monongahela River
- Tributaries
  - left: unnamed tributaries
  - right: unnamed tributaries
- Bridges: Myers Road, Ludwig Road, Firestone Road, Pinto Lane, Mount Pleasant Road, Sportsman Road, Brinkerton Road

Brinker Run is a 3.41 mi (5.49 km) long 2nd order tributary to Sewickley Creek in Westmoreland County, Pennsylvania.

== Course ==
Brinker Run rises about 0.25 miles northwest of Humphreys, Pennsylvania, and then flows southwest to join Sewickley Creek at United.

== Watershed ==
Brinker Run drains 3.49 square miles (9.0 km^{2}) of area, receives about 42.9 in/year of precipitation, has a wetness index of 367.95, and is about 43% forested.
