= Lick Run (Sewickley Creek tributary) =

Stream in Pennsylvania, USA

Lick Run Tributary to Sewickley Creek
- Location of Lick Run mouth Lick Run (Sewickley Creek tributary) (the United States)

Location
- Country: United States
- State: Pennsylvania
- County: Westmoreland

Physical characteristics
- Source: unnamed tributary to Sewickley Creek divide
  - location: Mendon, Pennsylvania
  - coordinates: 40°10′49″N 079°40′26″W
  - elevation: 1,090 ft (330 m)
- Mouth: Sewickley Creek
  - location: Yukon, Pennsylvania
  - coordinates: 40°12′29″N 079°40′21″W
  - elevation: 905 ft (276 m)
- Length: 2.68 mi (4.31 km)
- Basin size: 1.66 square miles (4.3 km^{2})
- Discharge
  - location: Sewickley Creek
  - average: 2.14 cu ft/s (0.061 m^{3}/s) at mouth with Sewickley Creek

Basin features
- Progression: Sewickley Creek → Youghiogheny River → Monongahela River → Ohio River → Mississippi River → Gulf of Mexico
- River system: Monongahela River
- Tributaries
  - left: unnamed tributaries
  - right: unnamed tributaries
- Bridges: I-70 (x2), Waltz Mill Road

Lick Run is a 2.68 mi (4.31 km) long 1st order tributary to Sewickley Creek in Westmoreland County, Pennsylvania.

== Variant names ==
According to the Geographic Names Information System, it has also been known historically as:

- Hull Run

== Course ==
Lick Run rise at Mendon, Pennsylvania, and then flows north to join Sewickley Creek at Yukon.

== Watershed ==
Lick Run drains 1.66 square miles (4.3 km^{2}) of area, receives about 40.5 in/year of precipitation, has a wetness index of 342.83, and is about 70% forested.
