= Welty Run =

Stream in Pennsylvania, USA

Welty Run Tributary to Sewickley Creek
- Location of Welty Run mouth Welty Run (the United States)

Location
- Country: United States
- State: Pennsylvania
- County: Westmoreland

Physical characteristics
- Source: Fourmile Run divide
  - location: about 3 miles southeast of Weltytown, Pennsylvania
  - coordinates: 40°11′15″N 079°24′06″W
  - elevation: 2,015 ft (614 m)
- Mouth: Sewickley Creek
  - location: Norvelt, Pennsylvania
  - coordinates: 40°12′45″N 079°29′35″W
  - elevation: 975 ft (297 m)
- Length: 6.59 mi (10.61 km)
- Basin size: 12.66 square miles (32.8 km^{2})
- Discharge
  - location: Sewickley Creek
  - average: 20.12 cu ft/s (0.570 m^{3}/s) at mouth with Sewickley Creek

Basin features
- Progression: Sewickley Creek → Youghiogheny River → Monongahela River → Ohio River → Mississippi River → Gulf of Mexico
- River system: Monongahela River
- Tributaries
  - left: unnamed tributaries
  - right: unnamed tributaries
- Waterbodies: Mammoth Lake
- Bridges: Shady Lane, Ankney Hill Road, PA 982, Welty Road, County Park Road, Klaka Road, County Road, Holly Place, Mt. Pleasant Road

Welty Run is a 6.59 mi (10.61 km) long 3rd order tributary to Sewickley Creek in Westmoreland County, Pennsylvania. This is the only stream of this name in the United States.

== Variant names ==
According to the Geographic Names Information System, it has also been known historically as:

- Welly Run

== Course ==
Welty Run rises about 3 miles southeast of Weltytown, Pennsylvania, and then flows west to join Sewickley Creek at Norvelt, Pennsylvania.

== Watershed ==
Welty Run drains 12.66 square miles (32.8 km^{2}) of area, receives about 44.4 in/year of precipitation, has a wetness index of 393.98, and is about 52% forested.
