= Little Sewickley Creek =

Stream in Pennsylvania, USA

Little Sewickley Creek Tributary to Sewickley Creek
- Location of Little Sewickley Creek mouth Little Sewickley Creek (the United States)

Location
- Country: United States
- State: Pennsylvania
- County: Westmoreland
- Borough: Herminie; Arona

Physical characteristics
- Source: Brush Creek divide
  - location: about 0.5 miles east of Lincoln Heights, Pennsylvania
  - coordinates: 40°18′41″N 079°36′14″W
  - elevation: 1,260 ft (380 m)
- Mouth: Sewickley Creek
  - location: Cowansburg, Pennsylvania
  - coordinates: 40°15′02″N 079°45′37″W
  - elevation: 758 ft (231 m)
- Length: 13.42 mi (21.60 km)
- Basin size: 30.79 square miles (79.7 km^{2})
- Discharge
  - location: Sewickley Creek
  - average: 36.61 cu ft/s (1.037 m^{3}/s) at mouth with Sewickley Creek

Basin features
- Progression: Sewickley Creek → Youghiogheny River → Monongahela River → Ohio River → Mississippi River → Gulf of Mexico
- River system: Monongahela River
- Tributaries
  - left: unnamed tributaries
  - right: Andrews Run
- Bridges: Walton Tea Room Road, PA 66, Marwood Forest Road, Walton Tea Room Road, Baughman Hollow Road, PA 66, PA 136, Whigham Road, Kocevar Lane, Rocky Mountain Road, Arona Road, I-76, Ladysmith Road, PA 136, Lash Road, Keystone Road, High Street, Clay Pike, Greenhills Road, Lowber Road (x3)

Little Sewickley Creek is a 13.42-mile-long (21.60 km) third-order tributary to Sewickley Creek in Westmoreland County, Pennsylvania.

== Course ==
Little Sewickley Creek rises about 0.5 miles (0.80 km) east of Lincoln Heights, Pennsylvania, and then flows west to join Sewickley Creek at Cowansburg, Pennsylvania.

== Watershed ==
Little Sewickley Creek drains 30.79 square miles (79.7 km^{2}) of area, receives about 40.7 inches per year (103 cm/year) of precipitation, has a wetness index of 343.54, and is about 49% forested.

== See also ==
- List of rivers of Pennsylvania
