= Buffalo Run (Sewickley Creek tributary) =

Stream in Pennsylvania, USA

Buffalo Run Tributary to Sewickley Creek
- Location of Buffalo Run mouth Buffalo Run (Sewickley Creek tributary) (the United States)

Location
- Country: United States
- State: Pennsylvania
- County: Westmoreland
- Borough: Hunker

Physical characteristics
- Source: Stauffer Run divide
  - location: West Bethany, Pennsylvania
  - coordinates: 40°10′49″N 079°40′26″W
  - elevation: 1,140 ft (350 m)
- Mouth: Sewickley Creek
  - location: Hunker, Pennsylvania
  - coordinates: 40°12′06″N 079°37′30″W
  - elevation: 917 ft (280 m)
- Length: 3.89 mi (6.26 km)
- Basin size: 10.12 square miles (26.2 km^{2})
- Discharge
  - location: Sewickley Creek
  - average: 13.61 cu ft/s (0.385 m^{3}/s) at mouth with Sewickley Creek

Basin features
- Progression: Sewickley Creek → Youghiogheny River → Monongahela River → Ohio River → Mississippi River → Gulf of Mexico
- River system: Monongahela River
- Tributaries
  - left: unnamed tributaries
  - right: unnamed tributaries
- Bridges: Hockey Road, Ruffsdale-Alverton Road, Leighty Hollow Road, PA 31, Railroad Street, State Route 3089, Thompson Hollow Road, State Route 3089 (x2)

Buffalo Run is a 3.89 mi (6.26 km) long 3rd order tributary to Sewickley Creek in Westmoreland County, Pennsylvania.

== Course ==
Buffalo Run rises at West Bethany, Pennsylvania, and then flows north-northwest to join Sewickley Creek at Hunker.

== Watershed ==
Buffalo Run drains 10.12 square miles (26.2 km^{2}) of area, receives about 41.5 in/year of precipitation, has a wetness index of 369.10, and is about 48% forested.
