= United, Pennsylvania =

Unincorporated community in Pennsylvania, US

Coordinates: 40°13′06″N 79°29′16″W

United is located in Mount Pleasant Township, Westmoreland County, Pennsylvania, United States. It is a community located near Norvelt.

== History ==
In 1881, the United Coal & Coke Company, organized by a group of Greensburg businessmen, opened the United Mine and Coke Works in Mount Pleasant Township. Served by the Sewickley Branch of the Southwest Pennsylvania Railroad. The United Mine had a shaft entry and employed nearly 200 men and boys. The company constructed houses for its workers and operated a company store. By 1886 United Coke Works contained 300 bee-hive coke ovens. That year, 1886 miners at United Mine produced more than 177,000 short tons (158,000 long tons; 161,000 t) of coal and its coke workers produced nearly 134,000 short tons (120,000 long tons; 122,000 t) of coke. F.M. Reynolds, who served as the initial head of United Coal & Coke Company, was succeeded by William C. Reynolds.

By the end of the 1880s, the H. C. Frick Coke Company had acquired a two-thirds interest in United Coal & Coke Company. H. C. Frick assumed complete control of the United Mine property in 1895. Five years later the H.C. Frick Coke Company produced 298,000 short tons (266,000 long tons; 270,000 t) of coal and 194,000 short tons (173,000 long tons; 176,000 t) of coke at the United Mine & Coke Works. Frick had expanded the United Coke Works to 350 coke ovens, employing 341 men and boys in the mine and coke yard. The company appointed R. E. Laughrey as superintendent at United Mine.

By 1910, however, H. C. Frick Coke Company was operating United Mine & Coke Works in conjunction with the nearby Calumet Mine & Coke Works. Robert Ramsay, a long-time superintendent and engineer at Frick's renowned Shaft Mines near Mount Pleasant, was brought in to manage the United Mine & Coke Works and the Calumet Mine & Coke Works. By this time the population of United had grown to 840 persons.

Through the 1910s United Mine produced annually as much as 300,000 short tons (270,000 long tons; 270,000 t) of coal and 197,000 short tons (176,000 long tons; 179,000 t) of coke. In 1919 the United Mine produced 297,115 short tons (265,281 long tons; 269,538 t) of coal, and shipped 154,747 short tons (138,167 long tons; 140,384 t) of coal. The United Coke Works produced 87,515 short tons (78,138 long tons; 79,392 t) of coke, with 157 coke ovens in operation. The mine and coke works operated 271 days in 1919, with 315 employees. There were five non-fatal accidents in 1919.

In 1920 the United Mine produced 208,553 short tons (186,208 long tons; 189,196 t) of coal, and shipped 41,399 short tons (36,963 long tons; 37,557 t) of coal. The United Coke Works produced 104,920 short tons (93,680 long tons; 95,180 t) of coke, with 174 coke ovens in operation. The mine and coke works operated 273 days, with 290 employees. There was one fatal accident and one non-fatal accident in 1920.

Production diminished in the early 1920s, dropping to less than 30,000 short tons (27,000 long tons; 27,000 t) of coal a year. By 1926, however the United Mine was reaching its greatest output, producing more than 400,000 short tons (360,000 long tons; 360,000 t) of coal, most of which was being shipped to other coking plants. As with most of the H. C. Frick mines, coal at United was still extracted largely by hand.

The H. C. Frick Coke Company closed and abandoned the United Mine and Coke Works in 1930. The United Mine's tipple was dismantled in 1931. United Mine produced only about 36,000 short tons (32,000 long tons; 33,000 t) of coal and employed 108 miners in its last year of operation. There were 350 bee-hive coke ovens still standing at the United Coke Works when the United Mine closed.
