= Hutchinson, Pennsylvania =

Unincorporated community in Pennsylvania, US

Hutchinson
- Village
- Location within the U.S. state of Pennsylvania Hutchinson (the United States)
- Coordinates: 40°13′34″N 79°43′59″W
- Country: United States
- State: Pennsylvania
- County: Westmoreland

Population (2000)
  - Total: 322
- Time zone: UTC-5 (Eastern (EST))
  - Summer (DST): UTC-4 (EDT)

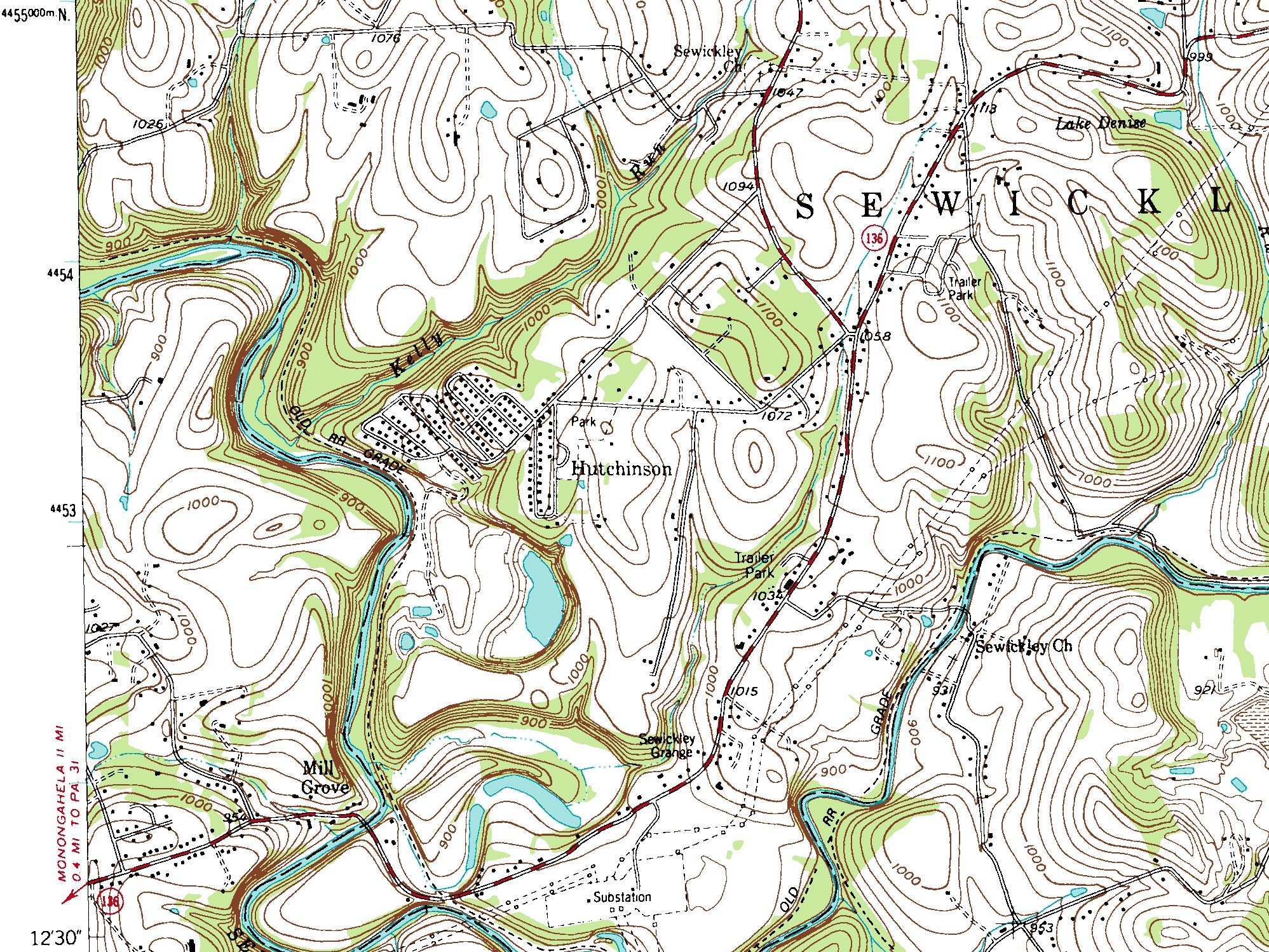
USGS Map of Hutchinson

Hutchinson is a village located in Westmoreland County, Pennsylvania, United States, and is part of Sewickley Township. As of the 2000 census, Hutchinson had 99 single family homes, and a total population of 322. Although only about the size of a small subdivision, Hutchinson has its own post office and zip code: 15640. Hutchinson was built as a coal mining town in 1924, and is geographically located above the Hutchinson Mine.

The community was named for S. P. Hutchinson, president of Westmoreland Coal Company at the time the town was built. Because it was built much later than nearby "coal patch" towns, Hutchinson was distinguished by an unusually spacious layout, in which houses had larger yards than one would find in older coal mining communities.

== Hutchinson Sewage Project ==
In late 2017, crews broke ground on a multimillion-dollar project in order to bring sewage to the small village. Construction of initial sewage piping concluded in the spring of 2018 but the sewage plant added at the end of Jackson Street did not cease until summer of 2018. The resident were given notice to tap in to the sewage lines at the beginning of October 2018 and had only 90 days to tap in. The sewage plant's usage started at the beginning of January 2019 for the public.
