= Collinsburg, Pennsylvania =

Unincorporated community in Pennsylvania, US

Coordinates: 40°13′27″N 79°46′06″W

- Census-designated place
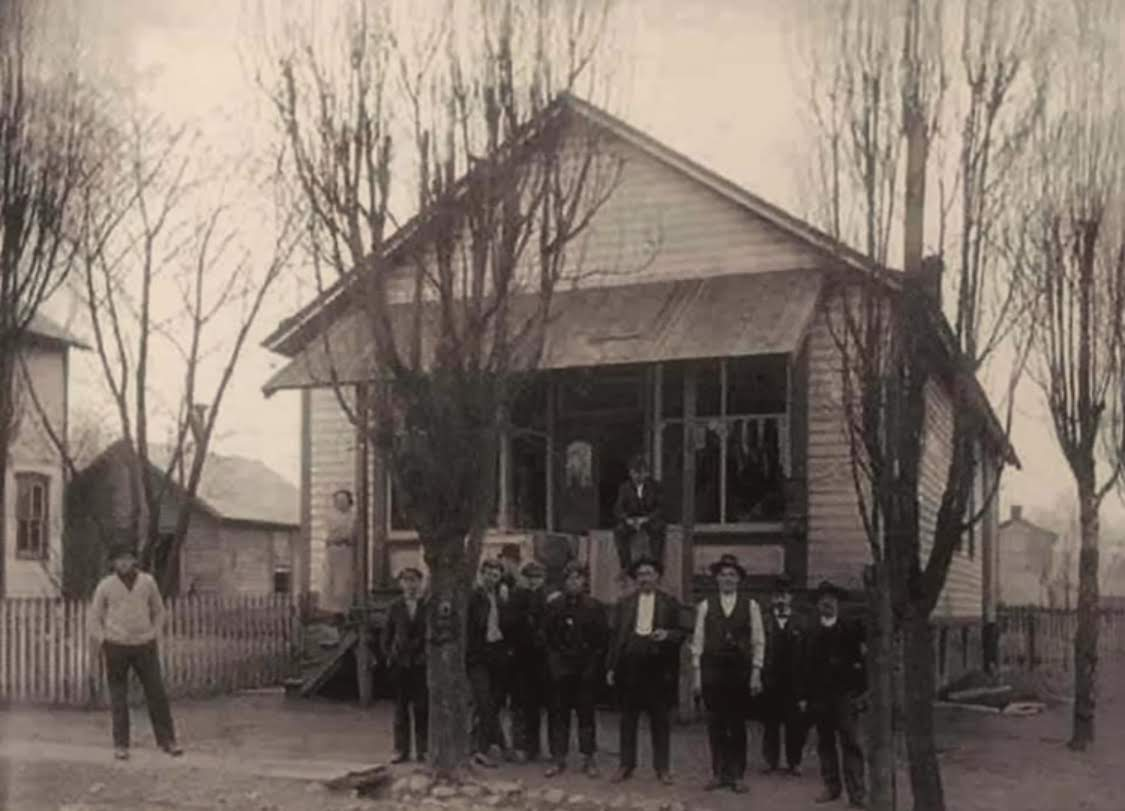
- The first store built in Collinsburg, in the early 20th century
- Interactive map of Collinsburg, Pennsylvania
- Country: United States
- State: Pennsylvania
- County: Westmoreland

Area
  - Total: 1.80 sq mi (4.66 km^{2})
  - Land: 1.78 sq mi (4.60 km^{2})
  - Water: 0.023 sq mi (0.06 km^{2})

Population (2020)
  - Total: 1,048
  - Density: 589.8/sq mi (227.74/km^{2})
- Time zone: UTC-5 (Eastern (EST))
  - Summer (DST): UTC-4 (EDT)
- FIPS code: 42-15248

Collinsburg is a census-designated place located in Rostraver Township, Westmoreland County in the state of Pennsylvania, United States. As of the 2010 census the population was 1,125 residents.

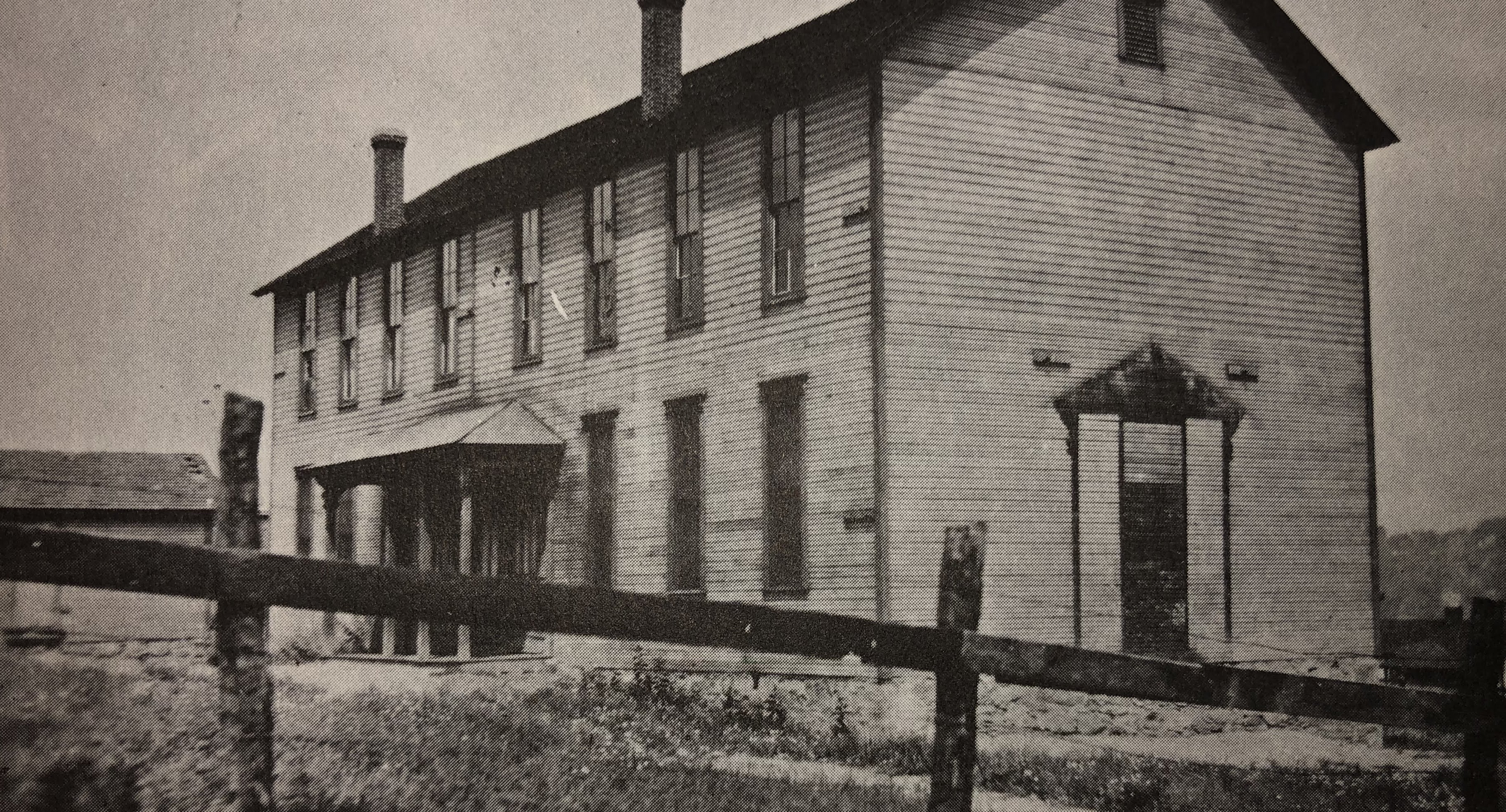
This structure was one of the first built in the village of Collinsburg Pennsylvania

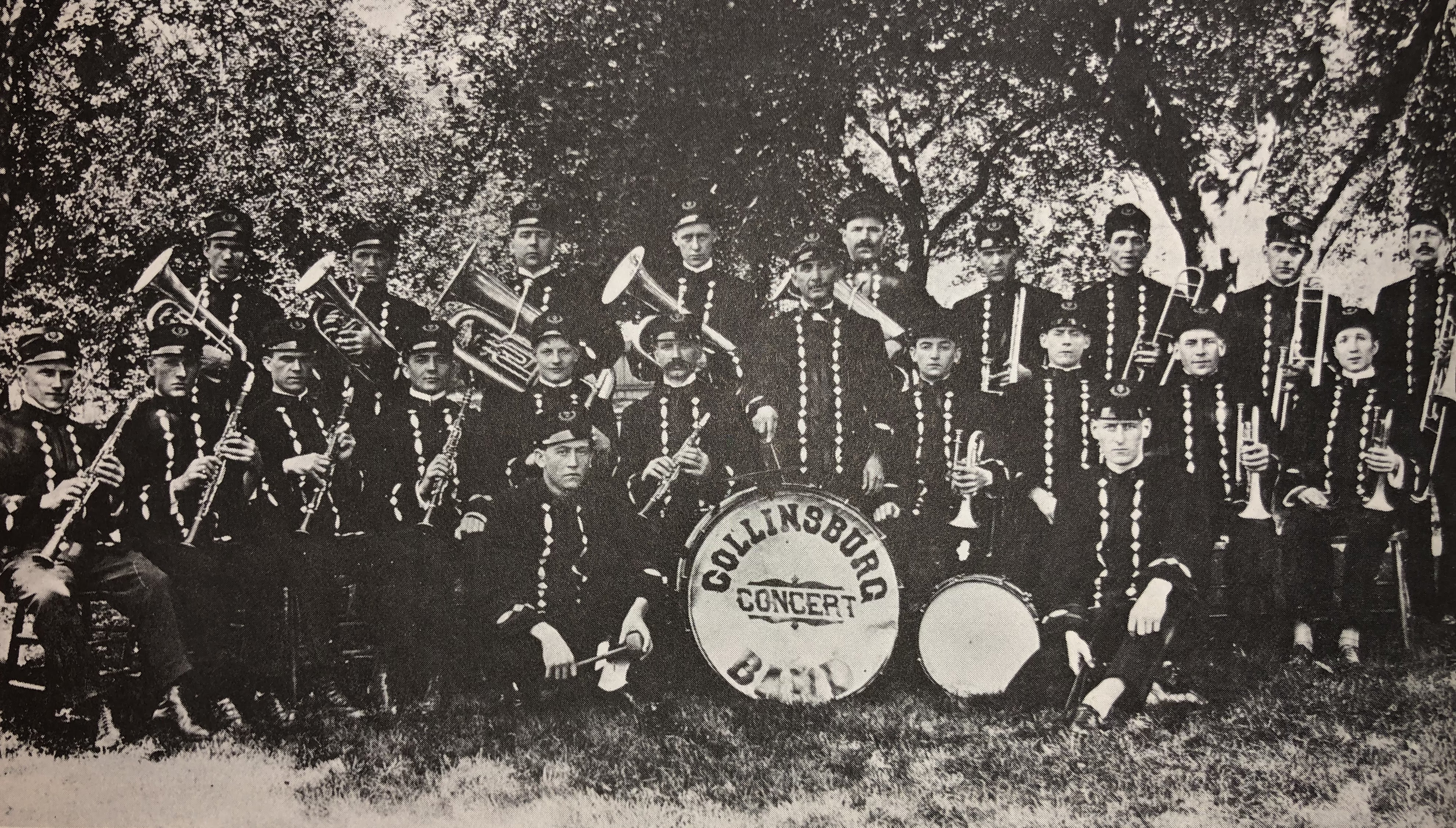
The community of Collinsburg established a village band in the late 19th century/early 20th century.

== Demographics ==
Historical population
Census	Pop.	Note	%±
2020	1,048		—
U.S. Decennial Census
