= Hannastown, Pennsylvania =

Unincorporated community in Pennsylvania, US

Hannastown
- Unincorporated community
- Location within the U.S. state of Pennsylvania Hannastown (the United States)
- Coordinates: 40°21′19″N 79°30′0″W
- Country: United States
- State: Pennsylvania
- County: Westmoreland
- Time zone: UTC-5 (Eastern (EST))
  - Summer (DST): UTC-4 (EDT)

Hannastown is an unincorporated community and former coal company town located in Hempfield Township, Westmoreland County, Pennsylvania, United States. Although the village is not tracked by the Census Bureau, it has been assigned the ZIP code 15635. Hannastown was established by the Jamison Coal & Coke Company as part of its mining and coking operations in 1899.

== History ==
Hannastown is located near the site of Historic Hanna’s Town, established as the first seat of Westmoreland County in 1773.

The Hannastown coal town was established by the Jamison Coal & Coke Company in 1899. The Jamison Coal & Coke Company was among the major coal and coke producers in Westmoreland County in the early 20th century. Formed in 1892, Jamison was based in Greensburg and operated mines at Luxor, Hannastown, Crabtree, Forbes Road, Highland, and Pleasant Unity.

The Jamison Coal & Coke Company opened the Hannastown mine in 1899. Hannastown, known as No. 2, was the second of Jamison’s coal properties after Luxor. Hannastown had a shaft-entry mine and used beehive ovens to transform coal into coke. It was serviced by the Alexandria branch of the Pennsylvania Railroad.

By 1910, Hannastown was the center of Jamison’s mining and coking operations, mining over 655,000 tons of coal and producing 292,000 tons of coke in 516 beehive ovens. At its peak in the 1910s, Hannastown employed up to 635 people. The Jamison Supply Company, which managed company stores in each of Jamison’s company towns, was based at Hannastown. About one-third of Jamison's corporate earnings were derived from workers making purchases at company stores, a trend observed across southwestern Pennsylvania in the early 20th century.

In the early 1920s, the Jamison company struggled amid a postwar slump in the market and the United Mine Workers coal strike of 1922. From 1922 to 1930, Jamison leased its mines, including Hannastown, to the Keystone Coal & Coke Company. Jamison resumed control of the Westmoreland County mines in 1930. By 1940, employed 375 miners and produced 3,500 tons of coal daily.

Jamison closed the Hannastown operation in 1949. Structures related to the mine and coke works were later demolished. The beehive ovens were buried with coal refuse in 1972. About 80 company-built houses remain, which are now private residences.
