= Wilson Run (Sewickley Creek tributary) =

Stream in Pennsylvania, USA

Wilson Run Tributary to Sewickley Creek
- Location of Wilson Run mouth Wilson Run (Sewickley Creek tributary) (the United States)

Location
- Country: United States
- State: Pennsylvania
- County: Westmoreland

Physical characteristics
- Source: Sherrick Run divide
  - location: about 0.5 miles northwest of Mount Pleasant, Pennsylvania
  - coordinates: 40°10′41″N 079°31′42″W
  - elevation: 1,175 ft (358 m)
- Mouth: Sewickley Creek
  - location: Paintersville, Pennsylvania
  - coordinates: 40°12′36″N 079°36′23″W
  - elevation: 935 ft (285 m)
- Length: 5.64 mi (9.08 km)
- Basin size: 7.42 square miles (19.2 km^{2})
- Discharge
  - location: Sewickley Creek
  - average: 10.13 cu ft/s (0.287 m^{3}/s) at mouth with Sewickley Creek

Basin features
- Progression: Sewickley Creek → Youghiogheny River → Monongahela River → Ohio River → Mississippi River → Gulf of Mexico
- River system: Monongahela River
- Tributaries
  - left: unnamed tributaries
  - right: unnamed tributaries
- Bridges: Brook Hollow Road, PA 819, Simpson Hollow Road, Frye Hollow Street, Sportsmen Road, Fry Hollow Road, King Thorne Road, S Center Avenue

Wilson Run is a 5.64 mi (9.08 km) long 2nd order tributary to Sewickley Creek in Westmoreland County, Pennsylvania.

== Course ==
Wilson Run rises about 0.5 miles northwest of Mount Pleasant, Pennsylvania, and then flows northwest to join Sewickley Creek at Paintersville.

== Watershed ==
Wilson Run drains 7.42 square miles (19.2 km^{2}) of area, receives about 41.8 in/year of precipitation, has a wetness index of 368.30, and is about 51% forested.
