= Armbrust, Pennsylvania =

Unincorporated community in Pennsylvania, US

- Unincorporated community
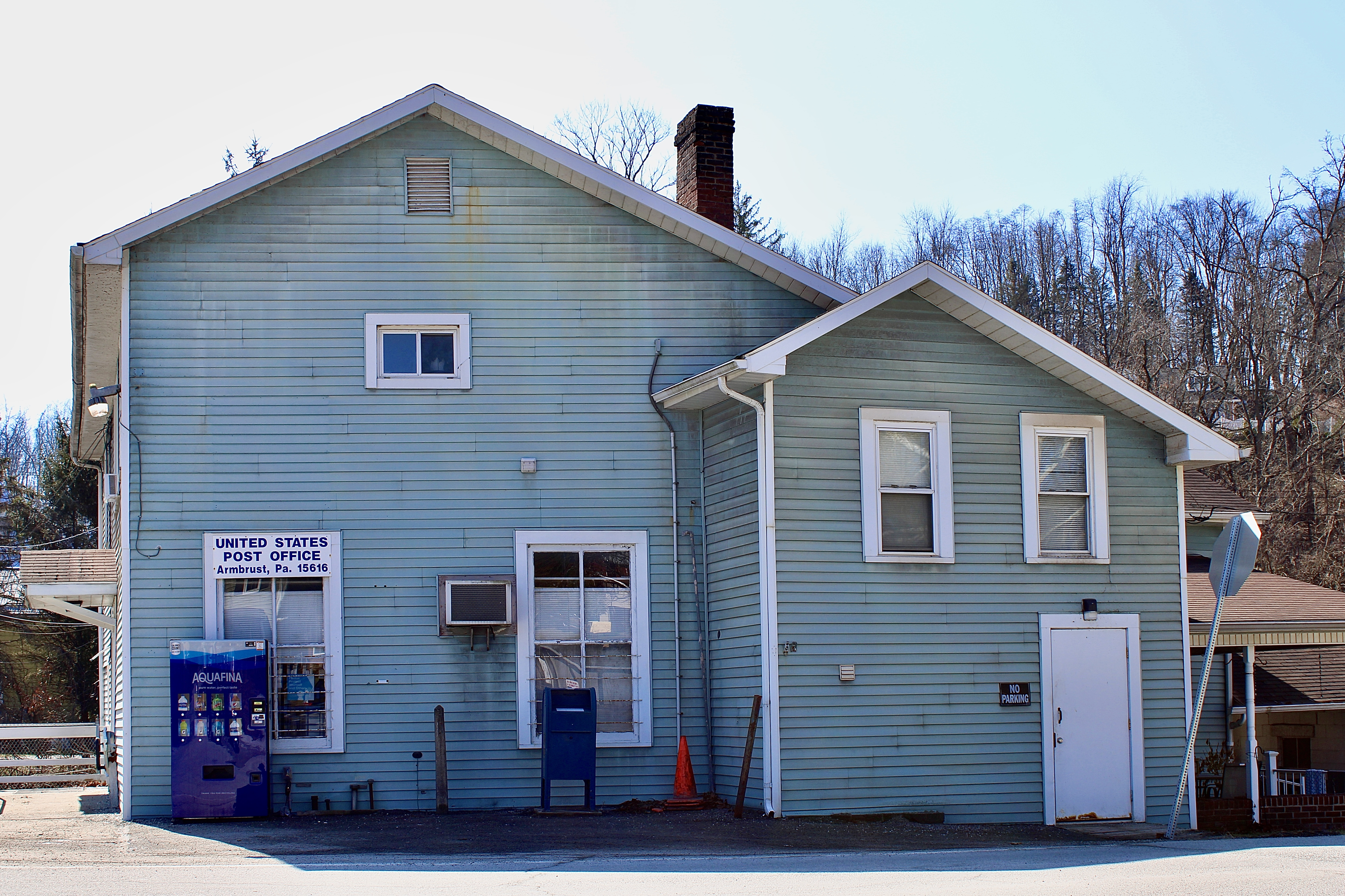
- Armbrust post office

- Location within Pennsylvania
- Coordinates: 40°13′25″N 79°33′04″W
- Country: United States
- State: Pennsylvania
- County: Westmoreland
- Elevation: 968 ft (295 m)
- Time zone: UTC-5 (Eastern (EST))
  - Summer (DST): UTC-4 (EDT)
- ZIP code: 15616
- Area code: 724
- GNIS feature ID: 1168397

Armbrust is an unincorporated community which is located in Hempfield Township, Westmoreland County, Pennsylvania, United States. The community is situated along Pennsylvania Route 819, 1.8 miles (2.9 km) southeast of Youngwood.

== History ==
Armbrust has a post office with ZIP code 15616, which opened on June 25, 1856.

Initially named as Weaver's Old Stand, the town was renamed, during the late 1880s, after a postmaster with the last name of Armbrust. Central (aka Feightner) Cemetery, located two miles north, contains twenty-nine gravestones with the surname Armbrust. The oldest (based on date of death) is that of Margaret G. Armbrust, who died in 1895.

Census records for the year 1900 show numerous people with the surname Armbrust living nearby in Hempfield Township.

== Gallery ==
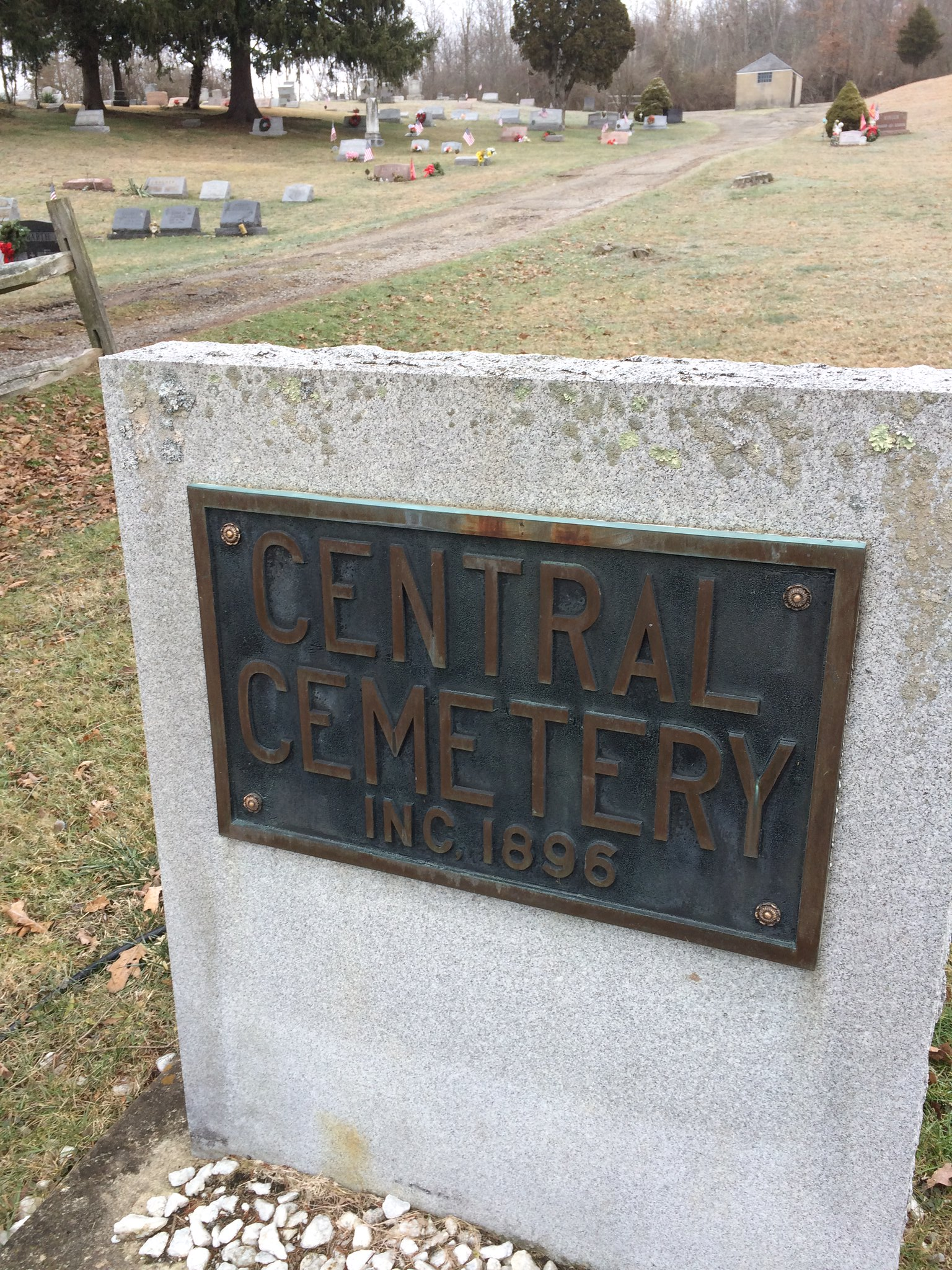
Entrance sign, Central (aka Feightner) Cemetery, Armbrust Rd., PA Route 819, Hempfield Township

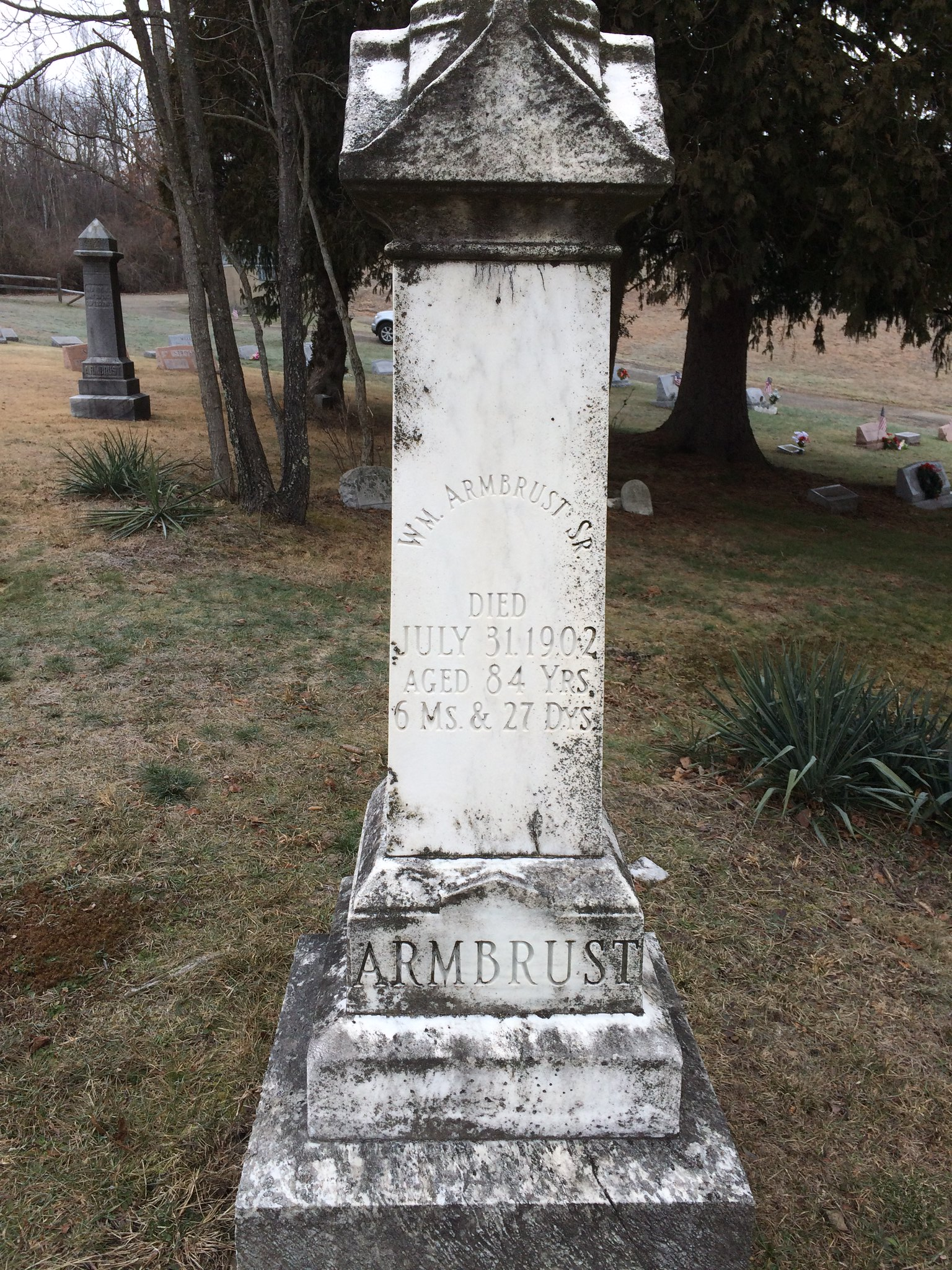
Armbrust family grave marker, 1902

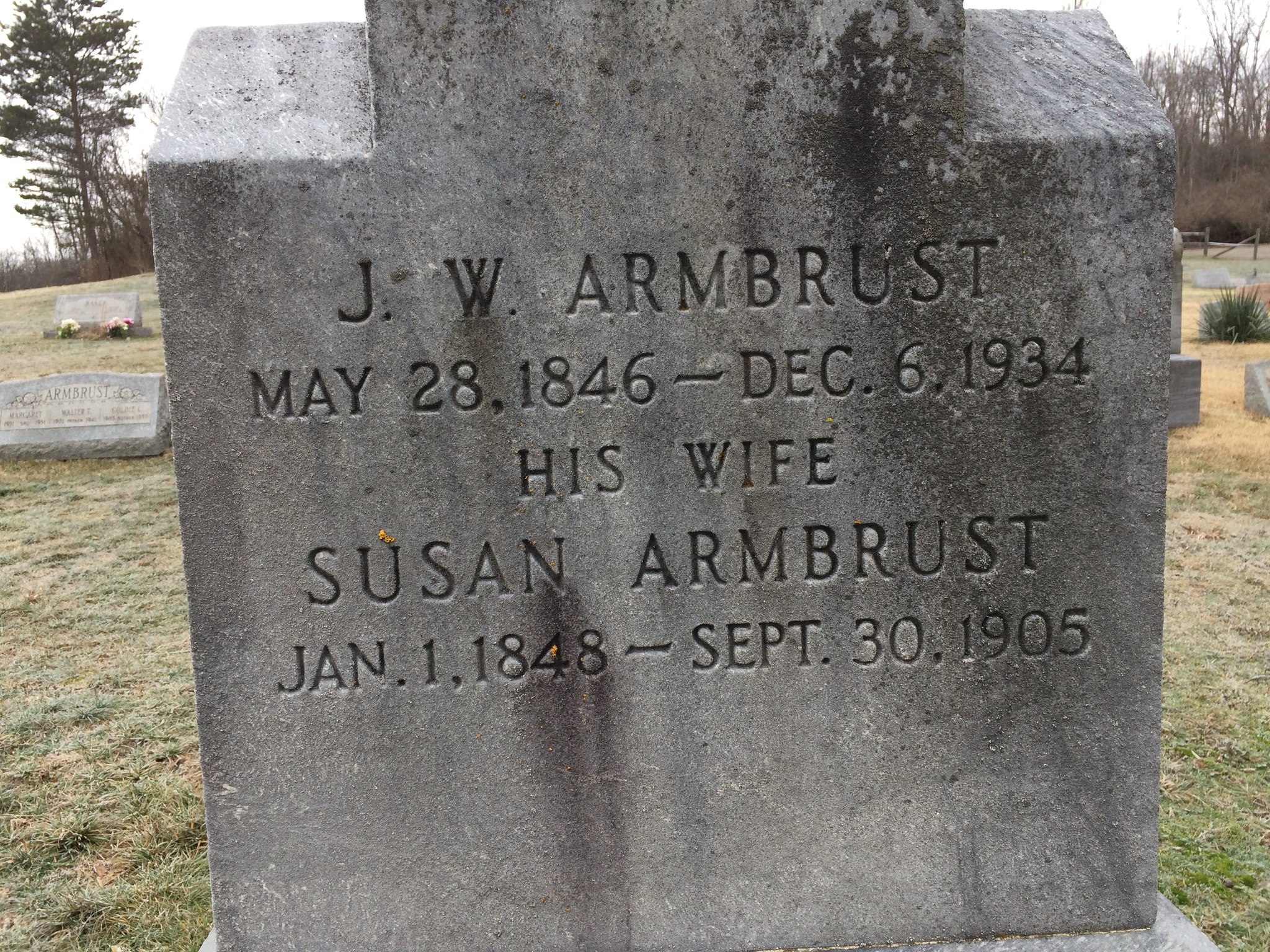
Armbrust family grave marker, 1905

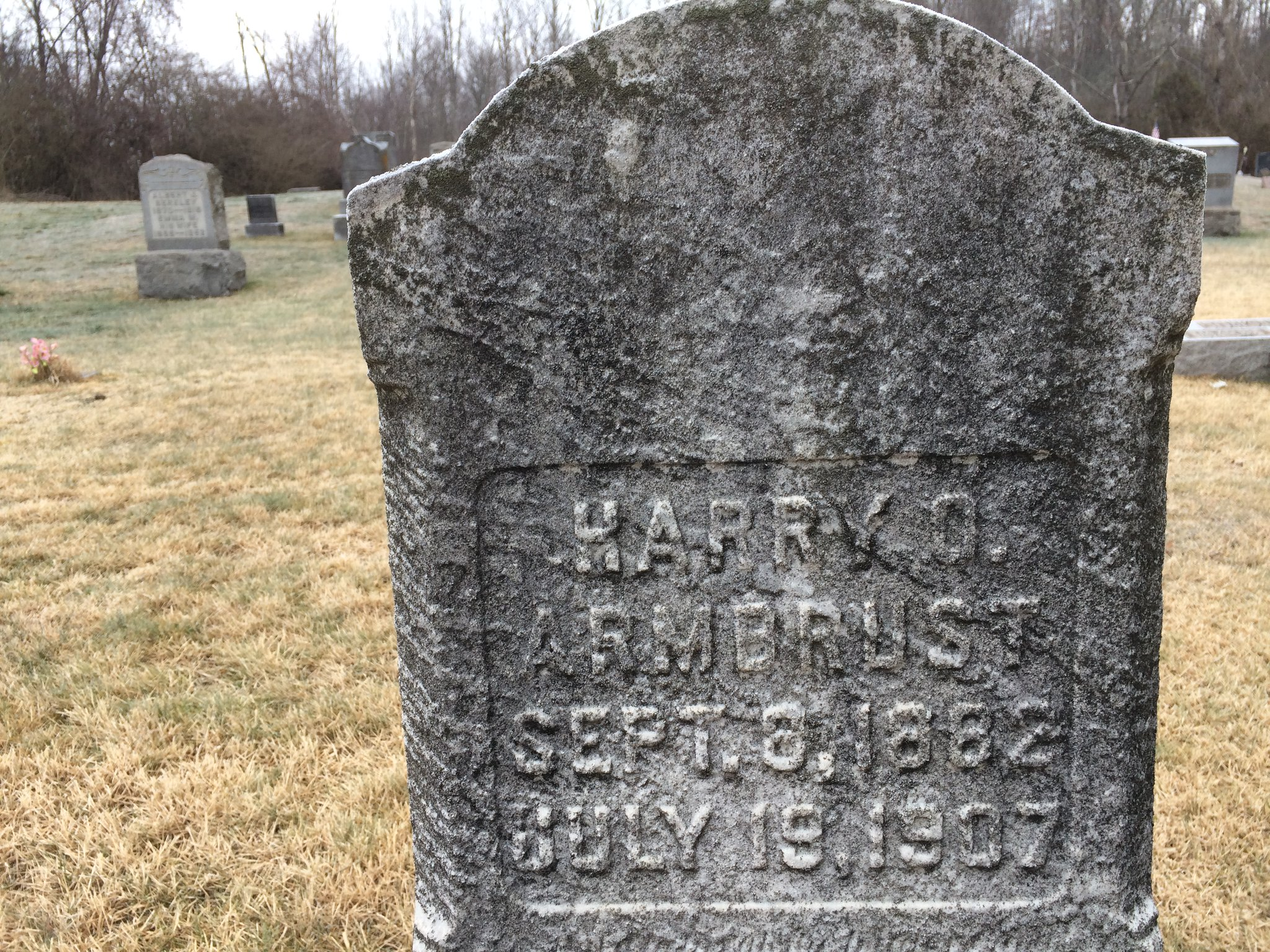
Armbrust family grave marker, 1907
