= Standard Shaft, Pennsylvania =

Unincorporated community in Pennsylvania, US

Coordinates: 40°09′53″N 79°31′59″W

Standard Shaft is an unincorporated community located near Mount Pleasant, Westmoreland County, Pennsylvania, United States, in Mount Pleasant Township.

== History ==
Standard Shaft, sometimes just called Shaft by the locals, refers to the community that had its roots in the Standard Shaft Mine operation. It was founded in 1886 by the H. C. Frick Coke Company.

c. 1932, the H. C. Frick Coke Company closed and abandoned the Calumet Mine, located in nearby Calumet and sent a number of the miners to the Standard Shaft Mine near Mount Pleasant, and laid off the rest of the coal miners, leaving them to fend for themselves, with no compensation or means of support.
