= Wyano, Pennsylvania =

Unincorporated community in Pennsylvania, US

Coordinates: 40°11′50″N 79°41′50″W

- Census-designated place
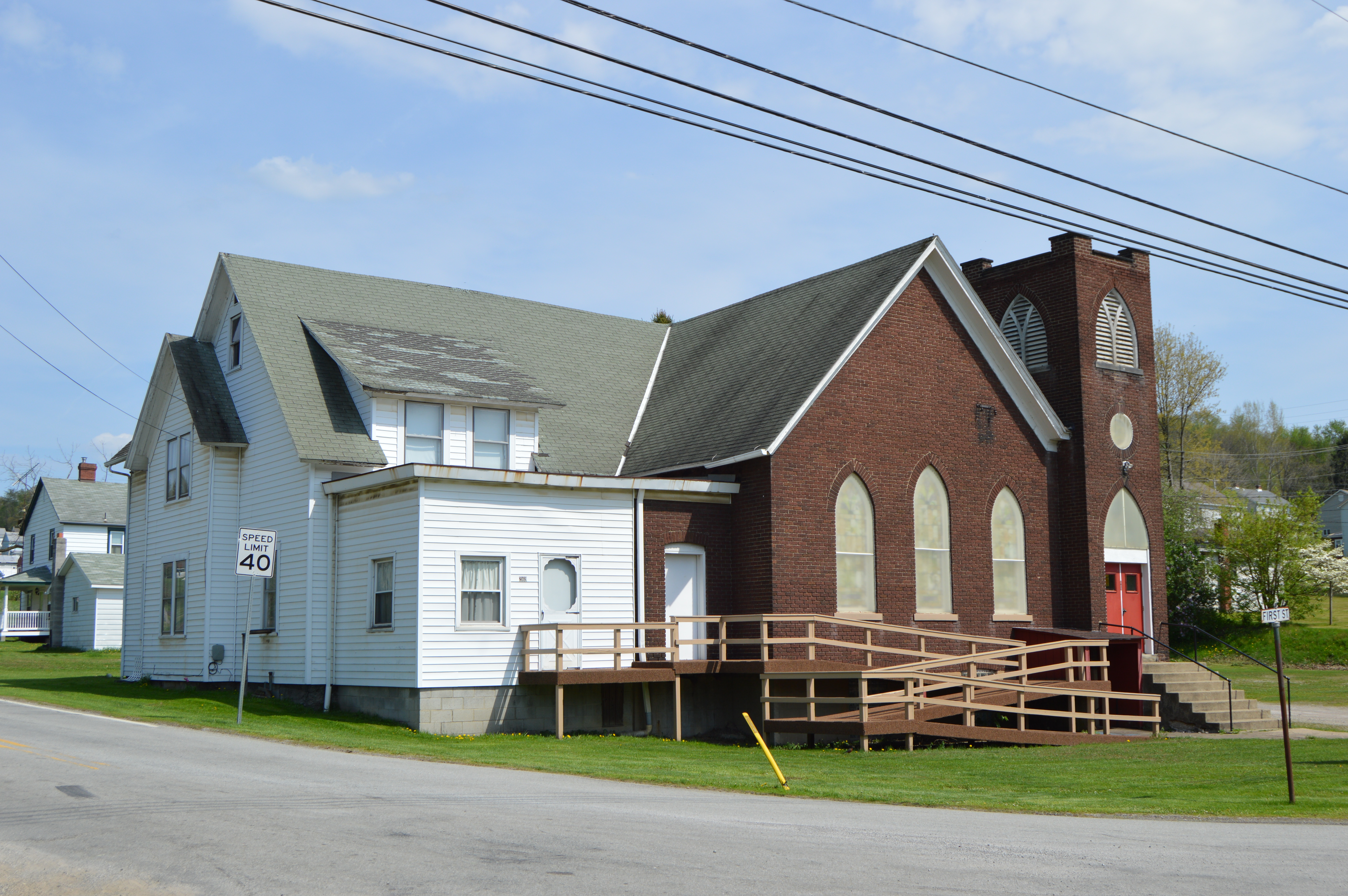
- Methodist church on First Street
- Interactive map of Wyano, Pennsylvania
- Country: United States
- State: Pennsylvania
- County: Westmoreland

Population (2020 Decennial Census)
  - Total: 433
- Time zone: UTC-5 (Eastern (EST))
  - Summer (DST): UTC-4 (EDT)
- ZIP codes: 15695

Wyano is a census-designated place located in South Huntingdon Township, Westmoreland County in the state of Pennsylvania, United States. The community is located just to the west of Interstate 70. As of the 2020 United States decennial census the population was 433 residents.

== History ==
Bituminous coal was plentiful in the area around Wyano. Local mines included The Youghiogheny and Ohio Coal Company's Osborne mines (in operation as early as 1915) and the Pittsburgh Coal Company's Eureka mine. Both were in South Huntington Township. By 1920 the town had its own post office and company store.
