= Yukon, Pennsylvania =

Unincorporated community in Pennsylvania, US

Coordinates: 40°12′45″N 79°40′58″W

- Census-designated place
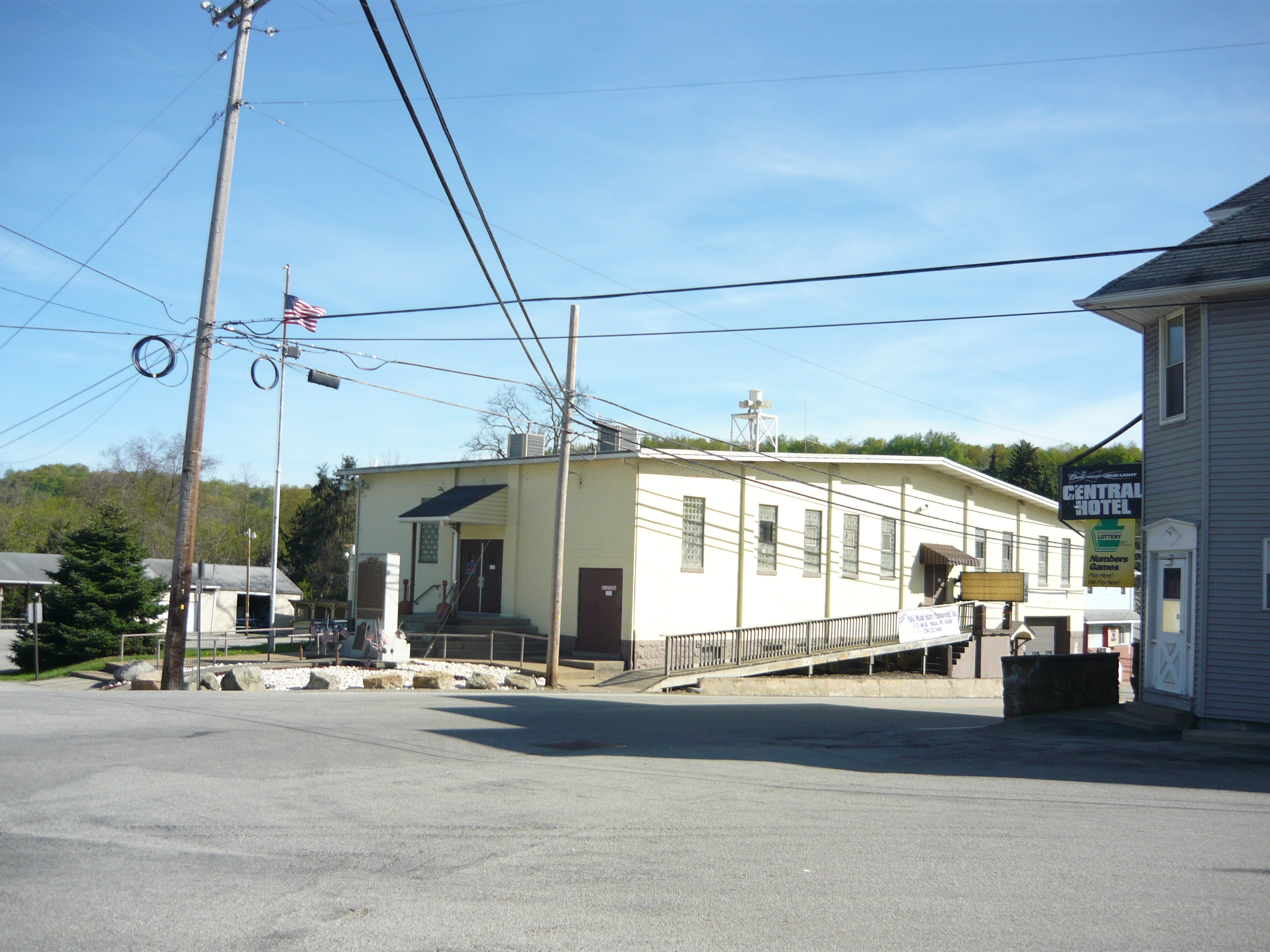
- Station Street
- Interactive map of Yukon, Pennsylvania
- Country: United States
- State: Pennsylvania
- County: Westmoreland

Population (2010)
  - Total: 677
- Time zone: UTC-5 (Eastern (EST))
  - Summer (DST): UTC-4 (EDT)
- ZIP Code: 15698
- Area code: 724

Yukon is a census-designated place located in South Huntingdon Township, Westmoreland County in the state of Pennsylvania, United States. The community is located near Interstate 70, north of the village of Wyano. As of the 2010 census the population was 677 residents.

== Labor history ==
Yukon was the epicenter of the Slovak Strike of 1910-1911. On May 8, 1911, Westmoreland County Sheriff Deputies fired into a crowd of labor protesters.
