= Youngwood, Pennsylvania =

Borough in Pennsylvania, US

- Borough
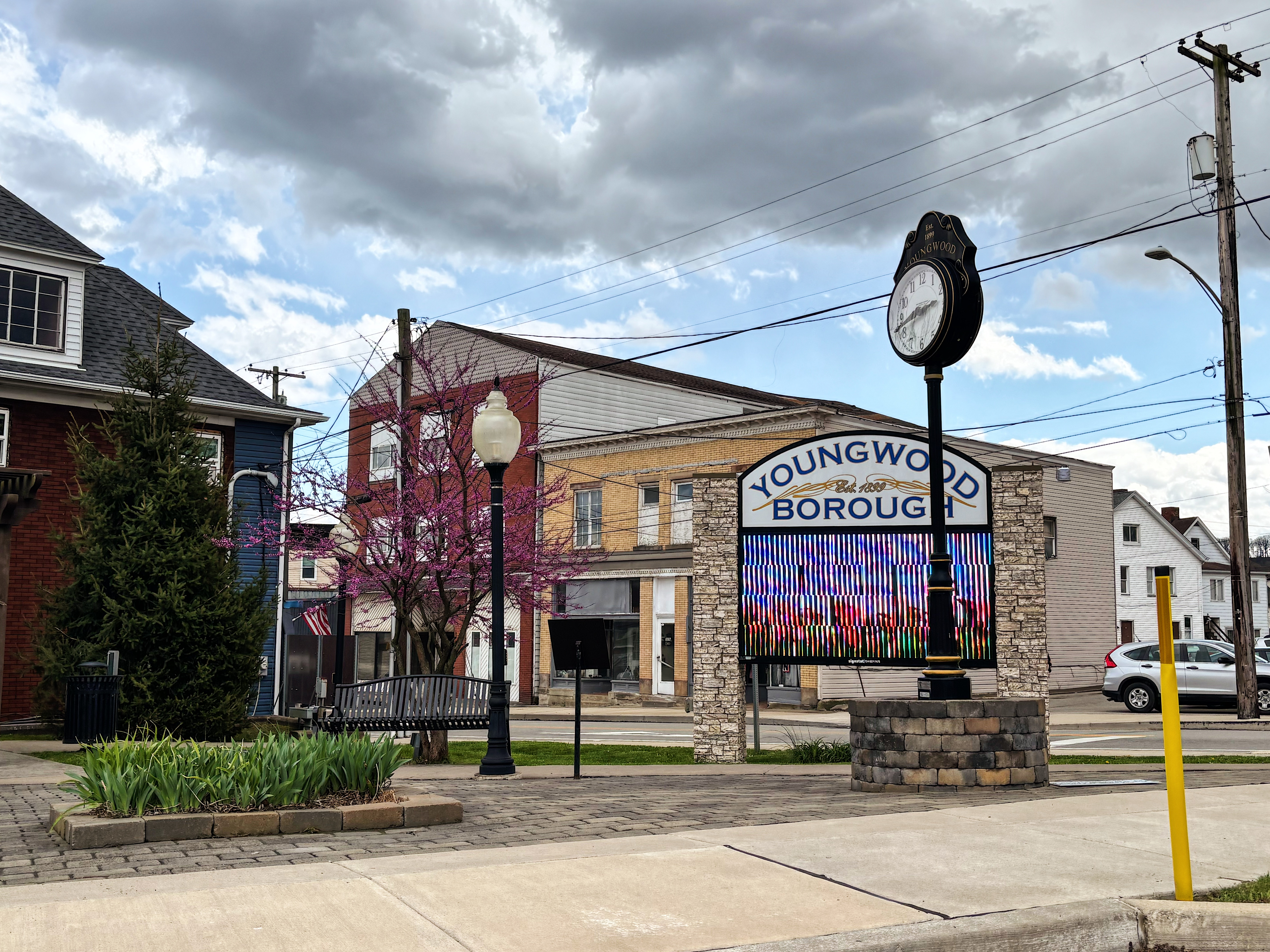
- Youngwood business district (Depot Street)

- Location of Youngwood in Westmoreland County, Pennsylvania.

- Location within Pennsylvania
- Coordinates: 40°14′22″N 79°34′50″W
- Country: United States
- State: Pennsylvania
- County: Westmoreland
- Settled: 1899
- Incorporated: November 10, 1902

Government
  - Type: Borough Council

Area
  - Total: 1.92 sq mi (4.98 km^{2})
  - Land: 1.92 sq mi (4.97 km^{2})
  - Water: 0.0039 sq mi (0.01 km^{2})
- Elevation: 954 ft (291 m)

Population (2020)
  - Total: 2,975
- Time zone: UTC-5 (Eastern (EST))
  - Summer (DST): UTC-4 (EDT)
- Zip code: 15697
- Area code: 724
- FIPS code: 42-87232
- Website: http://www.youngwood.org

Youngwood is a borough in Westmoreland County, Pennsylvania, United States. As of the 2020 census, Youngwood had a population of 2,975.

== History ==
The community was established in 1899 and was built on land owned by John Y. Woods, a farmer. In creating the name Youngwood, John Y. Woods took his own family name and combined it with his maternal grandfather's name, which was Young.

Youngwood owes its existence to the Southwest Branch of the Pennsylvania Railroad, which ran from Greensburg south to Uniontown and Fairchance. In 1900, a large classification yard was built for sorting railroad cars, and this railroad yard provided Youngwood's economic base for many decades.

Youngwood became a borough on November 10, 1902. The year 1902 was also the date of Youngwood's railroad station, which still stands on Depot Street.

== Geography ==
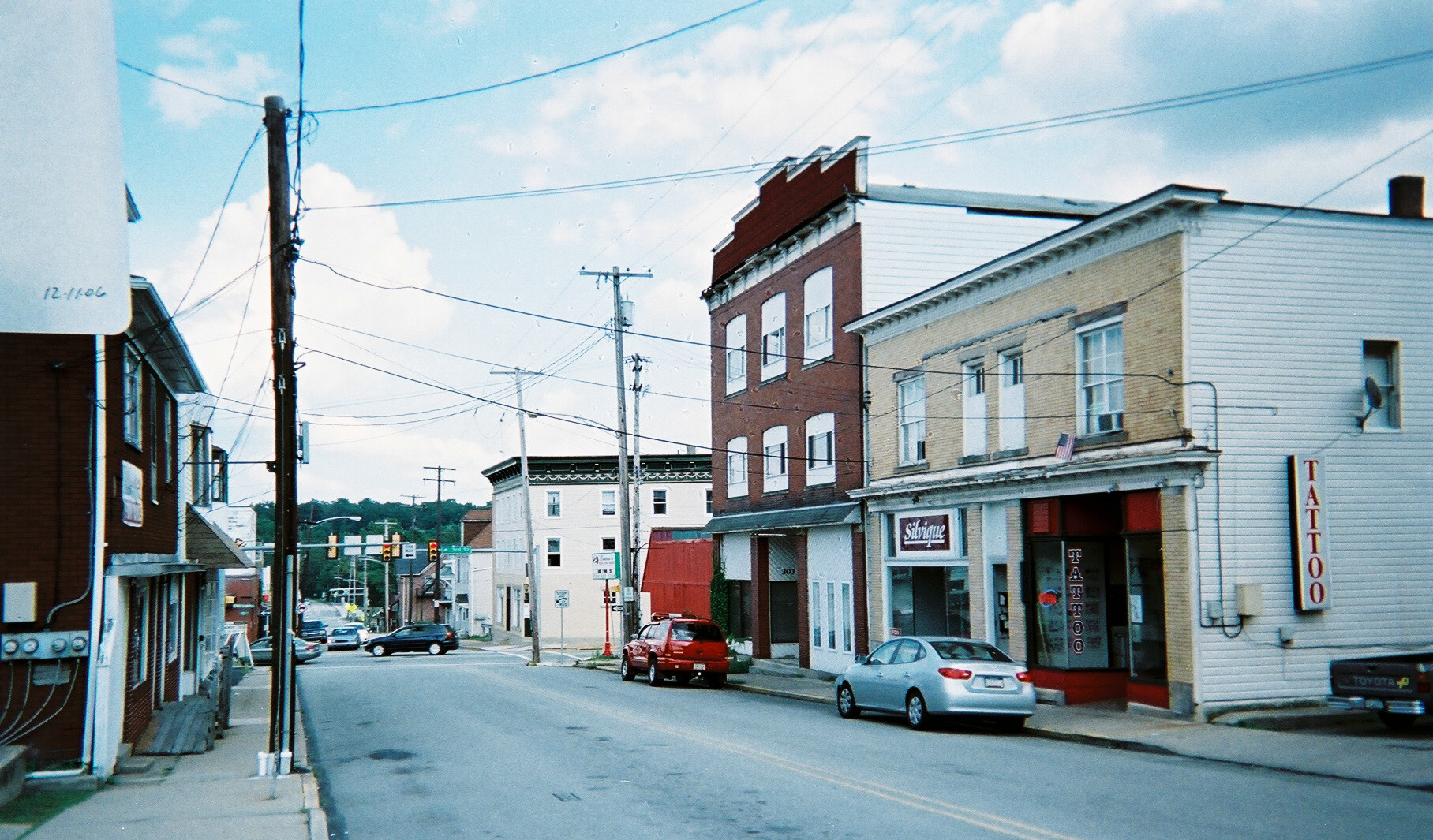
Depot Street

Youngwood is located at 40°14′22″N 79°34′50″W (40.239566, -79.580686).

According to the United States Census Bureau, the borough has a total area of 1.9 square miles (4.9 km^{2}), of which 1.8 square miles (4.7 km^{2}) is land and 0.04 square miles (0.10 km^{2}) (1.08%) is water.

== Surrounding neighborhoods ==
Youngwood is almost entirely surrounded by Hempfield Township; the only other border is with New Stanton to the southwest.

== Demographics ==
Historical population
Census	Pop.	Note	%±
1910	1,881		—
1920	2,275		20.9%
1930	2,783		22.3%
1940	2,546		−8.5%
1950	2,720		6.8%
1960	2,813		3.4%
1970	3,057		8.7%
1980	3,749		22.6%
1990	3,372		−10.1%
2000	4,138		22.7%
2010	3,050		−26.3%
2020	2,975		−2.5%
Sources: 2020:

As of the census of 2000, there were 4,138 people, 1,506 households, and 891 families living in the borough. The population density was 2,249.2 inhabitants per square mile (868.4/km^{2}). There were 1,601 housing units at an average density of 870.2 units per square mile (336.0 units/km^{2}). The racial makeup of the borough was 87.68% White, 11.65% African American, 0.24% Native American, 0.17% Asian, 0.02% from other races, and 0.24% from two or more races. Hispanic or Latino of any race were 2.37% of the population.

There were 1,506 households, out of which 23.5% had children under the age of 18 living with them, 45.9% were married couples living together, 10.2% had a female householder with no husband present, and 40.8% were non-families. 36.3% of all households were made up of individuals, and 14.9% had someone living alone who was 65 years of age or older. The average household size was 2.14 and the average family size was 2.79.

In the borough the population was spread out, with 14.7% under the age of 18, 8.5% from 18 to 24, 38.4% from 25 to 44, 21.7% from 45 to 64, and 16.8% who were 65 years of age or older. The median age was 39 years. For every 100 females there were 136.9 males. For every 100 females age 18 and over, there were 143.4 males.

The median income for a household in the borough was $32,917, and the median income for a family was $43,942. Males had a median income of $32,596 versus $22,429 for females. The per capita income for the borough was $17,715. About 3.1% of families and 5.7% of the population were below the poverty line, including 2.7% of those under age 18 and 7.8% of those age 65 or over.

== Higher education ==
The main campus of Westmoreland County Community College is located in Youngwood.

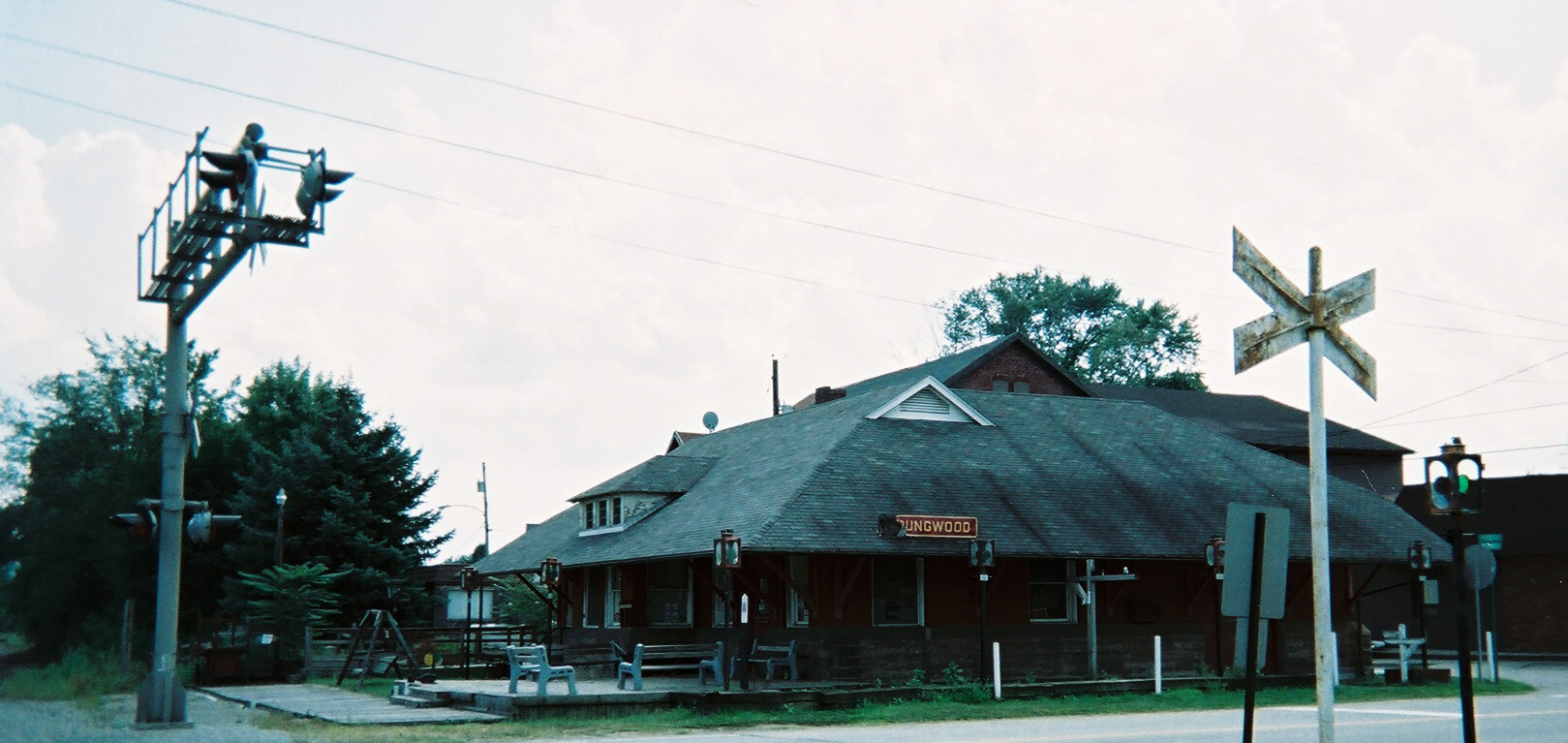
Former railroad station (1902), now a museum

== Notable person ==
- George Blanda, quarterback, kicker and member of the Pro Football Hall of Fame, was born in Youngwood.
