= Hunker, Pennsylvania =

Borough in Pennsylvania, US

- Borough
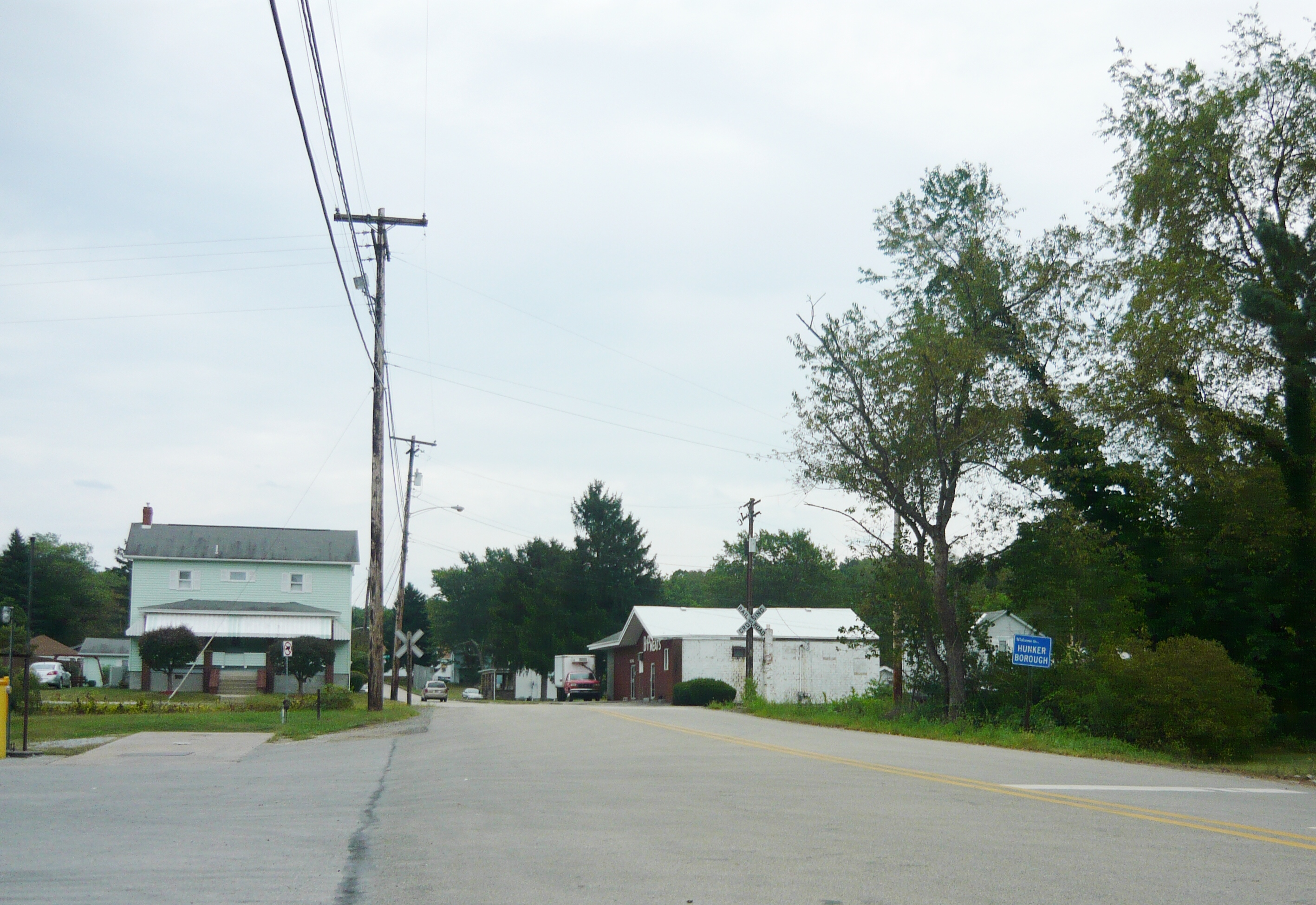
- Bridge Street

- Location of Hunker in Westmoreland County, Pennsylvania.

- Location within Pennsylvania
- Coordinates: 40°12′16″N 79°36′58″W
- Country: United States
- State: Pennsylvania
- County: Westmoreland
- Settled: 1903
- Incorporated: 1929

Government
  - Type: Borough Council

Area
  - Total: 0.25 sq mi (0.66 km^{2})
  - Land: 0.25 sq mi (0.66 km^{2})
  - Water: 0 sq mi (0.00 km^{2})
- Elevation: 994 ft (303 m)

Population (2020)
  - Total: 310
  - Density: 1,224.9/sq mi (472.92/km^{2})
- Time zone: UTC-5 (Eastern (EST))
  - Summer (DST): UTC-4 (EDT)
- Zip code: 15639
- FIPS code: 42-36288
- Website: https://hunkerborough.com/

Hunker is a borough which is located in Westmoreland County, Pennsylvania, United States. Settled in 1903, it became part of the Pittsburgh metropolitan area in 1950. It is south of the borough of New Stanton.

The population was 307 at the time of the 2020 census.

== Geography ==
Hunker is located at 40°12′16″N 79°36′58″W (40.204462, −79.616218).

According to the United States Census Bureau, the borough has a total area of 0.4 square miles (1.0 km^{2}), all land.

== Demographics ==
Historical population
Census	Pop.	Note	%±
1930	378		—
1940	348		−7.9%
1950	404		16.1%
1960	380		−5.9%
1970	375		−1.3%
1980	359		−4.3%
1990	328		−8.6%
2000	329		0.3%
2010	291		−11.6%
2020	310		6.5%
2021 (est.)	305	▼	−1.6%

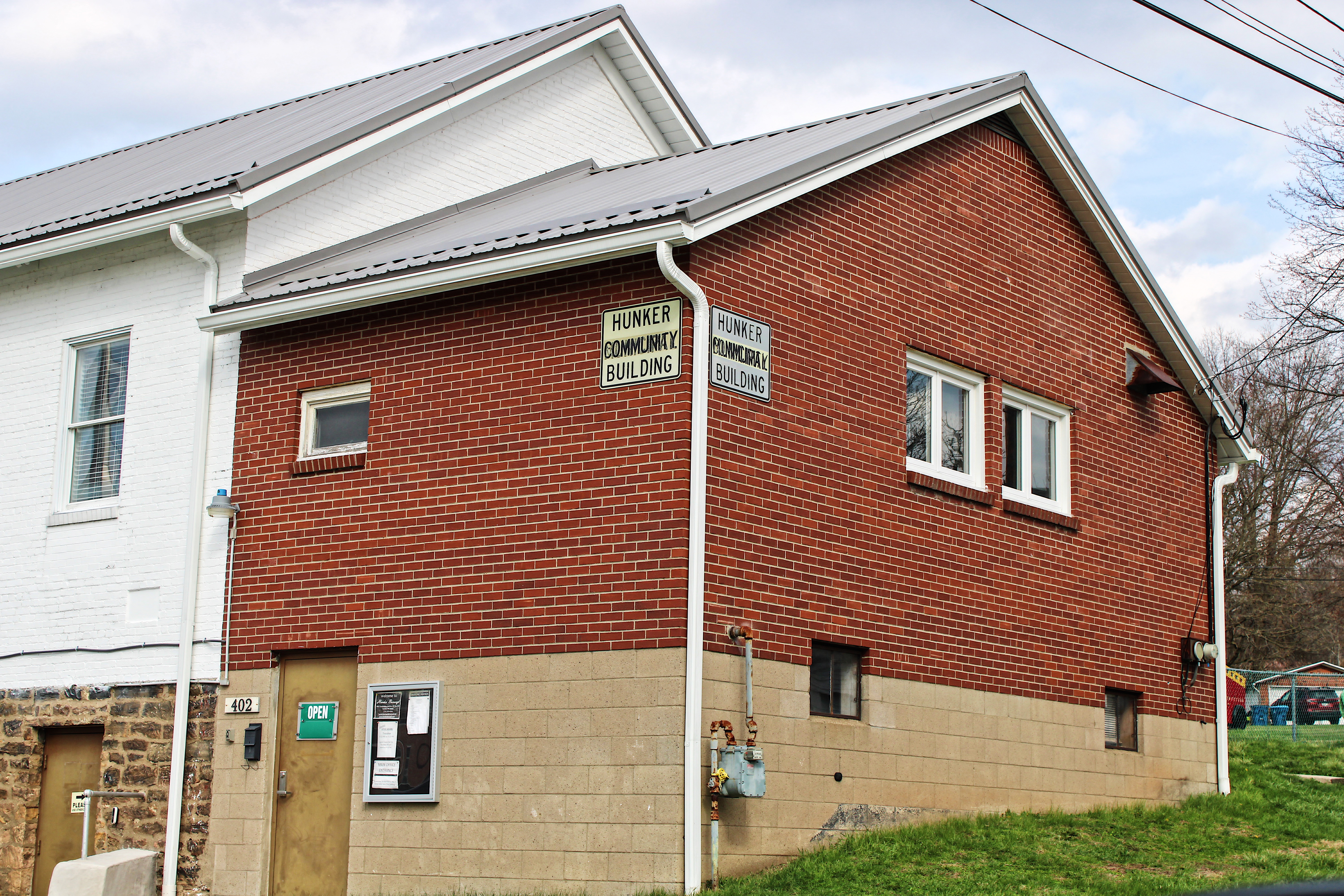
Hunker Community Center

At the time of the 2000 census, there were 329 people, 136 households, and 102 families living in the borough.

The population density was 886.8 inhabitants per square mile (342.4/km^{2}). There were 138 housing units at an average density of 372.0 per square mile (143.6/km^{2}).

The racial makeup of the borough was 96.35% White, 0.61% African American, 0.30% Native American, 0.91% Asian, and 1.82% from two or more races.

Of the 136 households, 25.0% had children under the age of eighteen living with them; 67.6% were married couples living together, 6.6% had a female householder with no husband present, and 24.3% were non-families. 21.3% of households were one person households and 11.8% were households with one person who was aged sixty-five or older.

The average household size was 2.42 and the average family size was 2.83.

The age distribution was 17.0% who were under the age of eighteen, 6.4% aged eighteen to twenty-four, 28.0% aged twenty-five to forty-four, 33.4% aged forty-five to sixty-four, and 15.2% who were sixty-five years of age or older. The median age was forty-four years.

For every one hundred females, there were 101.8 males. For every 100 females who were aged eighteen or older, there were 100.7 males.

The median household income was $40,313 and the median family income was $43,750. Males had a median income of $32,396 compared with that of $15,833 for females.

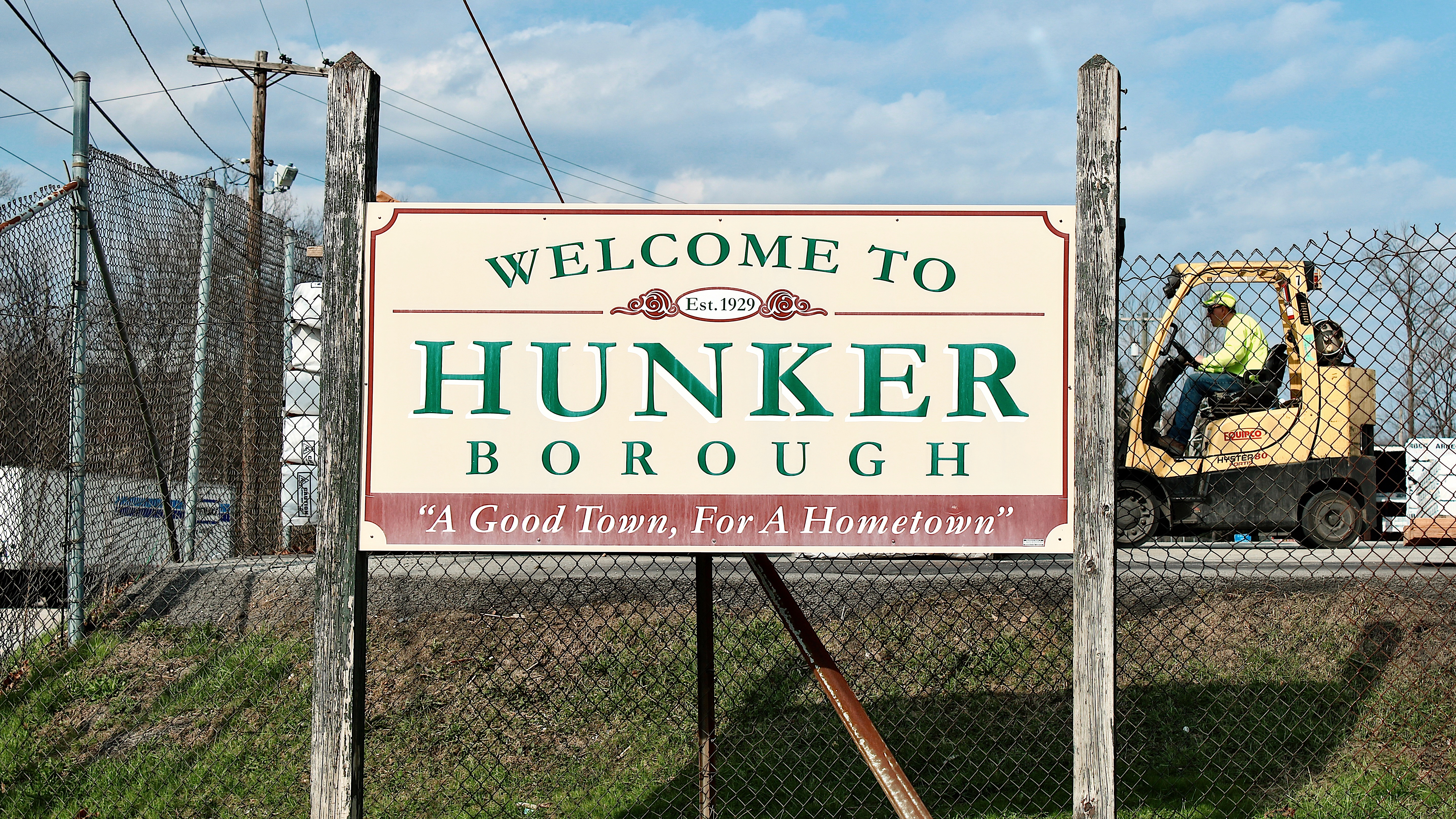
Hunker welcome sign

The per capita income for the borough was $22,045.

Roughly 7.6% of families and 6.1% of the population were living below the poverty line, including 7.0% of those who were under the age of eighteen and 12.5% of those who were aged sixty-five or older.

== Notable people ==
- Bob Garber, baseball player
- Sarah Kozer, reality TV star
