= Connellsville Coalfield =

Coordinates: 40°00′N 79°35′W

The Connellsville Coalfield is located in Fayette County and Westmoreland County, Pennsylvania, between the city of Latrobe and the small borough of Smithfield. It is sometimes known as the Connellsville Coke Field. This is because the section of the Pittsburgh coal seam here was famous as one of the finest metallurgical coals in the world. It is locally known as the Connellsville coal seam, but is a portion of the Pittsburgh seam.

Coal was mined in this field from the early 19th century. Actual coking of the coal was first tried near Connellsville in the 1840s. After the Civil War a beehive coke industry gained a foothold in the region. The heyday of the Connellsville Coalfield was from the 1880s to the 1920s. At least 60 coal towns, known as "coal patches", were constructed in the field. H. C. Frick Coal and Coke, a subsidiary of U.S. Steel after 1903, was the major player. Other notable industrialists included Josiah Van Kirk Thompson, W. J. Rainey, and Philip Cochran.

In an event known as the Morewood massacre in the early morning of April 2, 1891, local law enforcement shot into a crowd of striking United Mine Workers miners from the Morewood Coke Works, near Mount Pleasant, Pennsylvania. Seven miners died on the scene, and three more later died from their injuries.

The coalfield endured a long decline in the beehive coke industry and a gradual exhaustion of the coal reserves. Mining activity is minimal now, and only relegated to the occasional strip mine.

List of coal patches in the Connellsville Coalfield:

- Acme
- Alice
- Atlantic
- Baggaley
- Bessemer
- Bitner
- Bradenville
- Broadford
- Brinkertown
- Brownfield
- Bute
- Calumet
- Carpentertown
- Central
- Collier
- Continental No. 1
- Davidson
- Donnelley
- Dorothy
- Eagle
- Elk Grove
- Fairchance
- Ferguson
- Foxtown
- Hecla (Southwest)
- Hill Farm
- Hostetter
- Humpreys
- Junianta
- Leisenring
- Leith
- Lemont Furnace
- Mahoning
- Mahoney
- Mammoth
- Marguerite
- Mayfield
- McClure
- Monarch
- Monastery
- Morewood
- Mount Braddock
- Mutual
- Nellie
- Newcomer
- Oliphant
- Oliver No. 1, No. 2, No. 3
- Outcrop
- Owensdale (Summit)
- Pennsville
- Pleasant Unity (Jamison No. 20)
- Red Shaft
- Revere
- Saint Vincent Shaft
- Shoaf
- Sitka
- Standard
- Standard Shaft
- Summit (Owensdale)
- Superior
- Trauger
- Trotter
- Uledi
- United
- Valley Works
- West Latrobe
- West Leisenring
- Wheeler
- Whitney
- Wynn
- York Run
- Youngstown

== See also ==
- Coalfield
- Connellsville, Pennsylvania
