= List of Pennsylvania state historical markers in Westmoreland County =

Location of Westmoreland County in Pennsylvania

This is a list of the Pennsylvania state historical markers in Westmoreland County.

This is intended to be a complete list of the official state historical markers placed in Westmoreland County, Pennsylvania by the Pennsylvania Historical and Museum Commission (PHMC). The locations of the historical markers, as well as the latitude and longitude coordinates as provided by the PHMC's database, are included below when available. There are 46 historical markers located in Westmoreland County.

== Historical markers ==
Marker title	Image	Date dedicated	Location	Marker type	Topics
Arthur St. Clair		December 10, 1946	U.S. 30, 6.5 miles NW of Ligonier; 40.2854°N 79.3209°W	Roadside	American Revolution, Government & Politics, Government & Politics 18th Century, Military
Arthur St. Clair (1737-1818)		October 28, 1995	St. Clair Park, N. Main St. near E Otterman St., Greensburg	Roadside	American Revolution, Ethnic & Immigration, Government & Politics, Government & Politics 18th Century, Military
Banana Split, The		August 23, 2013	805 Ligonier St., Latrobe; 40.31666°N 79.38534°W	Roadside	Entrepreneurs, Invention
Brush Creek Salems Church		May 26, 1952	U.S. 30 near Adamsburg, near Bush Run Markers (Missing)	Roadside	Religion
Bullet's Defeat		June 10, 2003	Old Forbes Road, SR1010 50, Ligonier	Roadside	Forts, French & Indian War, Military
Bushy Run		December 10, 1946	U.S. 30 at Lowry Ave., S end of Jeanette; 40.31087°N 79.61892°W	Roadside	Early Settlement, Forts, French & Indian War, Military, Native American, Transportation
Bushy Run		December 10, 1946	Pa. 66 at Pittsburgh St. (old U.S. 22), Delmont; 40.41412°N 79.57252°W	Roadside	Early Settlement, Forts, French & Indian War, Military, Native American
Bushy Run Battlefield		September 14, 1964	At site, Pa. 993, 1 mile E of Harrison City; 40.35577°N 79.6256°W	Roadside	Forts, French & Indian War, Military, Native American
Christian B. Anfinsen (1916-1995)		October 1, 1999	3rd & Donner Avenues, Monessen	City	Education, Invention, Medicine & Science, Professions & Vocations
Colonel Edward Cook		October 29, 1994	Intersection near Rehoboth Church	Roadside	Early Settlement, Government & Politics, Government & Politics 18th Century, Military, Professions & Vocations, Whiskey Rebellion
Dagworthy's Camp		July 17, 1946	U.S. 30, 8.3 miles E of Greensburg (Missing)	Roadside	Forts, French & Indian War, Medicine & Science, Military
Darr Mine Disaster		September 14, 1994	Olive Branch Cemetery, Pa. 981 between Pa. 51 and Smithton; 40.15452°N 79.75562°W	Roadside	Business & Industry, Coal, Ethnic & Immigration, Labor
Eddie Adams (1933-2004)		May 29, 2016	Ninth St & Fourth Ave., New Kensington; 40.56503°N 79.76649°W	Roadside	Artists, Military Post-Civil War, Professions & Vocations, Publishing & Journalism
Fairview Park		August 19, 2017	Pittsburgh St./Old Wm. Penn Hwy. near Turner Ln., Delmont; 40.40614°N 79.55154°W	Roadside	African American, Religion, Sports & Recreation
Fanny Sellins		September 3, 1989	Front of Union Cemetery, Pa. 366, Arnold; 40.5821°N 79.75783°W	Roadside	Labor, Women
Forbes Road		July 13, 1960	U.S. 22, 1.2 miles E of Murrysville (Missing)	Roadside	French & Indian War, George Washington, Military, Roads
Forbes Road		November 11, 1967	Murrysville	Roadside	French & Indian War, George Washington, Military, Roads
Forbes Road		n/a	U.S. 22, 1.2 miles E of Murrysville; 40.42308°N 79.66362°W	Roadside	French & Indian War, George Washington, Military, Roads
Forbes Road, 1758, Fort Bedford to Fort Duquesne - 12 Mile Run Encampment (PLAQUE)		1930	Rt. 30 next to Latrobe Airport runway (?)	Plaque	French & Indian War, Military, Roads
Forbes Road, 1758, Fort Bedford to Fort Duquesne - Fort Ligonier (PLAQUE)		1930	301 E Main St., half block from public sq., Ligonier	Plaque	Forts, French & Indian War, Military, Roads
Forbes Road, 1758, Fort Bedford to Fort Duquesne - Turtle Creek Defile (PLAQUE)		1930	Rt. 22 at Priority Ln., at Post Office, Murrysville	Plaque	French & Indian War, George Washington, Military, Roads
Fort Allen		December 10, 1946	Pa. 136 at SR 3097, Hempfield Twp, SW of Greensburg; 40.28348°N 79.5924°W	Roadside	American Revolution, Early Settlement, Ethnic & Immigration, Forts, Military, Native American
Fort Allen - PLAQUE		May 1, 1929	At church, SR 3097 & St. Johns Church Rd., .5 mile S of PA 136 SW of Greensburg; 40.27905°N 79.59163°W	Plaque	American Revolution, Forts, Dunmore's War, Military
Fort Ligonier		December 10, 1946	Main & Market Sts., Ligonier; 40.24123°N 79.23505°W	Roadside	Forts, French & Indian War, Military, Native American
Fred McFeely Rogers (1928-2003)		June 11, 2016	James H. Rogers Park at Main & Jefferson Sts., Latrobe; 40.31601°N 79.38547°W	Roadside	Television, Popular Culture, Celebrity
Hannastown		December 6, 1946	U.S. 119 at SR 1032 (Forbes Rd.) N of Greensburg (Missing)	Roadside	American Revolution, Government & Politics, Government & Politics 18th Century, Native American
Henry Clay Frick		December 10, 1946	Pa. 819 at SR 3089 (old U.S. 119) N end of Scottdale	Roadside	Business & Industry, Coal, Professions & Vocations, Steel
Idlewild Park		October 6, 2012	Rt. 30E, at park exit gate, Ligonier Twp. 40.26378°N 79.27981°W	Roadside	Business & Industry, Railroads, Sports & Recreation
John W. Geary		August 23, 1951	S. Diamond St. & Union Alley, Mount Pleasant Veterans Park	Roadside	Civil War, Government & Politics, Government & Politics 19th Century, Governors, Military
Johnston House		December 10, 1946	U.S. 30, 7 miles NW of Ligonier	Roadside	Buildings, Government & Politics, Government & Politics 19th Century, Governors, Houses & Homesteads
Loyalhanning		December 10, 1946	U.S. 30 just SE of Ligonier; 40.23707°N 79.23042°W	Roadside	Early Settlement, Native American
Mammoth Mine Explosion		September 29, 2000	St. John's Cemetery, along Rt. 819, Scottdale; 40.09303°N 79.6024°W	Roadside	Business & Industry, Labor
Morewood Massacre		September 29, 2000	Rt. 119 overpass on Rt. 981 (Moorewood Rd.), E Huntington Twp.	Roadside	Business & Industry, Labor
Murrysville Gas Well		July 13, 1960	US 22, between Trafford Rd. and Reed Blvd., Murrysville; 40.42702°N 79.69762°W	Roadside	Business & Industry, Oil & Gas
Norvelt		September 8, 2002	Mt. Pleasant Road (LR 6406), on V.F.D. property, Norvelt; 40.20942°N 79.4974°W	Roadside	Business & Industry, Government & Politics, Government & Politics 20th Century, Labor
Rural Free Delivery		June 26, 2001	135 West Pennsylvania Ave., New Stanton; 40.216°N 79.6099°W	Roadside	Government & Politics 19th Century, Government & Politics 20th Century, Transportation
Sisters of Charity of Seton Hill		Aug 28, 2021	At entrance to Seton Hill University 40.304884°N 79.551726°W	Roadside	Religion, Women
Saint Vincent		December 10, 1946 (missing) September 10, 2014	At College entrance on Fraser Purchase Rd. 40.2927°N 79.4009°W	Roadside	Education, Religion
St. Xavier's		December 10, 1946	US 30 at St. Xavier's Rd., 6 miles E of Greensburg at Academy; 40.28263°N 79.41637°W	Roadside	Education, Ethnic & Immigration, Religion, Women
Standard Shaft Mine & Coke Works		April 14, 2007	Along State St. (SR 2007), Mt. Pleasant Twp.	Roadside	Business & Industry, Coal, Ethnic & Immigration
Stephanie Kwolek (1923-2014)		October 1, 2016	734 7th St., New Kensington; 40.56256°N 79.76159°W	Roadside	Science & Medicine, Military, Police and Safety, Professions & Vocations, Women
Toll House		May 28, 1955	E. Pittsburgh St., east of Stark St., Greensburg; 40.3028°N 78.4696°W	City	Roads, Transportation
Toll House		May 28, 1955	Mount Odin Park, Tollgate Hill Rd. (Bus. Rt. 30), Greensburg; 40.3062°N 78.4306°W	City	Roads, Transportation
Twelve Mile Camp		December 10, 1946	Junction U.S. 30 & Pa. 981, 7.1 miles E of Greensburg	Roadside	French & Indian War, George Washington, Military
Vandergrift		May 17, 1990	Municipal Bldg. E lawn, Washington Ave. Near Custer Ave. (Rt. 56), Vandergrift; 40.60407°N 79.56483°W	City	Business & Industry, Cities & Towns
West Newton		December 10, 1946	W Main St. (PA 136) at Youghiogheny River bridge, West Newton; 40.21138°N 79.77033°W	Roadside	Government & Politics, Government & Politics 18th Century
Westmoreland County		November 25, 1981	NE corner, Courthouse Square, Main & Otterman Sts., Greensburg; 40.303°N 78.4555°W	City	Government & Politics, Government & Politics 18th Century
William Findley		October 28, 1994	Route 981 near Route 30, Latrobe	Roadside	Government & Politics, Government & Politics 18th Century, Whiskey Rebellion
Willie Thrower (1930-2002)		October 24, 2003	Valley High School, 703 Stevenson Blvd., New Kensington; 40.5656°N 79.75495°W	Roadside	African American, Football, Sports

== See also ==
- List of Pennsylvania state historical markers
- National Register of Historic Places listings in Westmoreland County, Pennsylvania
