= List of places in Pennsylvania: U =

This list of cities, towns, unincorporated communities, counties, and other recognized places in the U.S. state of Pennsylvania also includes information on the number and names of counties in which the place lies, and its lower and upper zip code bounds, if applicable.

| Name of place | Number of counties | Principal county | Lower zip code | Upper zip code |
|---|---|---|---|---|
| Uhdey | 1 | Bradford County | | |
| Uhlerstown | 1 | Bucks County | 08825 | |
| Uledi | 1 | Fayette County | 15484 | |
| Ulhers | 1 | Northampton County | | |
| Ulster | 1 | Bradford County | 18850 | |
| Ulster Township | 1 | Bradford County | | |
| Ulysses | 1 | Potter County | 16948 | |
| Ulysses Township | 1 | Potter County | 16948 | |
| Unamis | 1 | Somerset County | | |
| Undercliff | 1 | Allegheny County | | |
| Unicorn | 1 | Lancaster County | 17566 | |
| Union | 1 | Lancaster County | 17560 | |
| Union | 1 | Lancaster County | 17536 | |
| Union Center | 1 | Tioga County | 17724 | |
| Union City | 1 | Erie County | 16438 | |
| Union Dale | 1 | Susquehanna County | 18470 | |
| Union Deposit | 1 | Dauphin County | 17033 | |
| Union Furnace | 1 | Huntingdon County | 16686 | |
| Union Grove | 1 | Lancaster County | 15719 | |
| Union Hill | 1 | Carbon County | 18235 | |
| Union Hill | 1 | Susquehanna County | | |
| Union Mills | 1 | Mifflin County | 17004 | |
| Union Square | 1 | Lancaster County | 17545 | |
| Union Township | 1 | Adams County | | |
| Union Township | 1 | Bedford County | | |
| Union Township | 1 | Berks County | | |
| Union Township | 1 | Centre County | | |
| Union Township | 1 | Clearfield County | | |
| Union Township | 1 | Crawford County | | |
| Union Township | 1 | Erie County | | |
| Union Township | 1 | Fulton County | | |
| Union Township | 1 | Huntingdon County | | |
| Union Township | 1 | Jefferson County | | |
| Union Township | 1 | Lawrence County | | |
| Union Township | 1 | Lebanon County | | |
| Union Township | 1 | Luzerne County | | |
| Union Township | 1 | Mifflin County | | |
| Union Township | 1 | Schuylkill County | | |
| Union Township | 1 | Snyder County | | |
| Union Township | 1 | Tioga County | | |
| Union Township | 1 | Union County | | |
| Union Township | 1 | Washington County | | |
| Union Trust | 1 | Allegheny County | 15219 | |
| Union Valley | 1 | Lawrence County | | |
| Union Water Works | 1 | Lebanon County | 17003 | |
| Union Dale | 1 | Susquehanna County | 18470 | |
| Uniontown | 1 | Dauphin County | | |
| Uniontown | 1 | Fayette County | 15401 | |
| Uniontown | 1 | Indiana County | 15724 | |
| Uniontown | 1 | Northumberland County | | |
| Uniontown | 1 | Venango County | | |
| Uniontown | 1 | York County | 17019 | |
| Uniontown Heights | 1 | Venango County | 16320 | |
| Uniontown North | 1 | Fayette County | 15401 | |
| Unionville | 1 | Beaver County | 15074 | |
| Unionville | 1 | Berks County | 19518 | |
| Unionville | 2 | Bucks County | 19440 | |
| Unionville | 2 | Montgomery County | 19440 | |
| Unionville | 1 | Butler County | 16001 | |
| Unionville | 1 | Carbon County | | |
| Unionville | 1 | Centre County | 16835 | |
| Unionville | 1 | Chester County | 19375 | |
| United | 1 | Westmoreland County | 15689 | |
| Unity | 1 | Allegheny County | 15239 | |
| Unity House | 1 | Pike County | 18373 | |
| Unity Junction | 1 | Allegheny County | 15239 | |
| Unity Township | 1 | Westmoreland County | | |
| Unityville | 1 | Lycoming County | 17774 | |
| Universal | 1 | Allegheny County | 15235 | |
| University City | 1 | Philadelphia County | 19104 | |
| University Heights | 1 | Northampton County | 18015 | |
| University Park | 1 | Centre County | 16802 | |
| Uno | 1 | York County | | |
| Upland | 1 | Chester County | | |
| Upland | 1 | Delaware County | 19015 | |
| Upland Park | 1 | Delaware County | 19083 | |
| Upland Terrace | 1 | Montgomery County | 19004 | |
| Upper Allen Township | 1 | Cumberland County | | |
| Upper Augusta Township | 1 | Northumberland County | | |
| Upper Bern Township | 1 | Berks County | | |
| Upper Black Eddy | 1 | Bucks County | 18972 | |
| Upper Brownville | 1 | Schuylkill County | | |
| Upper Burrell Township | 1 | Westmoreland County | | |
| Upper Chichester Township | 1 | Delaware County | | |
| Upper Darby | 1 | Delaware County | 19082 | 84 |
| Upper Darby Township | 1 | Delaware County | | |
| Upper Delaware Scenic and Recreational River | 2 | Pike County | 12726 | |
| Upper Delaware Scenic and Recreational River | 2 | Wayne County | 12726 | |
| Upper Dublin Township | 1 | Montgomery County | | |
| Upper Dutchtown | 1 | Cambria County | | |
| Upper Emilie | 1 | Bucks County | | |
| Upper Exeter | 1 | Luzerne County | 18643 | |
| Upper Fairfield Township | 1 | Lycoming County | | |
| Upper Frankford Township | 1 | Cumberland County | 17241 | |
| Upper Frederick Township | 1 | Montgomery County | | |
| Upper Glasgow | 1 | Montgomery County | 19464 | |
| Upper Gwynedd Township | 1 | Montgomery County | | |
| Upper Hanover Township | 1 | Montgomery County | | |
| Upper Hillville | 1 | Clarion County | | |
| Upper Lawn | 1 | Lebanon County | 17078 | |
| Upper Leacock Township | 1 | Lancaster County | | |
| Upper Lehigh | 1 | Luzerne County | 18224 | |
| Upper Lehigh Junction | 1 | Luzerne County | 18661 | |
| Upper Macungie Township | 1 | Lehigh County | | |
| Upper Mahanoy Township | 1 | Northumberland County | | |
| Upper Mahantongo Township | 1 | Schuylkill County | | |
| Upper Makefield Township | 1 | Bucks County | | |
| Upper Merion | 1 | Montgomery County | | |
| Upper Merion Township | 1 | Montgomery County | | |
| Upper Middletown | 1 | Fayette County | 15480 | |
| Upper Mifflin Township | 1 | Cumberland County | 17241 | |
| Upper Milford Township | 1 | Lehigh County | | |
| Upper Mill | 1 | Cumberland County | 17065 | |
| Upper Moreland Township | 1 | Montgomery County | | |
| Upper Mount Bethel Township | 1 | Northampton County | | |
| Upper Nazareth Township | 1 | Northampton County | | |
| Upper Octoraro | 1 | Chester County | | |
| Upper Orchard | 1 | Bucks County | 19058 | |
| Upper Oxford Township | 1 | Chester County | | |
| Upper Paxton Township | 1 | Dauphin County | | |
| Upper Peanut | 1 | Fayette County | 15480 | |
| Upper Pittston | 1 | Luzerne County | | |
| Upper Pottsgrove Township | 1 | Montgomery County | | |
| Upper Providence Township | 1 | Delaware County | | |
| Upper Providence Township | 1 | Montgomery County | | |
| Upper Reese | 1 | Blair County | 16648 | |
| Upper Sagon | 1 | Northumberland County | 17877 | |
| Upper St. Clair | 1 | Allegheny County | 15241 | |
| Upper St. Clair Township | 1 | Allegheny County | | |
| Upper Salford Township | 1 | Montgomery County | | |
| Upper Saucon Township | 1 | Lehigh County | | |
| Upper Southampton Township | 1 | Bucks County | | |
| Upper Strasburg | 1 | Franklin County | 17265 | |
| Upper Tulpehocken Township | 1 | Berks County | | |
| Upper Turkeyfoot Township | 1 | Somerset County | | |
| Upper Two Lick | 1 | Indiana County | | |
| Upper Tyrone Township | 1 | Fayette County | | |
| Upper Uwchlan Township | 1 | Chester County | | |
| Upper Whyel | 1 | Westmoreland County | | |
| Upper Yoder Township | 1 | Cambria County | | |
| Upsal | 1 | Philadelphia County | | |
| Upsonville | 1 | Susquehanna County | | |
| Upton | 1 | Franklin County | 17225 | |
| Uptown | 1 | Allegheny County | 15219 | |
| Urban | 1 | Northumberland County | 17830 | |
| Urey | 1 | Indiana County | 15742 | |
| Uriah | 1 | Cumberland County | 17324 | |
| Ursina | 1 | Somerset County | 15485 | |
| Ursina Junction | 1 | Somerset County | 15424 | |
| US Naval Base | 1 | Philadelphia County | 19112 | |
| Uswick | 1 | Wayne County | 18428 | |
| Utahville | 1 | Clearfield County | 16627 | |
| Utica | 1 | Venango County | 16362 | |
| Uwchlan Township | 1 | Chester County | | |
| Uwchland | 1 | Chester County | 19480 | |
