= Bob Gorinski =

American baseball player (born 1952)

- Designated hitter / Outfield
- Born: January 7, 1952 (age 74); Latrobe, Pennsylvania, U.S.
- Batted: Right Threw: Right

MLB debut
- April 10, 1977, for the Minnesota Twins

Last MLB appearance
- October 1, 1977, for the Minnesota Twins

MLB statistics
- Batting average: .195
- Hits: 23
- Runs: 14
- Home runs: 3
- Runs batted in: 22
- On-base plus slugging: .548
- Stats at Baseball Reference

Teams
- Minnesota Twins (1977)

Robert John Gorinski (born January 7, 1952) is an American former Major League Baseball outfielder and designated hitter. He played one season (1977) for the Minnesota Twins, with a .195 batting average.

Gorinski is a native of Calumet, Pennsylvania and a graduate of Mount Pleasant Area High School in 1970. Gorinski was selected by the Minnesota Twins in the 1st round (22nd pick overall) of the 1970 Major League Baseball draft. He made his Major League Baseball debut on April 10, 1977 for the Minnesota Twins.

== Minor leagues ==
Gorinski began his professional career in the Gulf Coast League in 1970. That season, while playing with the Sarasota Twins, he led the league with 6 home runs. By 1972, Gorinski advanced to playing Single-A baseball in the Carolina League with the Twins' affiliate in Lynchburg. There he led the league with 23 home runs. The following year in 1974, he led the Southern League, while with the Orlando Twins, with 23 home runs and 100 RBIs. In 1976, he led the Pacific Coast League with 28 home runs and 110 RBIs, while with the Tacoma Twins.

== Major Leagues ==
In the 35th annual Baseball Hall of Fame Game, Minnesota scored three runs late for an 8-5 win over the Philadelphia Phillies. Gorinski belted a three-run home run in the top of the sixth inning to even the game at 5-5. Gorinski also collected a fourth-inning RBI double His jersey number was 35 during his time with the Twins.

== Family ==
Bob is the nephew of Walt Gorinski, a professional football player who played in 1946 with the Pittsburgh Steelers of the National Football League.

== Stats ==
=== Batting stats ===
Year	Team	G	AB	R	H	HR	RBI	AVG	OBP	SLG	2B	3B	BB	SO	HBP	SH	SB	IBB	GDP
1977	MIN	54	118	14	23	3	22	.195	.226	.322	4	1	5	29	0	2	1	0	1
