= Joe Cibulas =

American football player (1921–1998)

No. 78
- Position: Tackle

Personal information
- Born: May 31, 1921; Whitney, Pennsylvania, U.S.
- Died: May 15, 1998 (aged 76); Pittsburgh, Pennsylvania, U.S.
- Listed height: 6 ft 0 in (1.83 m)
- Listed weight: 220 lb (100 kg)

Career information
- College: Duquesne
- NFL draft: 1943: 25th round, 237th overall pick

Career history
- Pittsburgh Steelers (1945)

Awards and highlights
- Duquesne University Hall of Fame (1974)

Career NFL statistics
- Games played: 5
- Stats at Pro Football Reference

Joseph James Cibulas (May 31, 1921 – May 15, 1998) was an American professional football offensive tackle in the National Football League (NFL). He played for the Pittsburgh Steelers during the 1945 season. Cibulas was born near Norvelt, Pennsylvania, located between Greensburg and Latrobe.

He attended Hurst High School located in Norvelt, and later Duquesne University. Many sources mistakenly state that Cibulas attended Mount Pleasant Area High School, located in Mount Pleasant, Pennsylvania. However that school was not open until 1960 well after Cibulas' graduation in 1943.

== NFL ==
Cibulas was drafted by the Steelers in the 25th round (237th overall) of the 1943 draft. The Pittsburgh Steelers and the Philadelphia Eagles merged their teams during the 1943 season and became the Philadelphia-Pittsburgh "Steagles". That year the Steelers and the Eagles merged their teams during the 1943 season and became the Philadelphia-Pittsburgh "Steagles". The merger was a result of manning shortages due to World War II. Cibulas did not play with the merged teams. He played only one season with the Steelers in 1945.

== College ==
He was inducted into the Duquesne University Sports Hall of Fame in 1974.
