= Fort Allen =

Fort Allen may refer to:

Military bases:

- Fort Allen (Carbon County, Pennsylvania), a French and Indian War fort built by Benjamin Franklin in what is now Weissport
- Fort Allen (Westmoreland County, Pennsylvania), an American Revolution-era fort outside of Pittsburgh
- Fort Allen, an American Civil War fort involved in the Battle of New Haven in Nelson County, Kentucky
- Fort Allen (Maine), a former fort in Munjoy Hill, Portland
- Fort Allen (Puerto Rico), an active Puerto Rico National Guard military base

Other uses:

- Fort Allen Park, a public park on the site of the former fort in Portland, Maine
- Fort Allen Elementary School, a primary school in Hempfield Area School District, western Pennsylvania
