= Trauger =

Trauger may refer to:

- Trauger, Pennsylvania, a community in Westmoreland, Pennsylvania
- 5968 Trauger, an asteroid
- Aleta Arthur Trauger, a United States federal judge
