= 15693 =

15693 may refer to:

- ISO/IEC 15693, ISO/IEC standard for contactless vicinity objects
- (15693) 1984 SN6, minor planet
- 15693, ZIP code for Whitney, Pennsylvania, U.S.
