= Paul Chervinko =

American baseball player (1910-1976)

- Catcher
- Born: July 23, 1910; Trauger, Pennsylvania, U.S.
- Died: June 3, 1976 (aged 65); Danville, Illinois, U.S.
- Batted: Right Threw: Right

MLB debut
- May 30, 1937, for the Brooklyn Dodgers

Last MLB appearance
- July 9, 1938, for the Brooklyn Dodgers

MLB statistics
- Batting average: .147
- Home runs: 0
- Runs batted in: 5
- Stats at Baseball Reference

Teams
- Brooklyn Dodgers (1937–1938)

Paul Chervinko (July 23, 1910 – June 3, 1976) was an American Major League Baseball catcher for parts of two seasons with the Brooklyn Dodgers (1937–1938). He was a native of Trauger, Pennsylvania.

Chervinko was an excellent defensive player who just couldn't hit well enough to stay in the big leagues. Behind the plate he made only one error in 102 chances for a fielding percentage of .990. At bat, however, he was just 11-for-75 (.147) with five runs batted in and one run scored in 42 total games.

During his time with Brooklyn he was surrounded by some quite notable people. His manager was Hall of Famer Burleigh Grimes, and some of his teammates were future Hall of Famers as well: outfielder Heinie Manush, pitcher Waite Hoyt, and shortstop Leo Durocher. Also on the team was All-Star infielder Cookie Lavagetto, who would later gain fame in the 1947 World Series.

Chervinko died in Danville, Illinois at the age of 65.
