= Calumet-Norvelt, Pennsylvania =

Calumet-Norvelt
- Unincorporated community
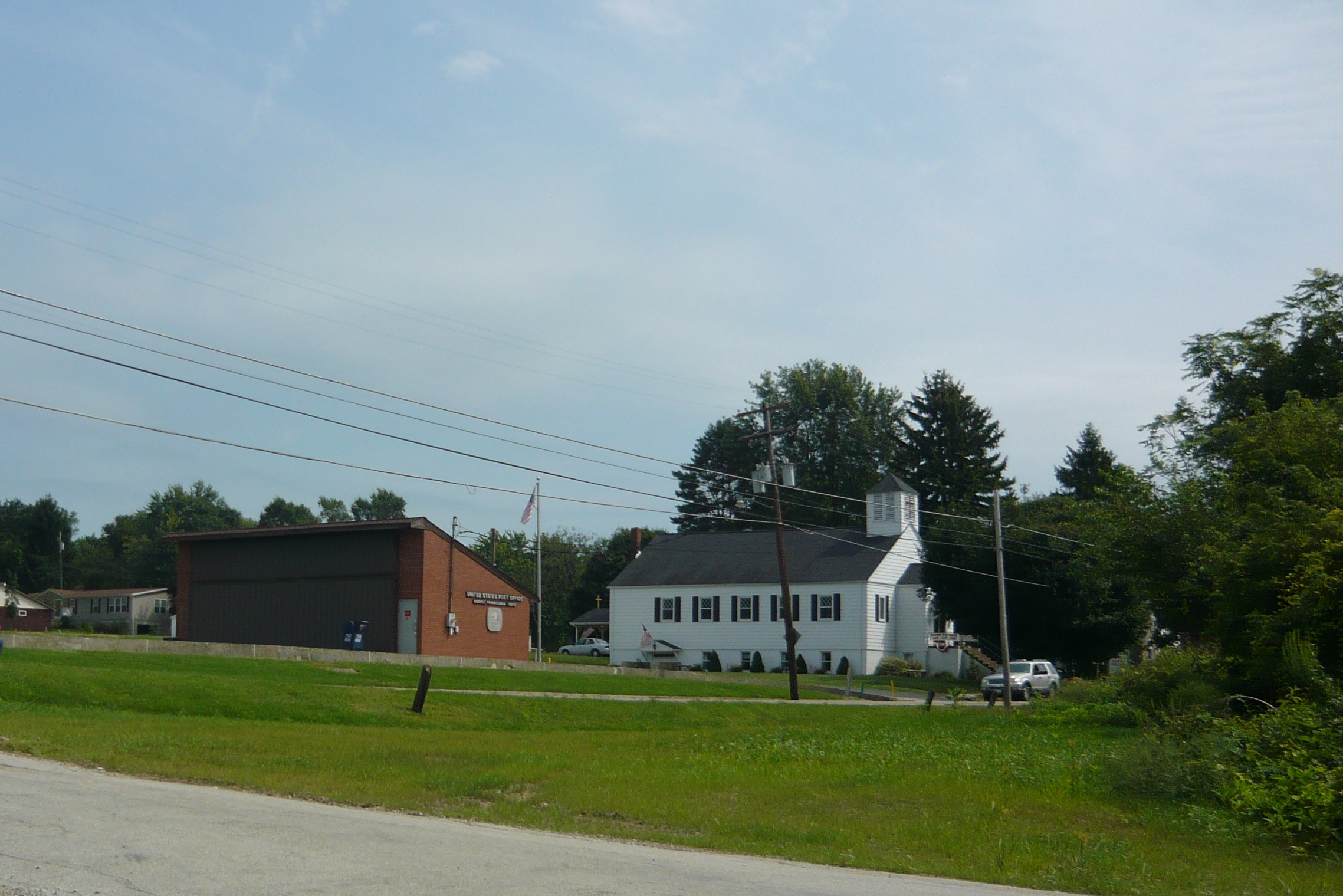
- Norvelt Post Office and Norvelt Union Church; Mount Pleasant Road
- Etymology: Calumet Coke Company (Calumet) and Eleanor Roosevelt (Norvelt)
- Location of Calumet-Norvelt in Pennsylvania Calumet-Norvelt (the United States)
- Coordinates: 40°12′49″N 79°29′35″W
- Country: United States
- State: Pennsylvania
- County: Westmoreland
- Township: Mount Pleasant
- Founded: 1888 (Calumet) and 1934 (Norvelt)

Area
  - Total: 1.5 sq mi (3.9 km^{2})
  - Land: 1.5 sq mi (3.9 km^{2})
  - Water: 0.0 sq mi (0 km^{2})
- Elevation: 1,000 ft (300 m)

Population (2000)
  - Total: 1,682
  - Density: 1,100/sq mi (430/km^{2})
- Time zone: UTC-5 (EST)
  - Summer (DST): UTC-4 (EDT)
- ZIP code: 15621 (Calumet) and 15674 (Norvelt)
- Area code: 724

Calumet-Norvelt was a census-designated place (CDP) in Westmoreland County, Pennsylvania, United States. The community was divided into the two separate communities of Calumet and Norvelt for the 2010 census. Although the US Census treats Calumet and Norvelt as a single community, they are in reality two very different communities, each reflecting a different chapter in how the Great Depression affected rural Pennsylvanians. Calumet was a typical "patch town", built by a single company to house its miners as cheaply as possible. The closing of the Calumet mine during the Great Depression caused enormous hardship in an era when unemployment compensation and welfare payments were non-existent. On the other hand, Norvelt was created during the depression by the US federal government as a model community, intended to increase the standard of living of laid-off coal miners.

== Geography ==
Calumet-Norvelt is an unincorporated community within Mount Pleasant Township. Calumet-Norvelt is located at 40°12′49″N 79°29′35″W (40.213730, -79.493121). According to the United States Census Bureau, the CDP has a total area of 1.5 square miles (3.9 km^{2}), all of it land.

== History of Calumet ==
Calumet was founded by the Calumet Coke Company in 1888 as a housing site for its workers. The community, as originally laid out, consisted of twenty double-houses, twelve single-family houses, and a few commercial and industrial buildings. The workers were employed in a coal mine and also tended ovens that produced coke (fuel). In 1894, Calumet was the site of a bitter coal miners’ strike against the H. C. Frick Coke Company, which at that time was part-owner of Calumet Coke Company.

The coke works closed in the 1920s, and the mine closed in the early 1930s during the Great Depression, causing enormous hardship for the community's workers.

== History of Norvelt ==
Norvelt, originally named Westmoreland Homesteads, was created April 13, 1934, as one of a series of “subsistence homesteads” under the National Industrial Recovery Act. These communities were intended to allow rural inhabitants to have an improved quality of living, while largely growing their own food. It was hoped that these new communities would raise the standard of living for unemployed coal miners from nearby Calumet and similar "patch towns" in the area. Accordingly, each lot was a minimum of 1.7 acres (6,900 m^{2}), and other land was set aside as a cooperative farm. The community's layout and home designs were created by Paul Bartholomew, an architect who had also designed many notable buildings in Greensburg.

In 1937, the community's name was changed to Norvelt (EleaNOR RooseVELT), following a visit by Eleanor Roosevelt, wife of President Franklin D. Roosevelt.

== Demographics ==
At the 2000 census, there were 1,682 people, 682 households and 504 families residing in the CDP. The population density was 1,156.4 per square mile (446.5/km^{2}). There were 709 housing units at an average density of 487.5 per square mile (188.2/km^{2}). The racial make-up of the CDP was 99.41% White, 0.36% African American, 0.18% from other races and 0.06% from two or more races. Hispanic or Latino of any race were 0.48% of the population.

There were 682 households, of which 27.9% had children under the age of 18 living with them, 61.4% were married couples living together, 7.8% had a female householder with no husband present and 26.0% were non-families. 24.2% of all households were made up of individuals, and 15.2% had someone living alone who was 65 years of age or older. The average household size was 2.47 and the average family size was 2.92.

21.3% of the population were under the age of 18, 5.8% from 18 to 24, 26.5% from 25 to 44, 26.0% from 45 to 64 and 20.5% were 65 years of age or older. The median age was 43 years. For every 100 females, there were 97.2 males. For every 100 females age 18 and over, there were 94.4 males.

The median household income was $38,000 and the median family income was $47,292. Males had a median income of $29,966 and females $22,027. The per capita income as $17,043. About 4.2% of families and 4.9% of the population were below the poverty line, including 5.9% of those under age 18 and 5.6% of those age 65 or over.
