= Sewickley Manor =

- U.S. National Register of Historic Places
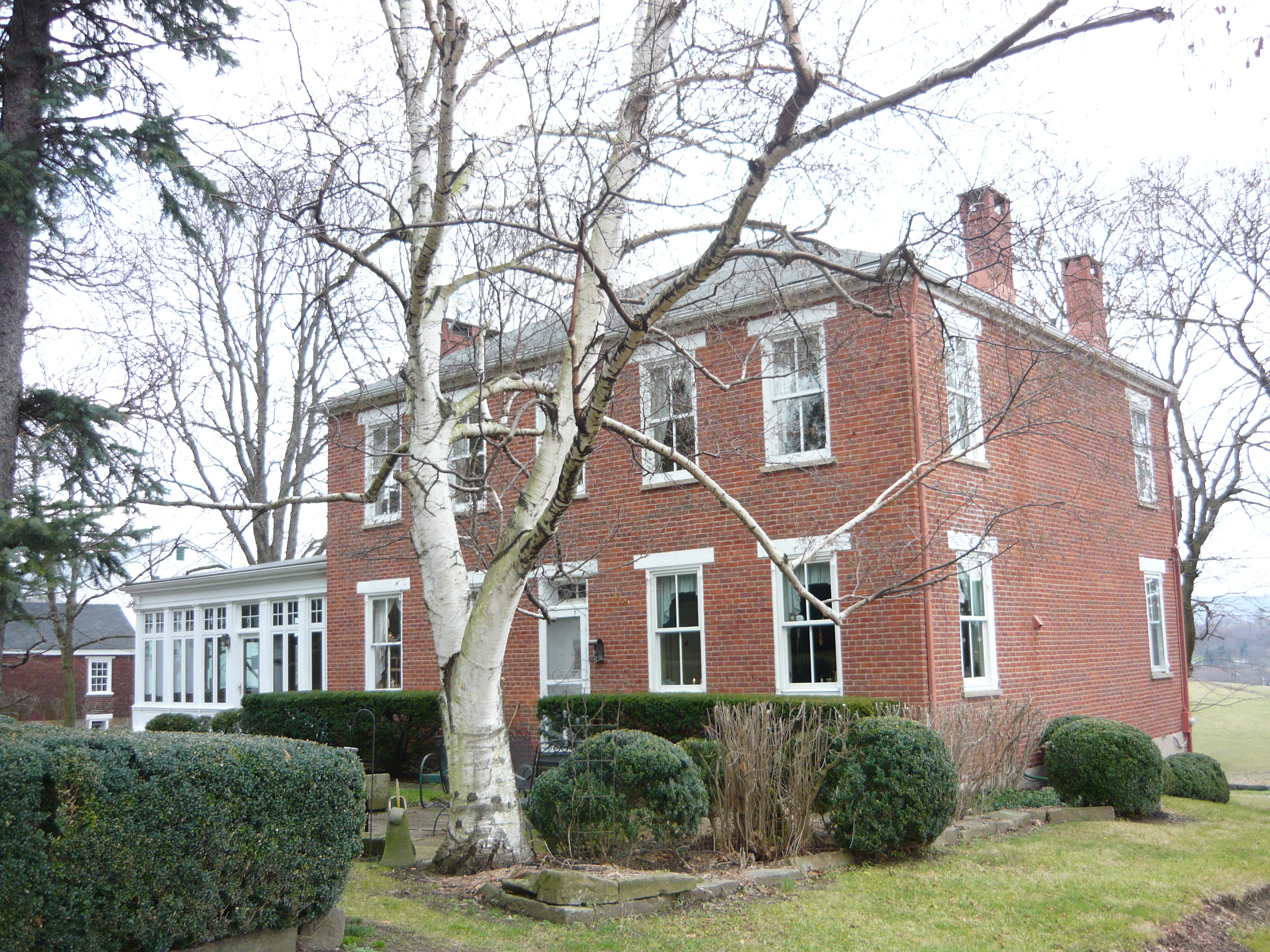
- Sewickley Manor, December 2011

- Location within Pennsylvania Location within the United States
- Interactive map showing the location of Sewickley Manor
- Location: Legislative Route 64136, north of Calumet, Mount Pleasant Township, Pennsylvania
- Coordinates: 40°19′47″N 79°44′21″W
- Area: 10 acres (4.0 ha)
- Built: 1852
- Built by: David S. Pollins
- Architectural style: Greek Revival
- NRHP reference No.: 82003820
- Added to NRHP: April 19, 1982

Sewickley Manor, also known as the Pollins Farmstead, is an historic home and farm complex that is located in Mount Pleasant Township, Westmoreland County, Pennsylvania, United States.

It was added to the National Register of Historic Places in 1983.

== History and architectural features ==
The house was designed in the Greek Revival style. Built circa 1852, it is a two-story, brick dwelling with a two-story frame addition.

The farmstead includes the following contributing outbuildings: a Smoke house (c. 1790s), a spring house (c. 1850s), a chicken coop (c. 1880s), a machinery shed (c. 1880s), a wagon shed (c. 1880s), an outbuilding (c. 1880s), a pig pen (c. 1880s), a barn (1849), a tenant house (built before 1900), and a sheep shed (c. 1880s).
