= Walt Gorinski =

American football player (1919–1977)

No. 20
- Position: Fullback

Personal information
- Born: December 20, 1919; Mutual, Pennsylvania, U.S.
- Died: July 3, 1977 (aged 57); Bossier City, Louisiana, U.S.
- Listed height: 6 ft 1 in (1.85 m)
- Listed weight: 207 lb (94 kg)

Career information
- College: LSU
- NFL draft: 1943: 17th round, 152nd overall pick

Career history
- Pittsburgh Steelers (1946)

Career NFL statistics
- Rushing yards: 3
- Rushing average: 3
- Stats at Pro Football Reference

Walter A. Gorinski (December 20, 1919 – July 3, 1977) was a professional football player in the National Football League (NFL) for the Pittsburgh Steelers. After attending Hurst High School, located in Norvelt, Pennsylvania, Gorinski attended and played college football at Louisiana State University. Gorinski made his professional debut in the NFL in 1946 with the Steelers. He played his entire 1-year career for Pittsburgh. He is the uncle of Bob Gorinski, a designated hitter with the Minnesota Twins in 1977.

Many sources state that Gorinski attended Mount Pleasant Area High School, located in Mount Pleasant, Pennsylvania. However, the school was not open until 1961 well after Gorinski's graduation in 1938.

== NFL ==
Gorinski was drafted by the Philadelphia Eagles in the 17th round (152nd overall) of the 1943 draft. That year the Steelers and the Eagles merged their teams during the 1943 season and became the Philadelphia-Pittsburgh "Steagles". The merger was dissolved after the 1943 season, as it was not intended to be permanent. The Eagles, received enough players back from the war and resumed their traditional operation. Gorinski did not play with the merged teams he played only one season with the Steelers in 1946.

== College ==
On November 29, 1941, with Gorinski in at fullback, the LSU Tigers defeated Tulane 19-0 in New Orleans. This victory resulted in the Tiger Rag being awarded to LSU. In 1942, Gorinski was awarded LSU's Percy E. Roberts MVP Award, which is presented to the athletes selected as the most valuable offensive and defensive players.
