= Mammoth Mine disaster =

1891 coal mine explosion in Pennsylvania

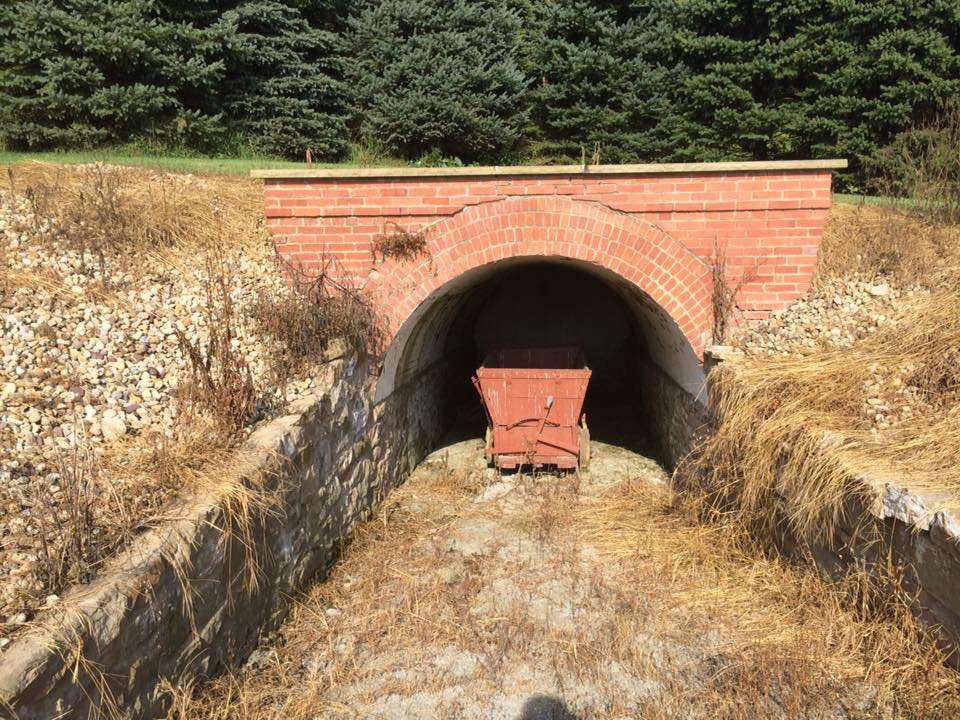
- Mine entrance, now blocked
- Date: January 27, 1891
- Time: 9:00 AM
- Location: Westmoreland County, Pennsylvania; 40.20054825670539°N 79.46722525752307°W
- Cause: Gas explosion
- Deaths: 109

The Mammoth Mine disaster or Frick Mine explosion occurred on January 27, 1891 just after 9:00 AM in the Mammoth No. 1 mine in Mount Pleasant Township, Westmoreland County, Pennsylvania. Newspapers reported that firedamp was ignited by a miner's oil lamp, resulting in the deaths of 109 men and boys. Most of the miners were not killed by the force of the explosion, but rather were suffocated by the effects of afterdamp.

== The Mammoth mines ==
The Mammoth mining complex consisted of the Mammoth No. 1 Mine (a shaft mine) and the Mammoth No. 2 Mine (a slope mine). From approximately 1879 to 1889 the Mammoth No. 1 mine was owned by Colonel J.W. Moore Coke Company in Greensburg, PA. In 1889, the mine was purchased by The H. C. Frick Coke Company. The Frick Coke Company sold the mine in 1927.

== Events and aftermath ==
Accounts vary, but it is believed that either 107 or 109 coal miners, mostly Polish, Hungarian, and Italian immigrants, were killed on the morning of the explosion. Seventy-nine of the victims are buried in a mass grave at St. John the Baptist Cemetery in Scottdale, Pennsylvania. In the early 2000s, two Pennsylvania Historical & Museum Commission markers and a pair of personalized headstones were added to the site.

== Impact on workplace safety ==
The Mammoth mine incident prompted Pennsylvania state legislation to strengthen mine safety inspections. Thomas Lynch, President of H. C. Frick Coke Company, introduced the phrase “Safety is the first consideration” at the top of every company circular. Soon after, the expression “Safety First” began to appear on signs posted around the mines. Also soon after the disaster, the company published a set of 25 mine safety rules. As the number of accidents increased, the number of rules increased. The rules were adopted by other mining companies throughout the region, and the Coal Miner's Pocketbook listed most of the rules in its 1916 edition.

== The site today ==
The entrance to the mine, now blocked but still visible, was renovated in 2002. The entrance and a memorial to the miners killed in the accident are located behind the Mount Pleasant (PA) Township Municipal Authority building, which was formerly the lamp-house, where miners' safety lamps were stored and distributed.

== Gallery ==
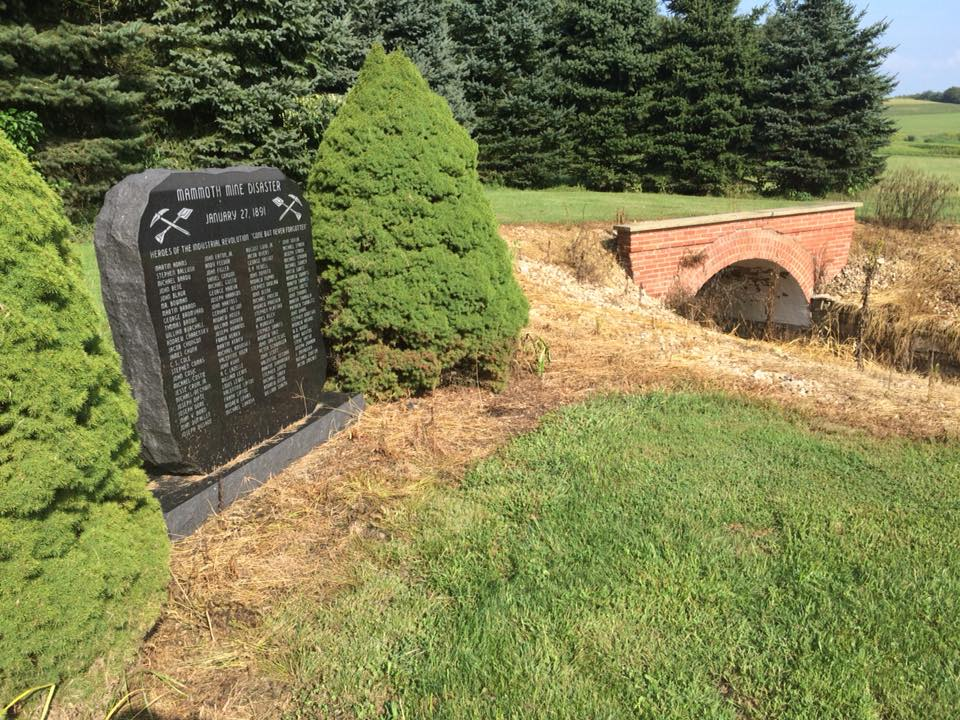
The site today. Left: memorial to miners killed. Right: entrance to mine, now blocked.

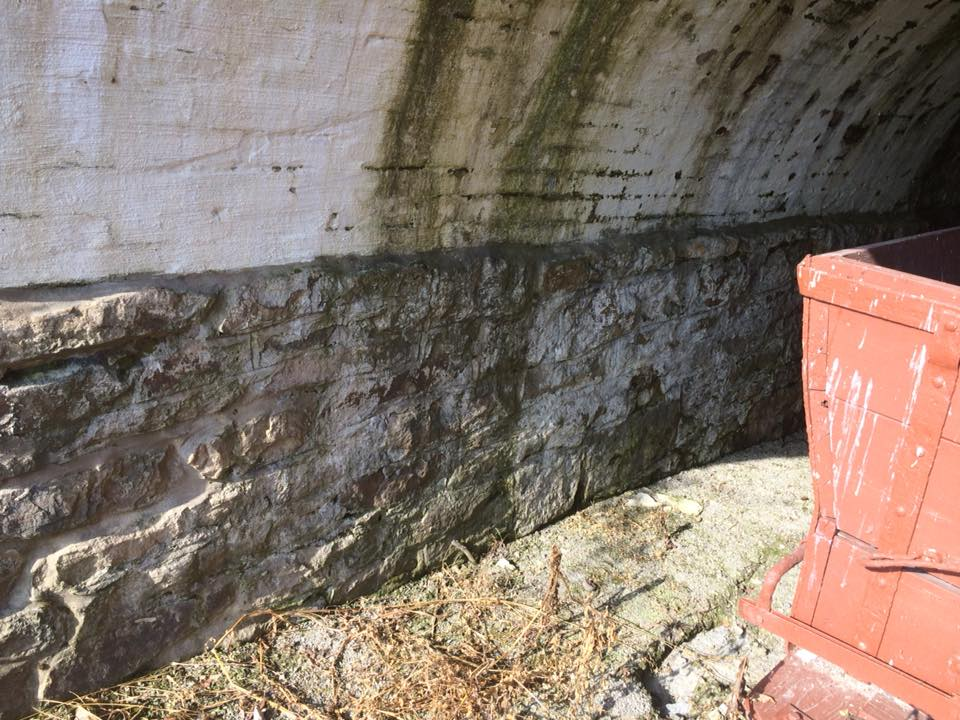
Mine entrance closeup. Mine cart at right.

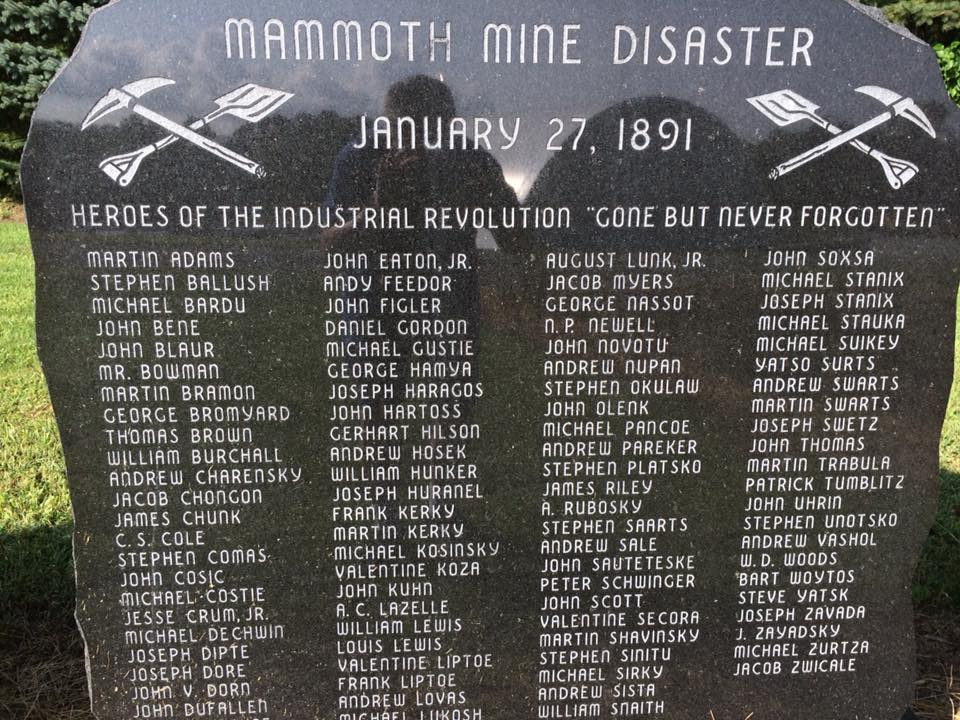
Memorial marker.

== See also ==
- Johnstown Flood
- Morewood massacre
