= Morewood, Pennsylvania =

Unincorporated community in Pennsylvania, US

Morewood
- Unincorporated community
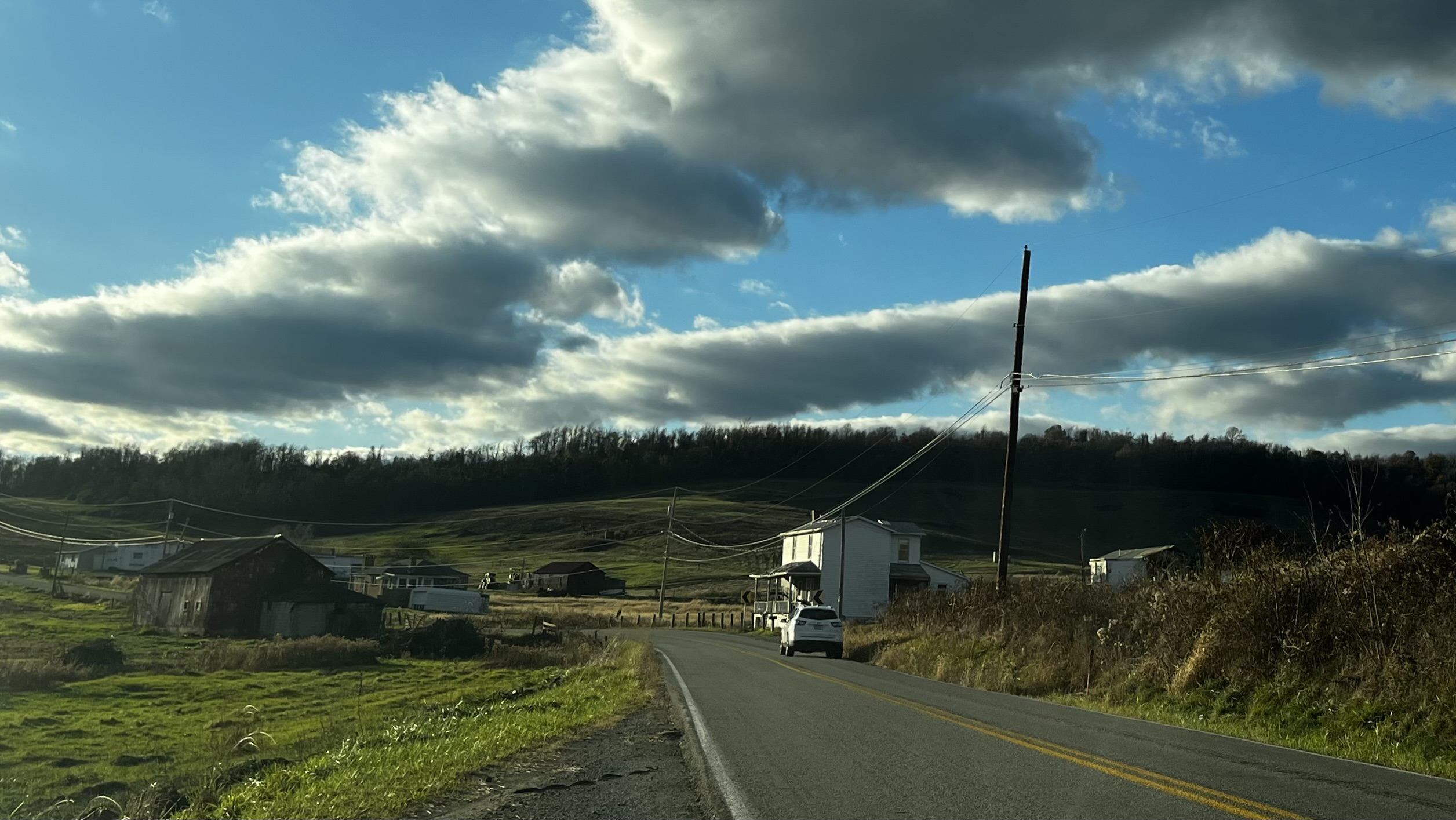
- Morewood Road in 2024

- Location within the state of Pennsylvania Morewood (the United States)
- Coordinates: 40°8′53″N 79°33′47″W
- Country: United States
- State: Pennsylvania
- County: Westmoreland
- Elevation: 1,089 ft (332 m)
- Time zone: UTC-5 (Eastern (EST))
  - Summer (DST): UTC-4 (EDT)
- GNIS feature ID: 1181541

Morewood is an unincorporated community and coal town in Westmoreland County, Pennsylvania, United States. In early April, 1891, it was the site of the Morewood massacre, which left nine striking workers of the United Mine Workers shot to death.
