= Collier, Pennsylvania =

Unincorporated community in Pennsylvania, US

Coordinates: 39°51′01″N 79°46′43″W

Collier is an unincorporated community in Fayette County, Pennsylvania, United States. It is located approximately one mile west of U.S. Route 119 and is about six miles southwest of Uniontown.

The community is named for Hon. Frederick H. Collier, a county court judge.
