= Calumet, Pennsylvania =

Unincorporated community in Pennsylvania, US

- Census-designated place
- Portion of US 981 through Calumet
- Etymology: Calumet Coke Company
- Location of Calumet in Pennsylvania Calumet, Pennsylvania (the United States)
- Coordinates: 40°12′49″N 79°29′35″W
- Country: United States
- State: Pennsylvania
- County: Westmoreland
- Township: Mount Pleasant
- Founded: 1888

Area
  - Total: 2.18 sq mi (5.65 km^{2})
  - Land: 2.18 sq mi (5.65 km^{2})
  - Water: 0 sq mi (0.00 km^{2})
- Elevation: 1,000 ft (300 m)

Population (2020)
  - Total: 1,145
  - Density: 525.0/sq mi (202.71/km^{2})
- Time zone: UTC-5 (EST)
  - Summer (DST): UTC-4 (EDT)
- ZIP code: 15621
- Area code: Area code 724
- FIPS code: 42-10832

Calumet is a census-designated place in Mount Pleasant Township, Westmoreland County, Pennsylvania, United States. Although the United States Census Bureau included it as a census-designated place with the nearby community of Norvelt for the 2000 census, they are in reality two very different communities, each reflecting a different chapter in how the Great Depression affected rural Pennsylvanians. As of the 2010 census, Calumet-Norvelt was divided into two separate CDPs officially. Calumet was a typical "patch town," another name for a coal town, built by a single company to house coal miners as cheaply as possible. The closing of the Calumet mine during the Great Depression caused enormous hardship in an era when unemployment compensation and welfare payments were nonexistent. On the other hand, Norvelt was created during the depression by the US federal government as a model community, intended to increase the standard of living of laid-off coal miners.

== Demographics ==
Historical population
Census	Pop.	Note	%±
2020	1,145		—
U.S. Decennial Census

== History ==
Calumet was founded by the Calumet Coke Company in 1888 as a housing site for its workers. The community, as originally laid out, consisted of twenty double houses, twelve single-family houses, and a few commercial and industrial buildings. The workers were employed in a coal mine and also tended ovens that produced coke (fuel). During the Bituminous Coal Miners' Strike of 1894, Calumet was the site of a bitter confrontation between the strikers and the H. C. Frick Coke Company, which at that time was part-owner of Calumet Coke Company.

The coke works closed in the 1920s, and the mine closed in the early 1930s during the Great Depression, causing enormous hardship for the community's workers.

== Calumet Mine and Coke Works ==
In 1888, the Calumet Coke Company established the Calumet Mine & Coke Works along Sewickley Creek in Mount Pleasant Township, Westmoreland County, Pennsylvania. The Company built twenty-three houses in 1888 and the Calumet Coke Works containing 105 beehive coke ovens. This operation was served by the Southwest Branch of the Pennsylvania Railroad. About 100 miners were employed in the mine (a shaft operation) that exploited Calumet's 80-inch-thick (2,000 mm) Pittsburgh coal seam, and 75 coke workers were employed in the coke works.

By the early 1890s the Calumet Coke Works was enlarged and contained 225 beehive coke ovens. Typical annual production at the Calumet Mine in the 1890s was about 100,000 tons of coal; the Calumet Coke Works produced about 60,000 tons of coke each year. In 1889, after one year of production at the Calumet Mine & Coke Works, by the Calumet Coke Company, the H. C. Frick Coke Company acquired a one-half interest in the Calumet Coke Company.

During the bitter coal miners strike of 1894, a dozen deputy sheriffs, that were being paid by the H. C. Frick Coke Company at Calumet, while off duty, went swimming in the reservoir there. Two of them were captured by several hundred angry strikers. The others escaped.

By 1899 H. C. Frick Coke Company acquired control of the entire Calumet Coke Company. Under the auspices of the H. C. Frick Coke Company production at Calumet Mine rose through the early 1900s, despite the fact that the coal company continued to mine the coal by using hand labor. H. C. Frick's theory was, why spend money on mining equipment, when you had willing men with weak minds and strong backs, that worked cheap, to do the mining work for you.

By 1900 over 900 persons, the miners and their families, were living in the coal company patch town of Calumet, in Mt. Pleasant Township, the Calumet Mine was annually producing over 200,000 tons of coal, and the Calumet Coke Works was shipping between 125,000 and 150,000 tons of coke each year. Robert Ramsey, a long-time H. C. Frick Coke Company employee, served as superintendent of the Calumet Mine & Coke Works operations at Calumet.

The condition of Calumet Mine in 1910, from the mine inspectors reports, was:

"Calumet Mine - Ventilation is good, except in a small section of the pillar workings to the left of the main haulage road. Drainage fair. Improvements made to Calumet Mine in 1910 were: 230 Wolfe safety lamps and equipment were renewed. Work was started on safety latches at landing for the shaft cage."

From the 1910s through the early 1920s the Calumet Mine was consistently one of the H. C. Frick Coke Company's better producers. By 1914 the H. C. Frick Coke Company employed 260 men and boys at the Calumet Mine, who produced over 225,000 tons of coal and 150,000 tons of coke.

Production at the mine decreased after World War I, as with many other Frick mines the company did not mechanize or fully electrify its operation.

In 1919 Calumet Mine produced 189,557 tons of coal and 69,589 tons of coke, there were 260 coke ovens with 127 in operation. The mine had 270 employees, and one fatal accident in 1919. In 1920 Calumet Mine produced 157,816 tons of coal and 85,641 tons of coke, there were 260 beehive coke ovens with 150 in operation, and employed 241 men and boys. The mine had three nonfatal accidents in 1920.

As late as 1930 the H. C. Frick Coke Company was still using eleven mules or horses for hauling coal in the Calumet Mine, in addition to a single steam locomotive, and two mine locomotives operated by compressed air. Production in ca. 1930 amounted to a mere 9,000 tons of coal. The Calumet Coke Works had been abandoned by this time.

Around 1932 the H. C. Frick Coke Company closed and abandoned the Calumet Mine and sent a number of the miners to the Standard Shaft Mine near Mount Pleasant, and laid off the rest of the coal miners to fend for themselves, with no compensation or means of support.

== See also ==
- Calumet-Norvelt, Pennsylvania
