= Morewood massacre =

1891 massacre in Pennsylvania, US

Coordinates: 40.148323°N 79.563137°W

Morewood Massacre
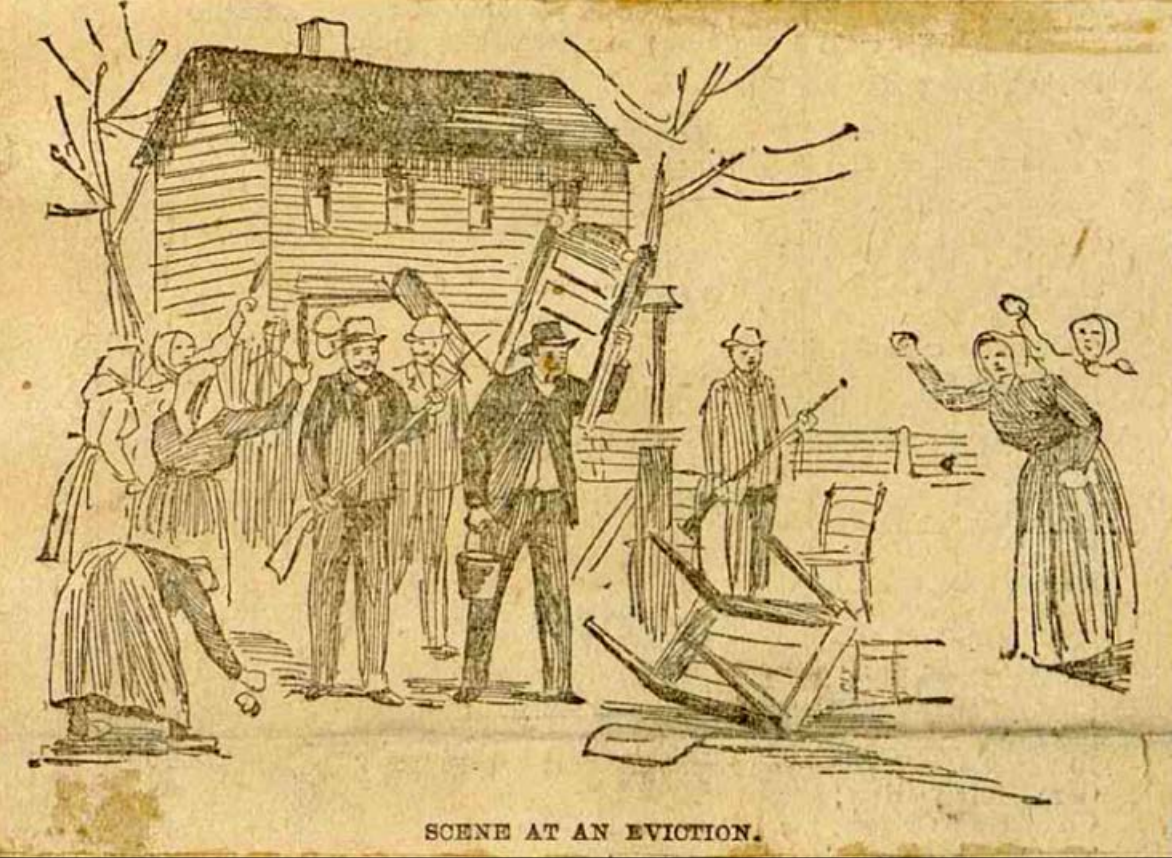
- Miners and their families getting evicted from company housing during the strike.
- Date: February 10 – May 26, 1891 (3 months, 2 weeks and 2 days)
- Location: Westmoreland County, Pennsylvania
- Goals: Higher wages Eight-hour day
- Methods: Strikes, protests, demonstrations
- Result: Unsuccessful

Parties
United Mine Workers; Coal miners	Frick Coke Company; Pinkerton detectives Penn. National Guard

Lead figures
	Captain Loar; Henry Clay Frick (Owner); Andrew Carnegie (Owner)

Number
16,000	

Casualties and losses
9	

The Morewood massacre was an armed labor-union conflict in Morewood, Pennsylvania, in Westmoreland County, west of the present-day borough Mount Pleasant in 1891.

== Casualties and causes ==
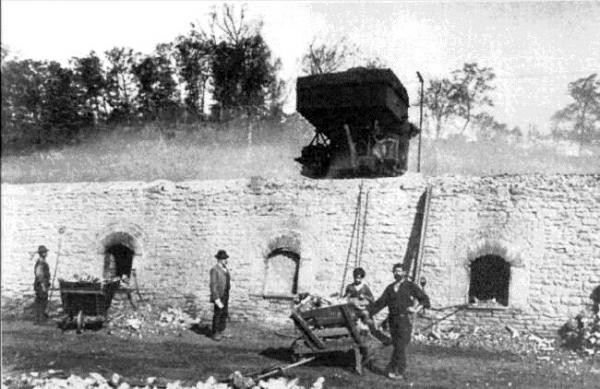
Laborers at Morewood Works, c.1890

In the late 1800s, Mount Pleasant, Pennsylvania was a major center for the coal, coke, and steel industries. Coke, a fuel derived from coal, was essential for iron smelting, which in turn supported the booming steel industry. Industrialists like Henry Clay Frick capitalized on this demand, establishing extensive coke works and utilizing a large labor force, often composed of Eastern European immigrants who worked under harsh conditions. Labor unions grew in response to these working conditions, and strikes were common as miners sought fairer wages and safer workplaces. The rising demand for coke during this period attracted immigrants, particularly from Eastern Europe, to the region, providing industrialists like Andrew Carnegie and Frick with a steady supply of labor for the mines and coke ovens. However, the dangerous working conditions and low wages led to unionization and labor strikes as workers sought better wages and safer conditions.

By the 1880s, unionization in Pennsylvania's mining communities had become increasingly militant, with organized laborers confronting corporations backed by private security forces who were hired to counter union efforts. In Southwestern Pennsylvania's coke region, strikes were common; between 1881 and 1886, miners organized around 800 strikes to maintain or improve their wages.

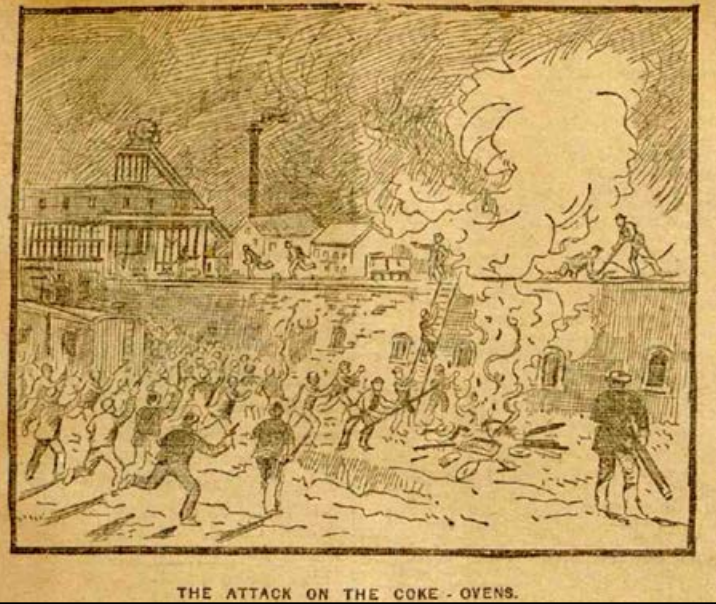
Workers attack the coke ovens to stop work at the mines during the strike

In 1890, the United Mine Workers of America (UMWA) submitted demands to the coke operators that included an eight-hour workday, wage increases, restrictions on house rent, and the right to union-only employment. However, a downturn in the coke industry in 1890 led to the temporary closure of about 20% of Frick's operations. By early 1891, when production resumed, miners found that they were to be paid based on a sliding wage scale tied to coke prices, a change that many felt was unjust. Tensions mounted as operators hired replacement workers and evicted striking miners and their families from company housing. The Morewood strike began on February 10, 1891, when miners in the region, supported by the UMWA, stopped work in protest of pay and working conditions. Tensions rose as workers and their families were evicted from company-owned housing, and Frick, known for his tough stance against unions, resisted their demands. By March, unrest had intensified, and on March 30, a group of about a thousand strikers, some accompanied by a brass band, marched on the Morewood company town.

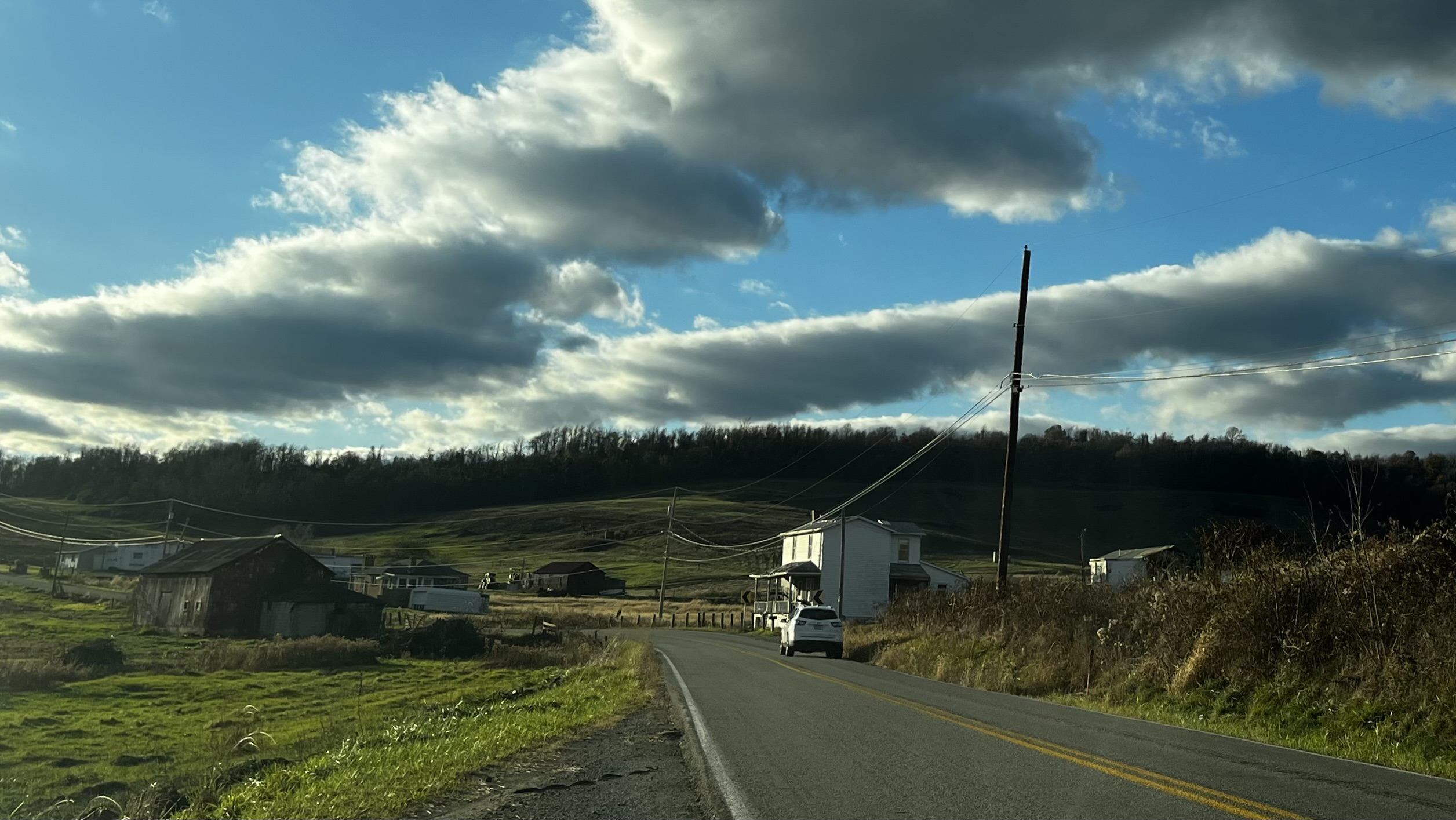
Morewood Road in Mount Pleasant as it appeared in 2024

In March 1891, violence erupted as striking miners, some facing eviction and economic hardship, began targeting company facilities and replacement workers. On March 30, a group of approximately 1,000 miners marched to the Morewood Works, where local law enforcement, led by Captain Loar, confronted them. When the crowd reached the Morewood Works gates, Loar and 12 deputies fired into the crowd, killing nine miners and wounding others, most of whom were recent immigrants from Eastern Europe. Loar and his deputies were later acquitted, underscoring the legal challenges faced by labor activists at the time.

A Pennsylvania state historical marker describing the Morewood event was erected in 2000 on Route 981 (Morewood Road) near the Route 119 overpass.

== Gallery ==
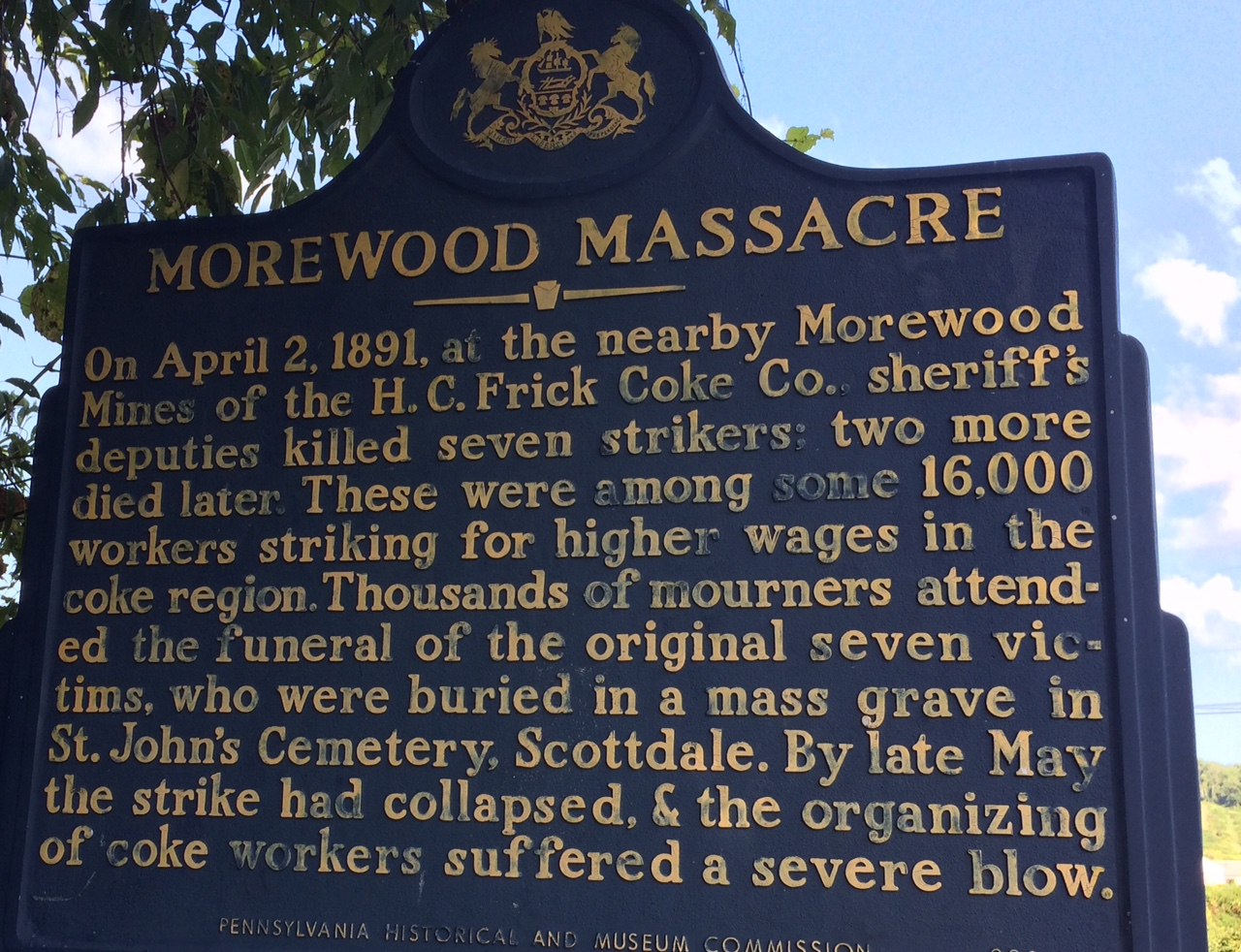
Marker commemorating the Morewood massacre

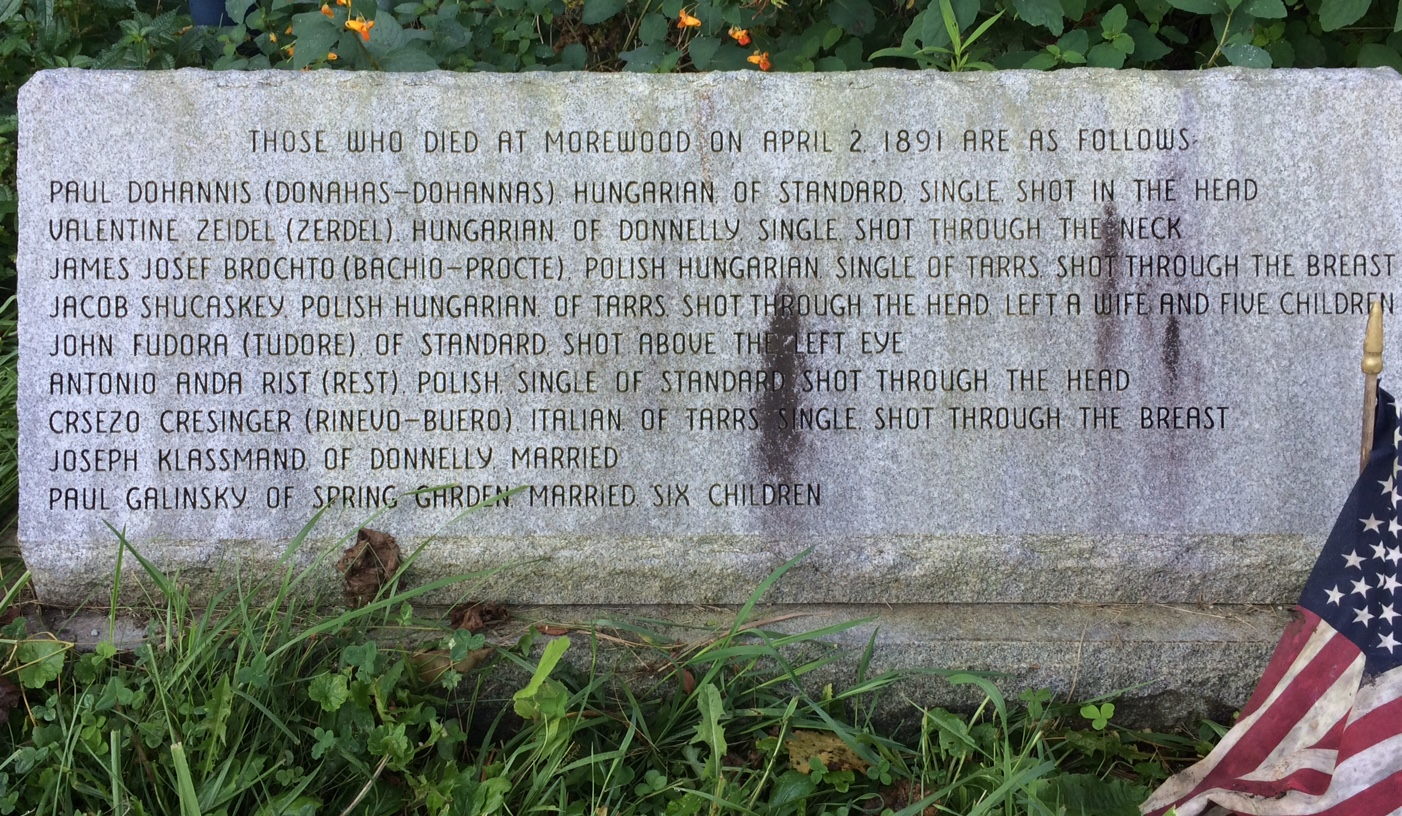
Names of strikers killed in Morewood labor unrest

== See also ==
- Homestead strike of 1892
- Johnstown Flood of 1889
- Mammoth Mine disaster – January 27, 1891 gas explosion at Frick's coal mine in Mount Pleasant
- Murder of workers in labor disputes in the United States
