= Outcrop, Pennsylvania =

Unincorporated community in Pennsylvania, U.S.

Coordinates: 39°45′57″N 79°49′30″W

Outcrop is an unincorporated community in Fayette County, Pennsylvania, United States.

== History ==
A post office called Outcrop was established in 1900, and remained in operation until 1934. The origin of the name "Outcrop" is obscure.
