= Mount Braddock, Pennsylvania =

Unincorporated community in Pennsylvania, US

- Unincorporated community
- Location within Pennsylvania
- Coordinates: 39°56′34″N 79°38′40″W
- Country: United States
- State: Pennsylvania
- County: Fayette
- Elevation: 1,175 ft (358 m)
- Time zone: UTC-5 (Eastern (EST))
  - Summer (DST): UTC-4 (EDT)
- ZIP code: 15465
- Area codes: 724, 878
- GNIS feature ID: 1213153

Mount Braddock is an unincorporated community in Fayette County, Pennsylvania, United States. The community is located near U.S. Route 119, 4.8 miles (7.7 km) northeast of Uniontown. Mount Braddock has a post office, with ZIP code 15465, which opened on June 12, 1873.
