= Brownfield, Pennsylvania =

Unincorporated community in Pennsylvania, US

- Unincorporated community
- Location within Pennsylvania
- Coordinates: 39°51′25″N 79°42′43″W
- Country: United States
- State: Pennsylvania
- County: Fayette
- Elevation: 1,204 ft (367 m)
- Time zone: UTC-5 (Eastern (EST))
  - Summer (DST): UTC-4 (EDT)
- ZIP code: 15416
- Area codes: 724, 878
- GNIS feature ID: 1170359

Brownfield is an unincorporated community in Fayette County, Pennsylvania, United States. The community is located 3 miles (4.8 km) south of Uniontown. Brownfield has a post office, with ZIP code 15416.
