= Uledi, Pennsylvania =

Unincorporated community in Pennsylvania, US

- Unincorporated community
- Location within Pennsylvania
- Coordinates: 39°53′46″N 79°47′25″W
- Country: United States
- State: Pennsylvania
- County: Fayette
- Elevation: 1,175 ft (358 m)
- Time zone: UTC-5 (Eastern (EST))
  - Summer (DST): UTC-4 (EDT)
- ZIP code: 15484
- Area codes: 724, 878
- GNIS feature ID: 1184952

Uledi is an unincorporated community in Fayette County, Pennsylvania, United States. The community is located along Pennsylvania Route 21, 4 miles (6.4 km) west of Uniontown. Uledi has a post office, with ZIP code 15484, which opened on April 14, 1902.
