= Fort Allen (Westmoreland County, Pennsylvania) =

Coordinates: 40.27905°N 79.59163°W

- Hempfield Township, Pennsylvania in United States
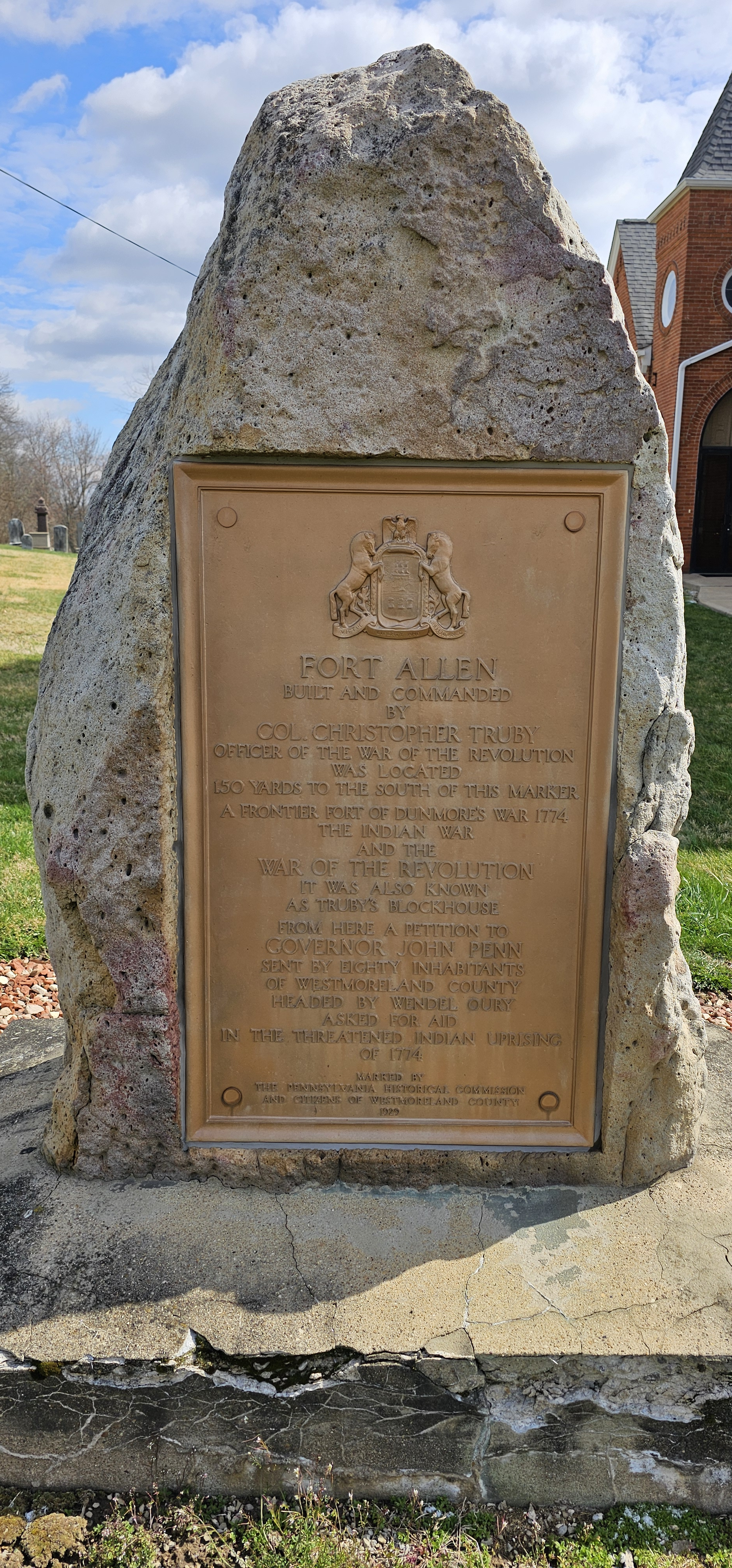
- Landmark at the former site of Fort Allen, erected in 1929.

Site information
- Type: Military Fort

Site history
- Built: 1774

Fort Allen (also known as "Truby's Blockhouse") was a military structure which was built in Hempfield Township, Westmoreland County in the Province of Pennsylvania by Colonel Christopher Truby of Pennsylvania's colonial militia. Erected in 1774 in response to a threatened attack by Indians upon German pioneers who had settled in the area, it became a frontier fort of Dunmore's War in 1774, and also was used as a fort during the American Revolution in which Truby also served as an officer with the Continental Army.

== History ==
Following a series of attacks during the 1750s by Indians on German pioneers and other immigrants who had begun relocating to, and settling in, various parts of Pennsylvania, including west of the Susquehanna River, colonial government leaders began receiving petitions from hundreds of those settlers for protection. In response, the Province of Pennsylvania spent eighty-five thousand pounds to erect a chain of blockhouses and forts along the Kittanning Hills from the Delaware River to the province's border with Maryland. Those military installations were then manned with between 20 and 75 members of the provincial militia.

With respect to Westmoreland County settlers who desired greater protection, those petitioning the colonial government from Hempfield Township were:

Wendel Oury, Christopher Trubee [sic], Frantz Raupp, Nicholas Scheuer, John Lafferty, John Bendeary, Conrad Houck, James Waterms, John Redeck, Adam George, Nicholas Allimang, Adam Uhreg, Stefel Urich, John Golden, Peter Urich, Martin Hunts, Michael Konel, Henrich Kleyn, Conrad Hister, Hans Gunckee, Peter Kasner, Peter Uber, John Kransher, Henrich Schmit, Jacob Schmit, Jacob Kuemel, John Moffey, Adam Bricker, Peter Wannemacher, Philip Klingelschmit, Peter Klingelschmit, Peter Altman, Andoni Altman, Joseph Pankkek, Brent Reis, Baltzer Moyer, Jacob Hauser, Peter Altman, Christian Baum, George Crier, Peter Rosch, Joseph Kutz, Adam Meire, Daniel Wilers, Thomas Williams, Michel Hatz, George Mondorf, William Hanson, William Altman, Marx Breinig, Johannes Breinig, Samuel Lewisch, Andeny Walter, Jacob Welcker, George Bender, Nicholas Junt, Michel Hann, David Marschal, Heinrich Sil, Richard Archbold, Conrad Linck, Friedrich Marschal, Hannes Breynig, Kasper Mickendorf, Jacob Schraber, Daniel Matiss, Heinrich Schram, Peter Schelhammer, Jacob Meylin, Dewalt Macklin, Hannes Kostwicz, Jacob Schram, Lutwig Aterman, Hans Sil, Jacob Stroh, Christopher Herolt, Gerhart Tames.

In response, Colonel Christopher Truby (in one source, spelled "Trubee") of Pennsylvania's colonial militia erected Fort Allen in Hempstead Township, Westmoreland County in 1774. It is believed that this fort was named for Andrew Allen of the state's then governing body, the Supreme Executive Council. Following its construction, Truby assumed command of the installation. Also known as "Truby's Blockhouse," Fort Allen subsequently became a frontier fort for Dunmore's War in 1774 and then the Revolutionary War.

In modern times, the area surrounding the site of the fort has grown into an expansive neighborhood of Hempfield Township, with streets named after various Native American tribes. Fort Allen Elementary School, built in 1952 and part of the Hempfield Area School District, was also named after the fort.

== Monuments and markers ==
A stone monument commemorating Fort Allen, which was erected on May 1, 1929, is located on the grounds of St. John's Harrold United Church of Christ at the corner of St. John's Church Road and Baltzer Meyer Pike (roughly 150 yards north of where the fort was located).

A roadside marker erected on December 12, 1946, by the Pennsylvania Historical and Museum Commission at the intersection of Route 136 and Baltzer Meyer Pike reads:

Frontier post built by Pennsylvania German pioneers of the Harrold's and Brush Creek settlements in 1774. It was a refuge from Indians in Dunmore's War and the American Revolution. The site was a little to the south.
