= Mount Pleasant Township, Westmoreland County, Pennsylvania =

Township in Pennsylvania, US

Coordinates: 40°07′00″N 79°24′59″W

- Township
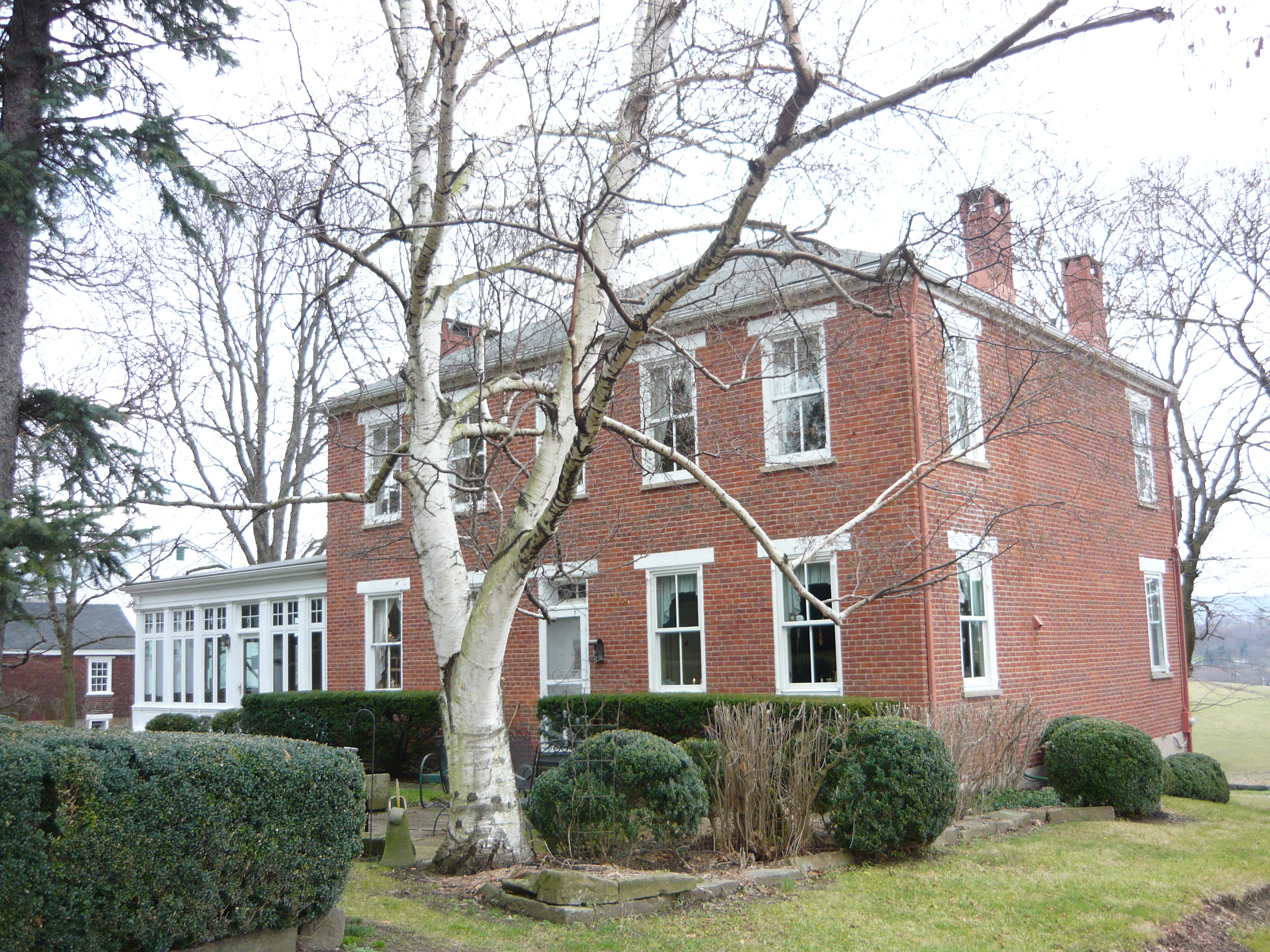
- Sewickley Manor (1852); National Register of Historic Places

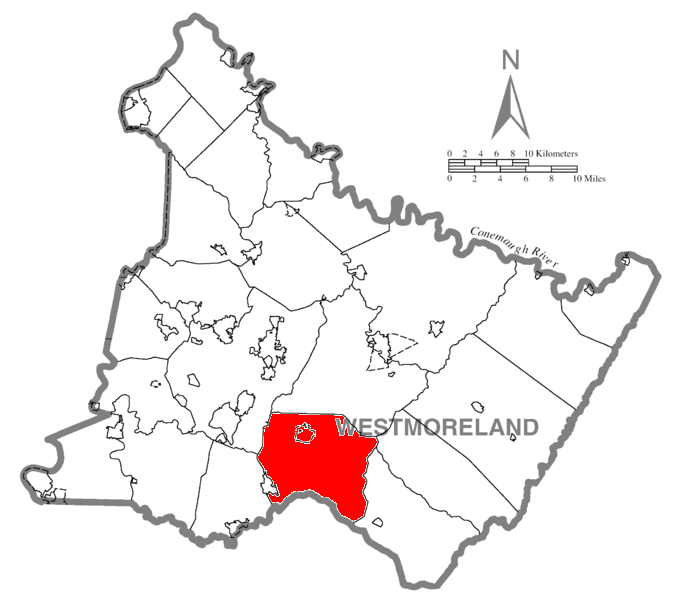
- Map of Westmoreland County, Pennsylvania Highlighting Mount Pleasnt Township

- Map of Pennsylvania highlighting Westmoreland County
- Country: United States
- State: Pennsylvania
- County: Westmoreland
- Settled: 1770

Area
  - Total: 55.50 sq mi (143.75 km^{2})
  - Land: 55.36 sq mi (143.39 km^{2})
  - Water: 0.14 sq mi (0.37 km^{2})

Population (2020)
  - Total: 10,119
  - Estimate (2022): 10,025
  - Density: 182.8/sq mi (70.57/km^{2})
- Time zone: UTC-5 (Eastern (EST))
  - Summer (DST): UTC-4 (EDT)
- FIPS code: 42-129-51888
- Website: http://www.mtpleasanttwp.com

Mount Pleasant Township is a township in Westmoreland County, Pennsylvania, United States. As of the 2020 census, the township population was 10,119. Mount Pleasant Township should not be confused with the Borough of Mount Pleasant, which is a separate municipality and comprises the town of that name.

== History ==
The Adam Fisher Homestead and Sewickley Manor are listed on the National Register of Historic Places.

The Jacob's Creek Bridge, the first iron-chain suspension bridge built in the United States, was erected at the southwest corner of the township in 1801. It was demolished in 1833, but the area is still called "Iron Bridge."

In 1891 the township was the site of the Mammoth mine disaster, in which over 100 miners died.

== Geography ==
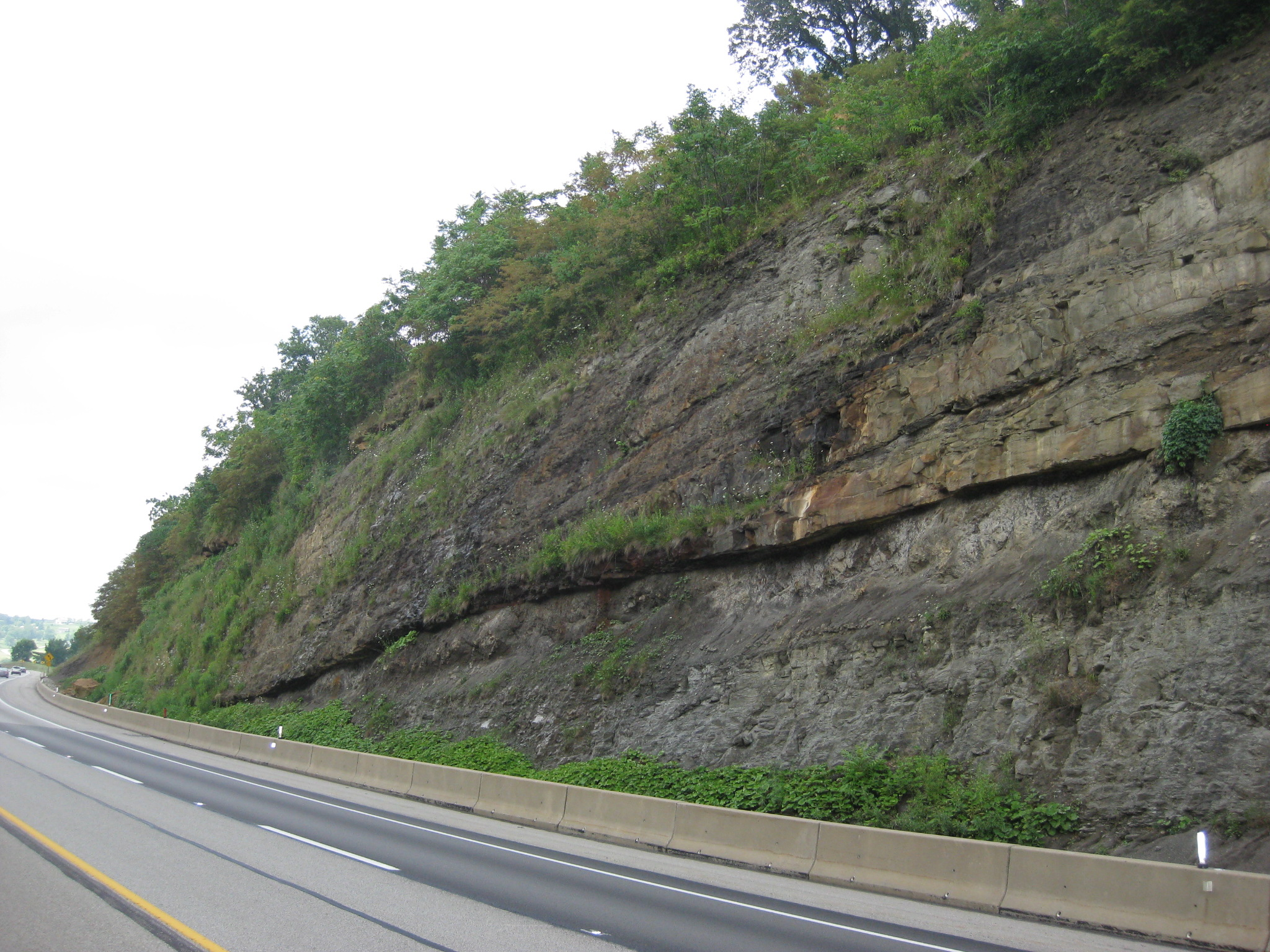
Outcrop of the Casselman Formation, viewed at milepost 84.2 on the Pennsylvania Turnpike

According to the United States Census Bureau, the township has a total area of 55.5 square miles (143.7 km^{2}), of which 55.4 square miles (143.5 km^{2}) is land and 0.1 square miles (0.3 km^{2}) (0.25%) is water.

The township includes the following communities: Bridgeport, Brinkerton, Calumet, Carpentertown, Hecla, Kecksburg, Mammoth, Mellingertown, Mt. Joy, Norvelt, Rodney, Southwest, Standard, Trauger, United, and Weltytown.

== Demographics ==
Historical population
Census	Pop.	Note	%±
2000	11,153		—
2010	10,911		−2.2%
2020	10,119		−7.3%
2022 (est.)	10,025		−0.9%
U.S. Decennial Census

As of the census of 2000, there were 11,153 people, 4,385 households, and 3,266 families residing in the township. The population density was 200.0 inhabitants per square mile (77.2/km^{2}). There were 4,668 housing units at an average density of 83.7 per square mile (32.3/km^{2}). The racial makeup of the township was 99.20% White, 0.25% African American, 0.01% Native American, 0.04% Asian, 0.01% Pacific Islander, 0.10% from other races, and 0.39% from two or more races. Hispanic or Latino of any race were 0.39% of the population.

There were 4,385 households, out of which 29.1% had children under the age of 18 living with them, 62.0% were married couples living together, 8.8% had a female householder with no husband present, and 25.5% were non-families. 22.8% of all households were made up of individuals, and 12.2% had someone living alone who was 65 years of age or older. The average household size was 2.53 and the average family size was 2.96.

In the township the population was spread out, with 21.7% under the age of 18, 7.3% from 18 to 24, 27.7% from 25 to 44, 26.4% from 45 to 64, and 16.9% who were 65 years of age or older. The median age was 41 years. For every 100 females, there were 94.6 males. For every 100 females age 18 and over, there were 92.5 males.

The median income for a household in the township was $35,431, and the median income for a family was $41,908. Males had a median income of $31,132 versus $22,107 for females. The per capita income for the township was $15,968. About 6.5% of families and 8.8% of the population were below the poverty line, including 13.0% of those under age 18 and 6.2% of those age 65 or over.
