= Whitney, Pennsylvania =

Unincorporated community in Pennsylvania, US

- Unincorporated community
- Location within Pennsylvania
- Coordinates: 40°15′12″N 79°24′37″W
- Country: United States
- State: Pennsylvania
- County: Westmoreland
- Elevation: 1,106 ft (337 m)
- Time zone: UTC-5 (Eastern (EST))
  - Summer (DST): UTC-4 (EDT)
- ZIP code: 15693
- Area codes: 724, 878
- GNIS feature ID: 1191356

Whitney is an unincorporated community in Westmoreland County, Pennsylvania, United States. The community is 5 miles (8.0 km) south-southwest of Latrobe. Whitney has a post office, with ZIP code 15693.
