= Trauger, Pennsylvania =

Unincorporated community in Pennsylvania, US

Trauger
- Unincorporated community
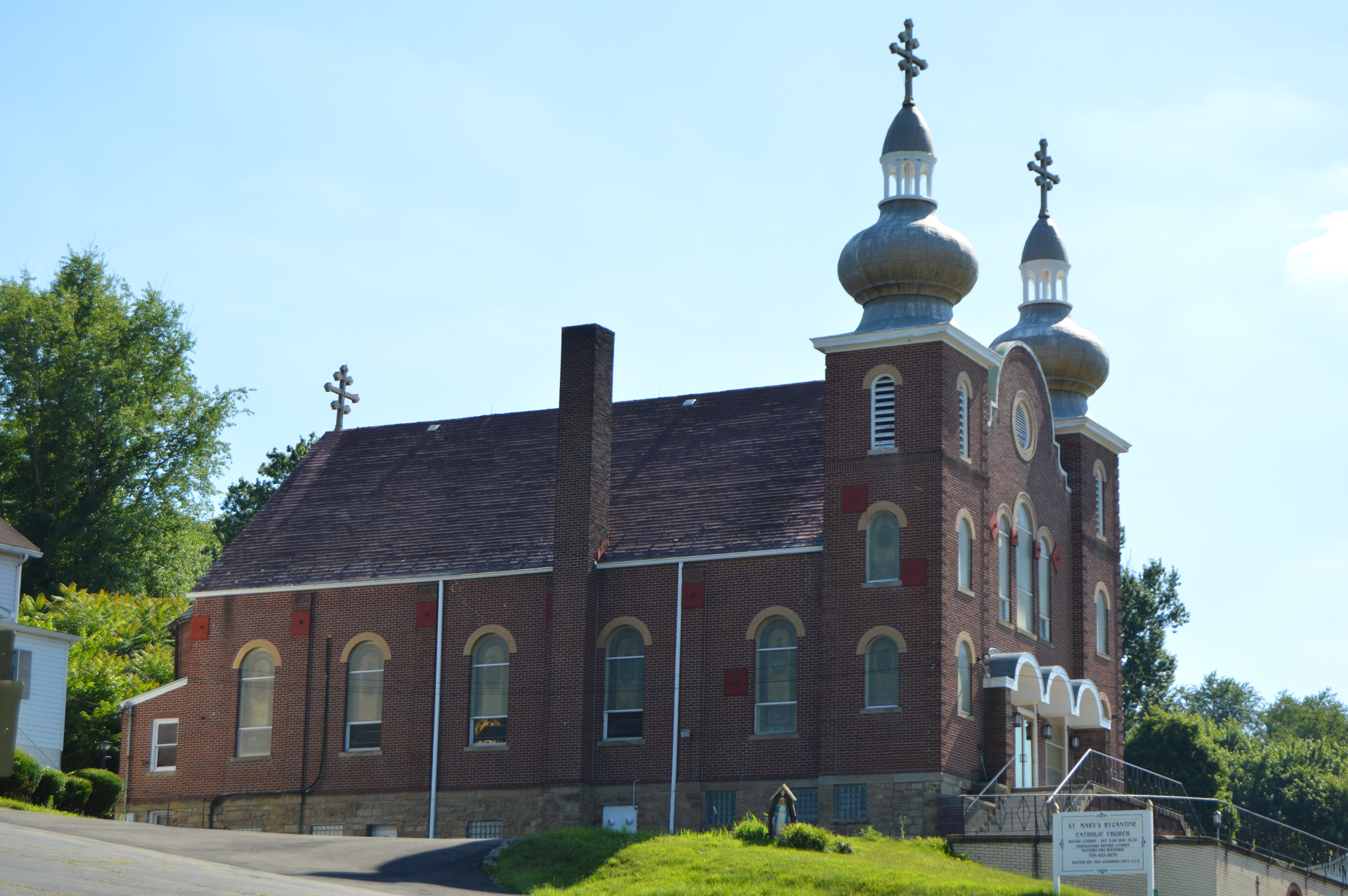
- St. Mary's Byzantine Catholic Church

- Location within the state of Pennsylvania Trauger (the United States)
- Coordinates: 40°13′58″N 79°27′45″W
- Country: United States
- State: Pennsylvania
- County: Westmoreland
- Elevation: 1,033 ft (315 m)
- Time zone: UTC-5 (Eastern (EST))
  - Summer (DST): UTC-4 (EDT)
- GNIS feature ID: 1189727

Trauger is an unincorporated community and coal town in Westmoreland County, Pennsylvania, United States.

An architecturally impressive historic structure built in 1914, St. Mary's Byzantine Catholic Church is large brick building in the Spanish Renaissance style.
