= Pennsylvania Route 217 =

State highway in Pennsylvania, US

Pennsylvania Route 217

Route information
- Maintained by PennDOT
- Length: 21.543 mi (34.670 km)

Major junctions
- South end: US 30 near Latrobe
- US 22 / US 119 in Blairsville
- North end: PA 286 near Jacksonville

Location
- Country: United States
- State: Pennsylvania
- Counties: Westmoreland, Indiana

Highway system
- Pennsylvania State Route System; Interstate; US; State; Scenic; Legislative
← PA 216	→ PA 218
← I-676	PA 680	→ PA 683

Pennsylvania Route 217 (PA 217) is a 21-mile-long (34 km) state highway located in Westmoreland and Indiana counties in Pennsylvania. The southern terminus is at U.S. Route 30 (US 30) near Latrobe. The northern terminus is at PA 286 near Jacksonville.

== Route description ==
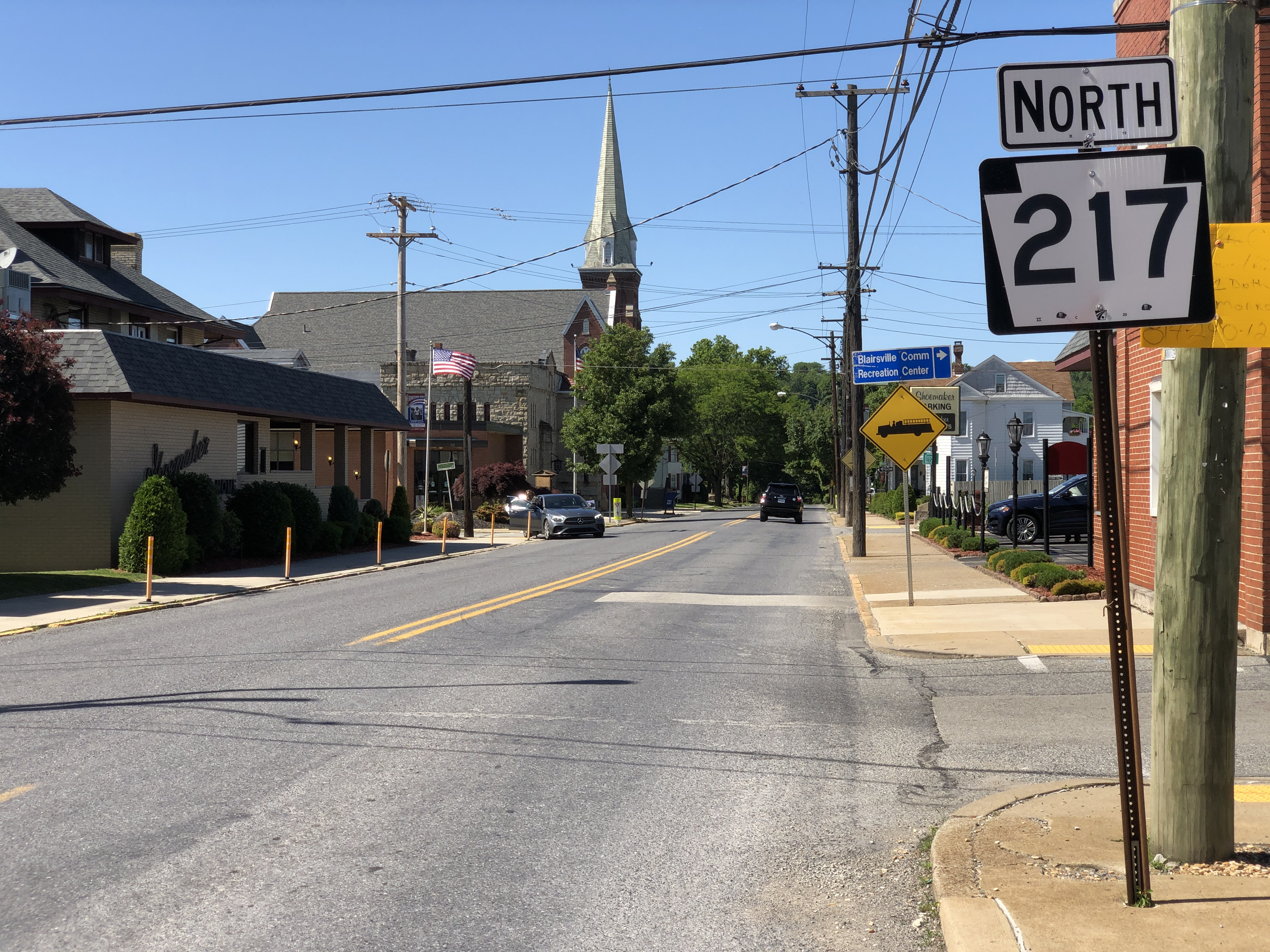
PA 217 northbound in Blairsville

PA 217 begins at an intersection with the eastbound lanes of US 30 in Unity Township, Westmoreland County. The road crosses the Loyalhanna Creek into Derry Township, intersecting the westbound lanes of US 30. From here, the route heads north on a two-lane undivided road, passing through Kingston and running through wooded areas with some homes. PA 217 turns northeast into areas of fields and residences as West 4th Avenue. The road passes homes and some businesses in the community of West Derry before crossing into the borough of Derry, where it continues through residential areas. The route turns northwest onto Y Street and heads into commercial areas, passing over Norfolk Southern's Pittsburgh Line and becoming Leo Street. PA 217 turns northeast onto West Owens Avenue and passes homes, briefly becoming East Owens Avenue before turning into East 4th Street. The road heads back into Derry Township and continues through woodland with some homes, soon passing between a trailer park to the west and the Norfolk Southern line to the east. The route runs through more areas of farms and woods with residences, heading farther west from the railroad tracks. PA 217 winds to the north as it continues through more woods, passing the residential community of Brenizer before running through more fields and woodland with some homes.

PA 217 crosses the Conemaugh River into Burrell Township in Indiana County and becomes Walnut Street, passing through woods before entering the borough of Blairsville. The road name changes to South Walnut Street and it passes homes before heading into the commercial downtown. At the Market Street intersection, the route becomes North Main Street and heads through more of the downtown prior to passing more homes. PA 217 passes under Norfolk Southern's Conemaugh Line and turns west onto West Burrell Street, with North Walnut Street continuing north to an interchange that provides access to and from eastbound US 22/northbound US 119. The road curves to the northwest and runs between the railroad line to the southwest and residential areas to the northeast, passing under US 22/US 119 and coming to an interchange that provides access to and from westbound US 22/southbound US 119. Past this interchange, the route becomes an unnamed road and heads back into Burrell Township, making a curve to the northeast before a hairpin turn to the southwest and a turn back to the northwest. PA 217 curves to the north and heads through a mix of farmland and woodland with a few homes. The road crosses the Blacklick Creek into Black Lick Township and continues north through more rural areas. The route heads northwest through agricultural areas with some woods, making a turn back to the north. PA 217 runs north-northeast through more farmland and woodland with a few residences, turning northwest to come to its northern terminus at PA 286.

== Major intersections ==
County	Location	mi	km	Destinations	Notes
Westmoreland	Unity Township	0.0	0.0	US 30 east (Lincoln Highway) – Ligonier	Southern terminus
Westmoreland	Derry Township	0.1	0.16	US 30 west (Lincoln Highway) – Greensburg	
Indiana	Blairsville	12.6	20.3	US 22 / US 119 (William Penn Highway) – Pittsburgh, Indiana, Ebensburg	Interchange
Indiana	Black Lick Township	21.5	34.6	PA 286 – Jacksonville, Saltsburg, Indiana	Northern terminus
1.000 mi = 1.609 km; 1.000 km = 0.621 mi
