= Pennsylvania Route 982 =

State highway in Pennsylvania, US

Pennsylvania Route 982

Route information
- Maintained by PennDOT
- Length: 32.151 mi (51.742 km)
- Existed: 1928–present

Major junctions
- South end: US 119 at Moyer
- PA 31 near Mount Pleasant; PA 130 near Pleasant Unity; US 30 near Youngstown
- North end: US 22 / US 119 near Blairsville

Location
- Country: United States
- State: Pennsylvania
- Counties: Fayette, Westmoreland

Highway system
- Pennsylvania State Route System; Interstate; US; State; Scenic; Legislative
← PA 981	→ PA 983

Pennsylvania Route 982 (PA 982) is a state highway which runs 32.15 miles across Fayette and Westmoreland counties, in southwestern Pennsylvania. The highway begins at U.S. Route 119 (US 119) in Moyer, Pennsylvania, and runs northward into Westmoreland County, passing through the towns of Youngstown, Latrobe, and Derry before ending at US 22/US 119 near Blairsville.

== Route description ==
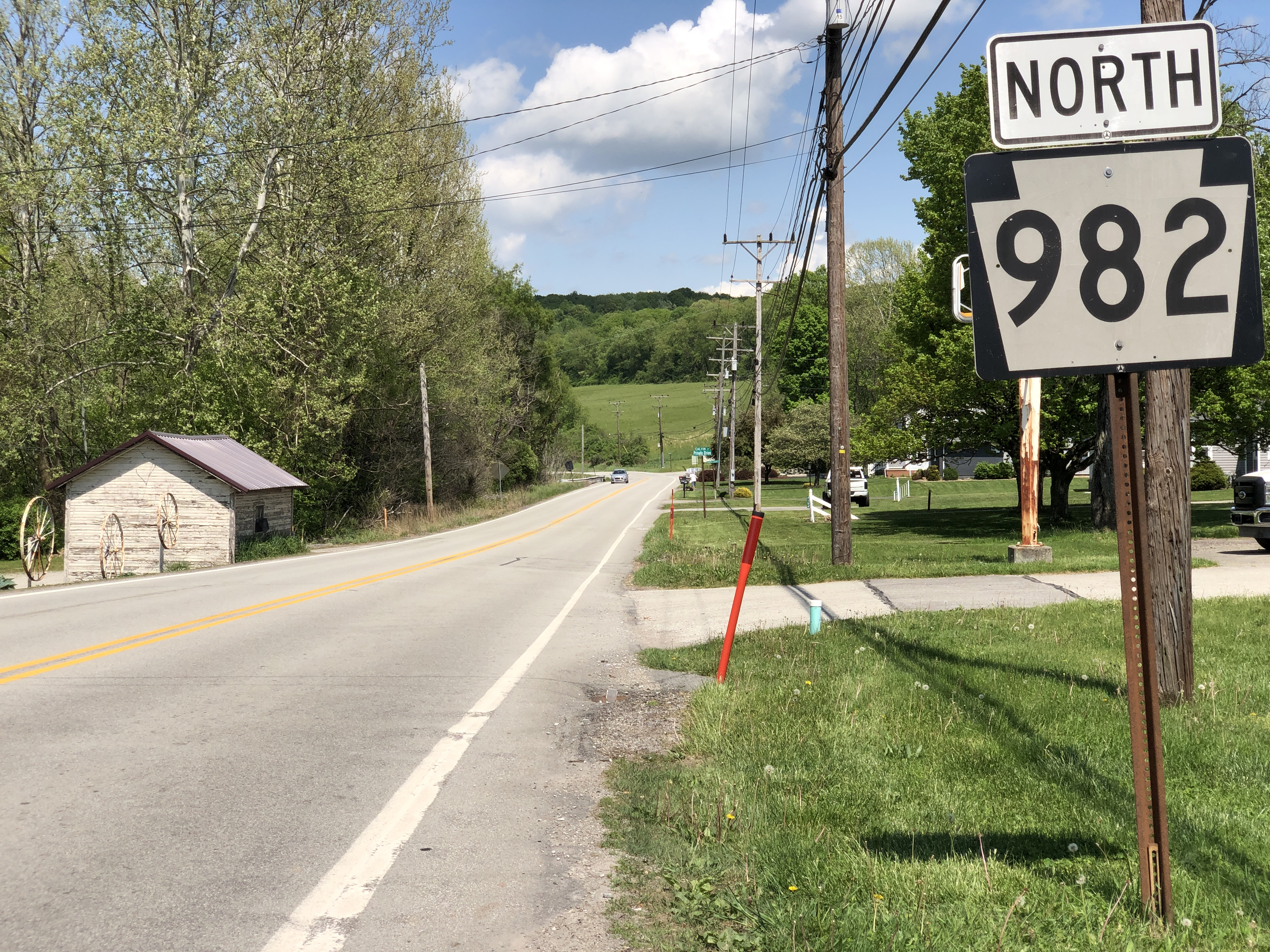
PA 982 northbound in Unity Township

PA 982 begins at US 119 near Moyer. From there, it runs northeast across rural Fayette County, meeting PA 31 at the Fayette/Westmoreland county line. The route continues into rural Westmoreland County, crossing the Pennsylvania Turnpike (I-70/I-76) without access.

The route intersects PA 130 about two miles (3 km) southeast of Pleasant Unity, where it is briefly concurrent with PA 130 as the route heads north and east through the village of Lycippus. The route then passes through the borough of Youngstown, and then meets US 30 at a cloverleaf interchange.

The route runs along the eastern end of the city of Latrobe and through McChesneytown. PA 982 then ends at US 22 and US 119 near the borough of Blairsville. Before the construction of the Conemaugh Dam, PA 982 used to occupy Livermore Road, across from its current terminus, and continued on, crossing the Conemaugh River at Livermore, and connecting with PA 217 a few miles north in Indiana County.

== Major intersections ==
County	Location	mi	km	Destinations	Notes
Fayette	Bullskin Township	0.00	0.00	US 119 (Memorial Boulevard)	Southern terminus
Fayette	Bullskin Township	7.98	12.84	PA 31 (Three Mile Hill Road)	
Westmoreland	Mount Pleasant Township	14.31	23.03	PA 130 – Lycippus	
Westmoreland	Unity Township	20.01	32.20	US 30 (Lincoln Highway) – Greensburg, Ligonier	Interchange
Westmoreland	Derry Township	32.15	51.74	US 22 / US 119 (William Penn Highway)	Northern terminus
1.000 mi = 1.609 km; 1.000 km = 0.621 mi

== PA 982 Truck ==
Pennsylvania Route 982 Truck
- Location: Derry-Derry Township
- Length: 12.4 mi (20.0 km)
- Existed: 2013–present

Pennsylvania Route 982 Truck is a truck route that bypasses a weight restricted bridge over Stony Run where trucks over 32 tons (40 for combination loads) are prohibited. The route follows Industrial Boulevard, PA 981 and US 22/119 through Westmoreland County, Pennsylvania. The route was signed in 2013.

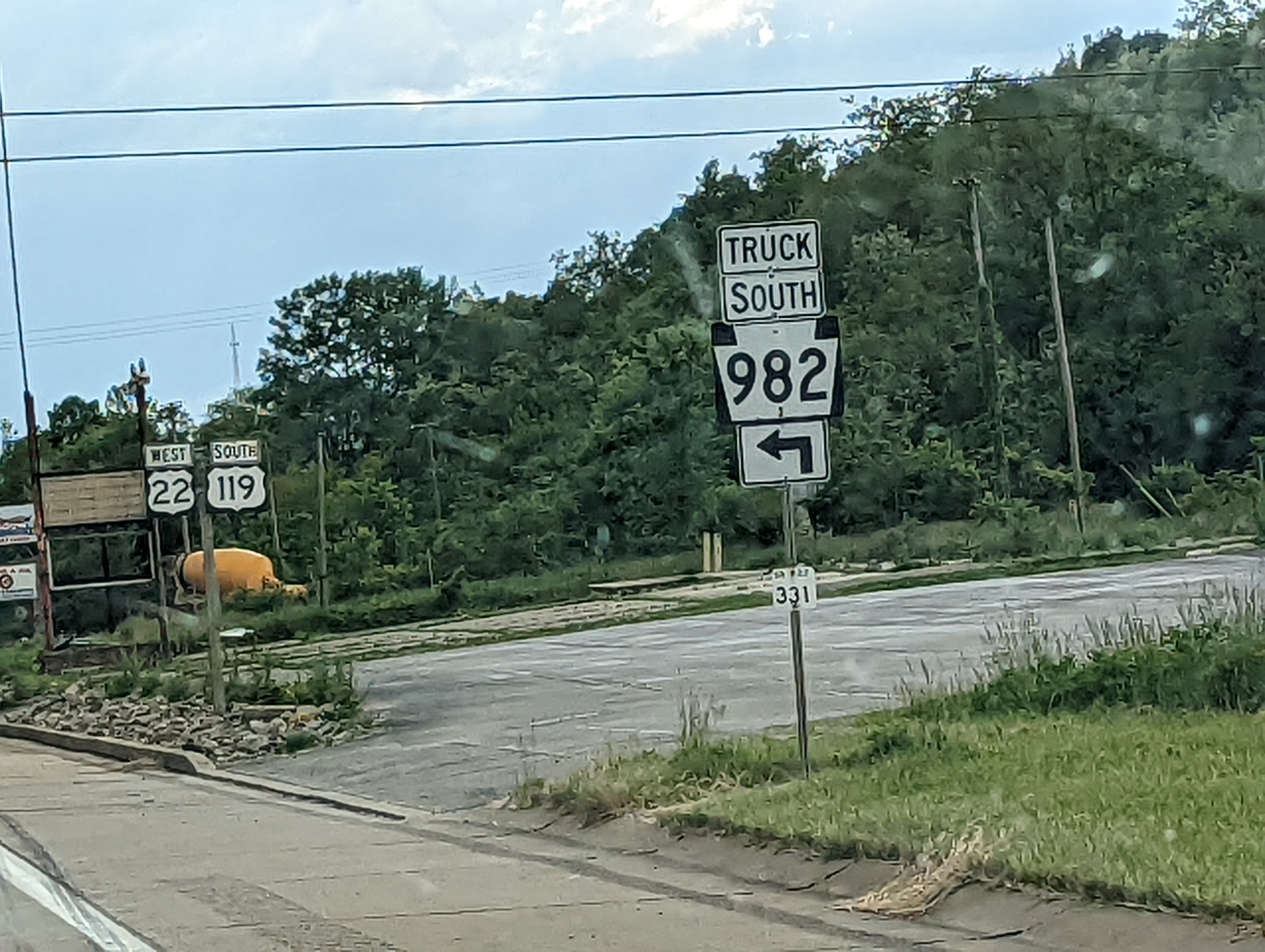
PA 982 Truck southbound leaving US 22/119 and following PA 981 in Westmoreland County.
