= Loyalhanna Township, Pennsylvania =

Township in Pennsylvania, US

Coordinates: 40°28′00″N 79°28′59″W

- Township
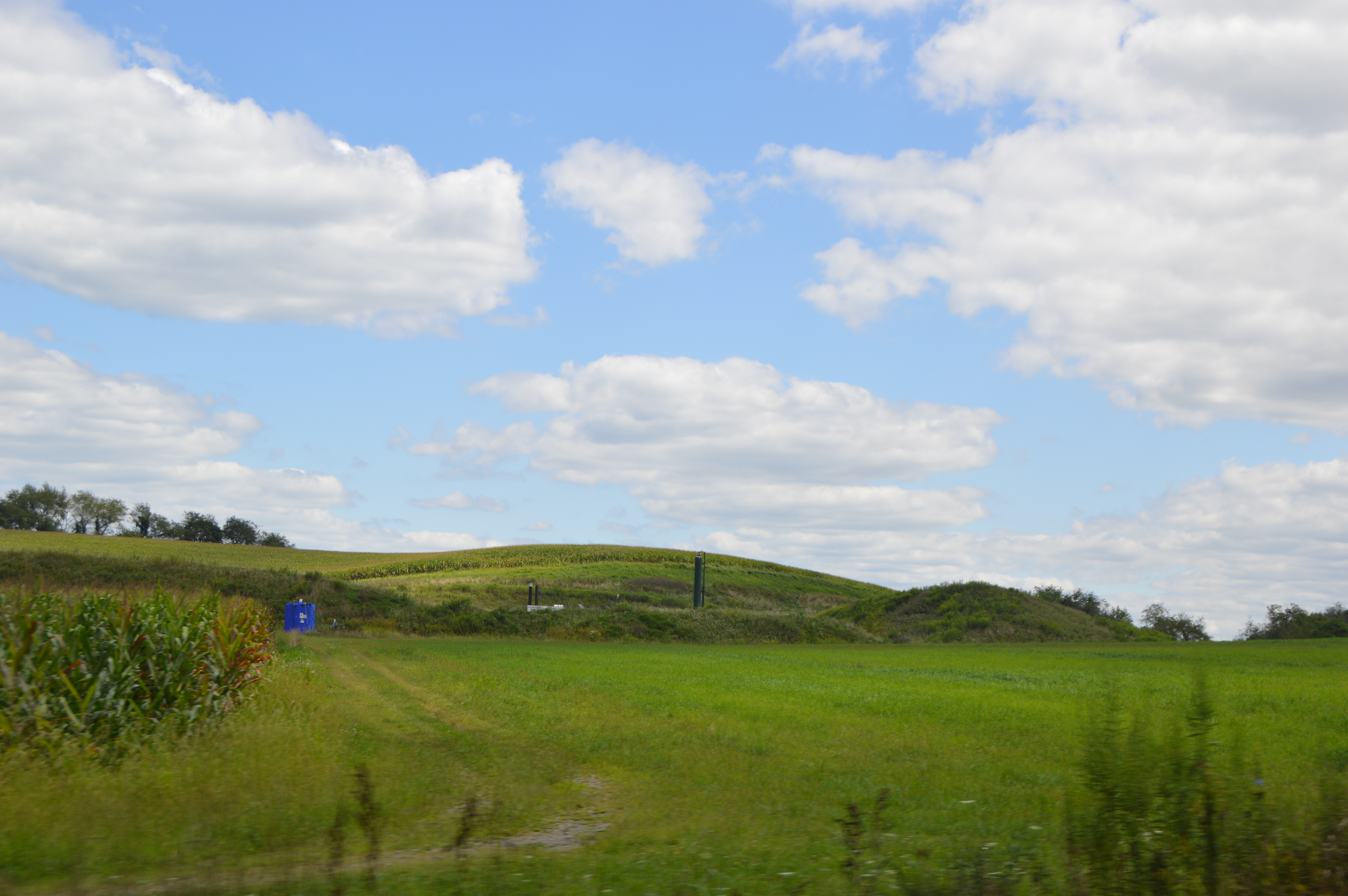
- Fields along Pennsylvania Route 981

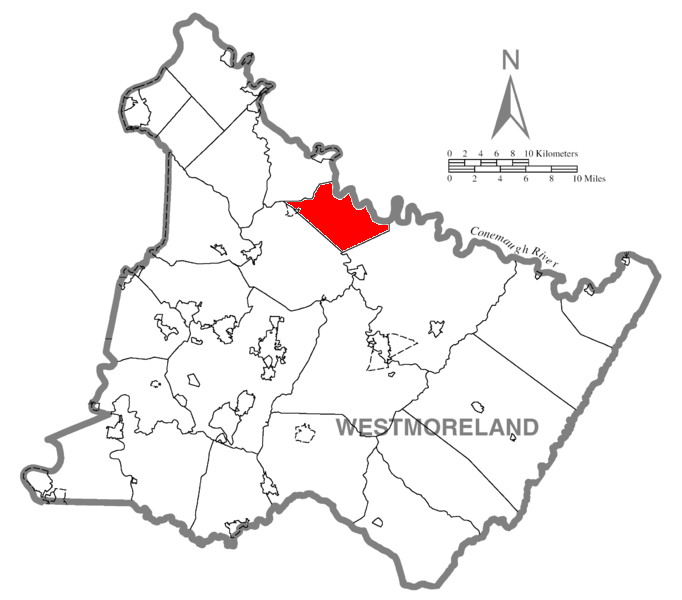
- Map of Westmoreland County, Pennsylvania highlighting Loyalhanna Township

- Map of Pennsylvania highlighting Westmoreland County
- Country: United States
- State: Pennsylvania
- County: Westmoreland
- Incorporated: 1833

Area
  - Total: 22.34 sq mi (57.86 km^{2})
  - Land: 21.57 sq mi (55.86 km^{2})
  - Water: 0.77 sq mi (2.00 km^{2})

Population (2020)
  - Total: 2,093 ▼
  - Estimate (2021): 2,075
  - Density: 106.4/sq mi (41.08/km^{2})
- Time zone: UTC-5 (Eastern (EST))
  - Summer (DST): UTC-4 (EDT)
- FIPS code: 42-129-45200

Loyalhanna Township is a township in northern Westmoreland County, Pennsylvania, United States. It is separate and apart from Loyalhanna, an unincorporated census-designated place (CDP) in Derry Township, Westmoreland County, Pennsylvania.

As of the 2020 census, the township's total population was 2,093.

== History ==
Once part of Derry Township, which lies to the south, Loyalhanna Township derives its name from Loyalhanna Creek, which runs through the township. Early settlers included American Revolutionary War veteran Joseph Bullman, who lived "at the woolen factory close by the Fennel church."

Population: Early Years
Year	
1840	1,126
1850	1,258
1860	850
1870	813
1880	818
1890	930
1900	767

In 1848 residents built a one-room log schoolhouse for local children. It was replaced by a brick structure, which still stands and is listed in the National Registry of Historic Places.

Loyalhannah Baptist Church, torn down in 1928, was adjacent to the now-disused Loyalhannah Baptist Cemetery.

The Keystone Coal Company operated a coal mine in the area around 1905, and opened a second mine around 1915. The company built houses and a company store to accommodate its employees. A bridge (no longer in existence) across the Kiskimentas River led from the houses to the mines. These mines (both known as "Moween") employed as many as 400 miners in the 1930s, and remained open, albeit with fewer miners, until the 1950s.

The name "Moween" survives in a neighborhood in the northern part of the town. A 1994 survey found that many of the miners' houses had been demolished, although the former manager's home remained in good condition and was deemed to be "one of the most elaborate of those found in the region's coal towns." In 2021 the former company store building was being used as an office for a roofing company.

== Geography ==
According to the United States Census Bureau, the township has a total area of 21.9 square miles (56.7 km^{2}), of which 19.9 square miles (51.6 km^{2}) is land and 2.0 square miles (5.1 km^{2}) is water.

The Conemaugh River and the Kiskimentas River confluence along the township border to the north and east. Loyalhanna Lake, a large reservoir, is located within the township. The Conemaugh Dam lies downstream near Saltsburg.

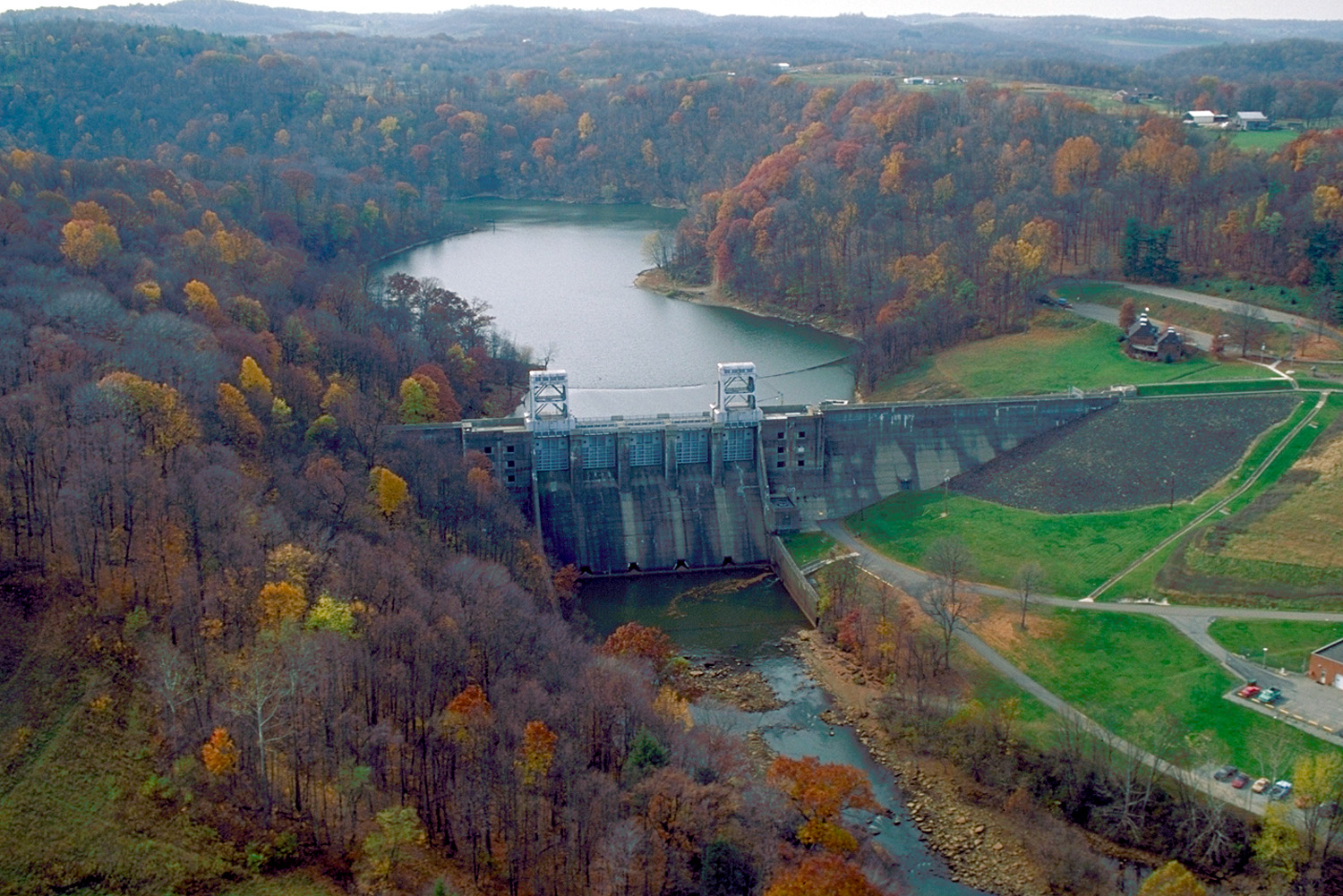
Loyalhanna Lake and Conemaugh Dam

== Environmental Issues ==
The township is one of a number of Pennsylvania communities whose water supply was contaminated by the construction of the Mariner East II pipeline.

== Demographics ==
Historical population
Census	Pop.	Note	%±
2000	2,301		—
2010	2,382		3.5%
2020	2,088		−12.3%
2024 (est.)	2,054		−1.6%
U.S. Decennial Census

At the 2000 census, 2,301 people, 879 households, and 624 families lived in the township. The population density was 115.4 inhabitants per square mile (44.6/km^{2}). There were 964 housing units at an average density of 48.4 per square mile (18.7/km^{2}). The racial makeup of the township was 98.57% White, 0.65% African American, 0.04% Native American, 0.04% Asian, 0.00% Pacific Islander, 0.09% from other races, and 0.61% from two or more races. 0.78% of the population were Hispanic or Latino of any race.

There were 879 households, of which 32.7% had children under 18 living with them, 57.7% were married couples, 9.3% had a female householder with no husband present, and 29.0% were non-families. 23.4% of households were one person, and 10.1% were one person aged 65 or older. The average household size was 2.62, and the average family size was 3.12.

The age distribution was 25.7% under 18, 7.0% from 18 to 24, 29.6% from 25 to 44, 25.6% from 45 to 64, and 12.0% 65 or older. The median age was 38 years. For every 100 females, there were 104.4 males. For every 100 females aged 18 and over, there were 101.5 males.

The median household income was $33,561, and the median family income was $35,441. Males had a median income of $30,565 versus $22,625 for females. The per capita income for the township was $15,136. About 12.6% of the population and 11.0% of families were below the poverty line. 16.4% of those under 18 and 10.4% of those 65 and older lived below the poverty line.
