= Hillside, Pennsylvania =

Unincorporated community in Pennsylvania, US

- Unincorporated community
- Location within Pennsylvania
- Coordinates: 40°22′05″N 79°15′38″W
- Country: United States
- State: Pennsylvania
- County: Westmoreland
- Elevation: 1,148 ft (350 m)
- Time zone: UTC-5 (Eastern (EST))
  - Summer (DST): UTC-4 (EDT)
- ZIP code: 15627
- Area codes: 724, 878
- GNIS feature ID: 1177111

Hillside is an unincorporated community in Derry Township, Westmoreland County, Pennsylvania, United States. The community is located along Pennsylvania Route 217 3.5 miles (5.6 km) northwest of Derry. Hillside does not have a post office.

== Geography ==
Hillside is located in Derry Township in northeastern Westmoreland County 40°22′05″N 79°15′38″W (40.368056, -79.260556). It lies on the west side of Chestnut Ridge.

== Surrounding communities ==
- Derry (southwest)
- New Derry (southwest)
- Blairsville (north)
- Torrance (northeast)
