= Loyalhanna Lake =

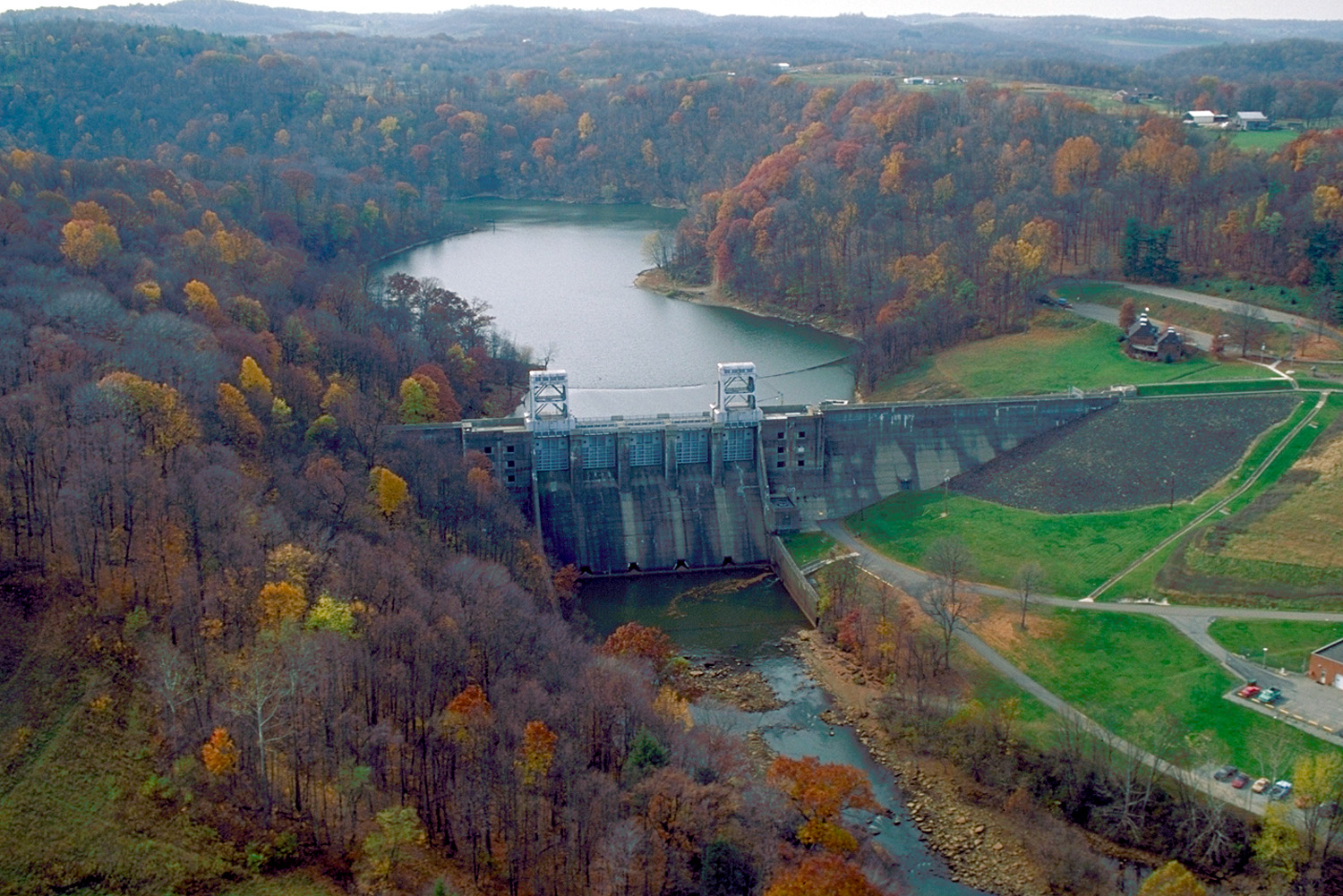
- Loyalhanna Lake and Dam on Loyalhanna Creek in Westmoreland County, Pennsylvania, looking upriver toward the west-northwest

Location
- State: Pennsylvania
- County: Westmoreland
- Township: Loyalhanna

Physical characteristics
- Mouth
  - coordinates: 40°27′24″N 79°27′06″W
  - elevation: 919 feet (280 m)

Basin features
- River system: Allegheny River
- GNIS Identifier: 1180051

Loyalhanna Lake is a reservoir of about 480 acres on Loyalhanna Creek located in Loyalhanna Township, Westmoreland County near Saltsburg. The U.S. Army Corps of Engineers operates the dam that forms the lake.

== See also ==
- List of rivers of Pennsylvania
- List of tributaries of the Allegheny River
