= Torrance, Pennsylvania =

Unincorporated community in Pennsylvania, US

- Unincorporated community
- Location within Pennsylvania
- Coordinates: 40°25′02″N 79°13′22″W
- Country: United States
- State: Pennsylvania
- County: Westmoreland
- Elevation: 1,165 ft (355 m)
- Time zone: UTC-5 (Eastern (EST))
  - Summer (DST): UTC-4 (EDT)
- ZIP code: 15779
- Area code: 724
- GNIS feature ID: 1189666

Torrance is an unincorporated community in Derry Township, Westmoreland County, Pennsylvania, United States. The community is located on the south side of the Conemaugh River, 2.2 miles (3.5 km) east of Blairsville. Torrance has a post office, with ZIP code 15779.
