= Powdermill Run (White Oak Run tributary) =

Stream in Pennsylvania, USA

Powdermill Run Tributary to White Oak Run
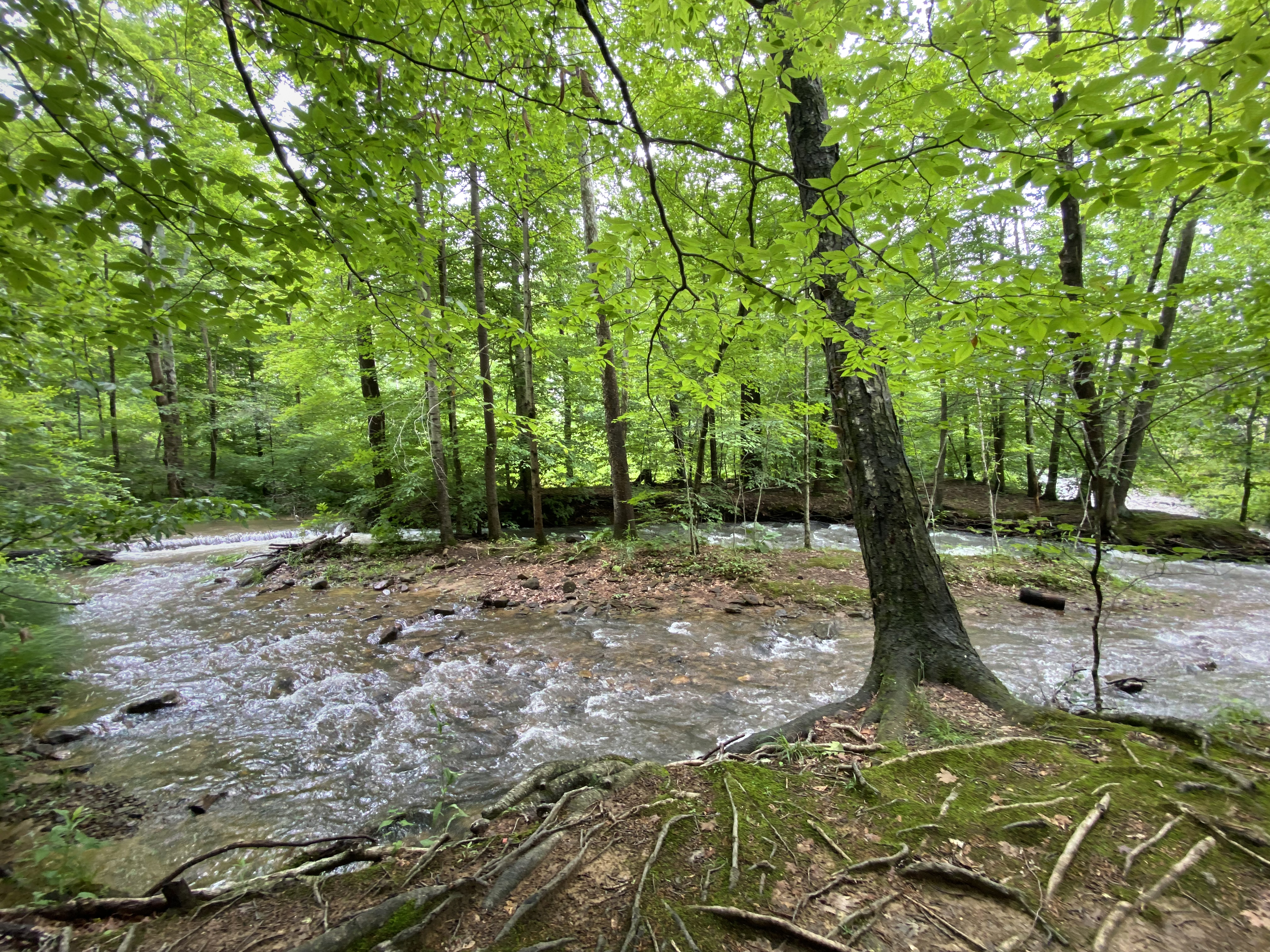
- Powdermill Run flowing through Powdermill Nature Reserve

- Location of Powdermill Run mouth Powdermill Run (White Oak Run tributary) (the United States)

Location
- Country: United States
- State: Pennsylvania
- County: Westmoreland

Physical characteristics
- Source: Linn Run/Clear Run divide
  - location: about 1 mile west of Bald Knob
  - coordinates: 40°07′05″N 079°13′31″W
  - elevation: 2,370 ft (720 m)
- Mouth: White Oak Run
  - location: about 0.25 miles southwest of Weaver Mill, Pennsylvania
  - coordinates: 40°10′21″N 079°16′08″W
  - elevation: 1,332 ft (406 m)
- Length: 4.36 mi (7.02 km)
- Basin size: 4.22 square miles (10.9 km^{2})
- Discharge
  - location: White Oak Run
  - average: 10.20 cu ft/s (0.289 m^{3}/s) at mouth with White Oak Run

Basin features
- Progression: northwest
- River system: Loyalhanna Creek
- Tributaries
  - left: unnamed tributaries
  - right: unnamed tributaries

Powdermill Run is a 4.36 mi (7.02 km) long 2nd order tributary to White Oak Run in Westmoreland County, Pennsylvania. This stream passes through Powdermill Nature Reserve, the field station of the Carnegie Museum of Natural History.

== Variant names ==
According to the Geographic Names Information System, it has also been known historically as:

- Powder Mill Creek
- Powder Mill Run
- Powdermill Creek
- Tributary No.1 to White Oak Run

== Course ==
Powdermill Run rises on the Linn Run/Clear Run divide about 1 mile west of Bald Knob in Westmoreland County. Powdermill Run then flows northwest to meet White Oak Run about 0.25 miles southwest of Weaver Mill, Pennsylvania.

== Watershed ==
Powdermill Run drains 4.22 square miles (10.9 km^{2}) of area, receives about 52.1 in/year of precipitation, has a topographic wetness index of 359.94, and has an average water temperature of 8.58 °C. The watershed is 99% forested.
