= White Oak Run =

White Oak Run may refer to:

- A former name for Archbald, Pennsylvania
- White Oak Run (Lackawanna River)
- White Oak Run (Roaring Brook)
- White Oak Run (Loyalhanna Creek tributary), a stream in Westmoreland County, Pennsylvania
