= Livermore, Pennsylvania =

Abandoned town in Pennsylvania, U.S.

Coordinates: 40°27′42″N 79°19′59″W

Livermore, Pennsylvania is an abandoned town that was located on the Conemaugh River between Blairsville and Saltsburg in Derry Township, Westmoreland County, Pennsylvania. The town was abandoned and partially razed in the early 1950s following authorization by the Flood Control Act of 1936 and Flood Control Act of 1938 for construction of the Conemaugh Dam and Lake to prevent flooding of Pittsburgh. Much of the former town site now lies under the reservoir and floodplains.

== History ==
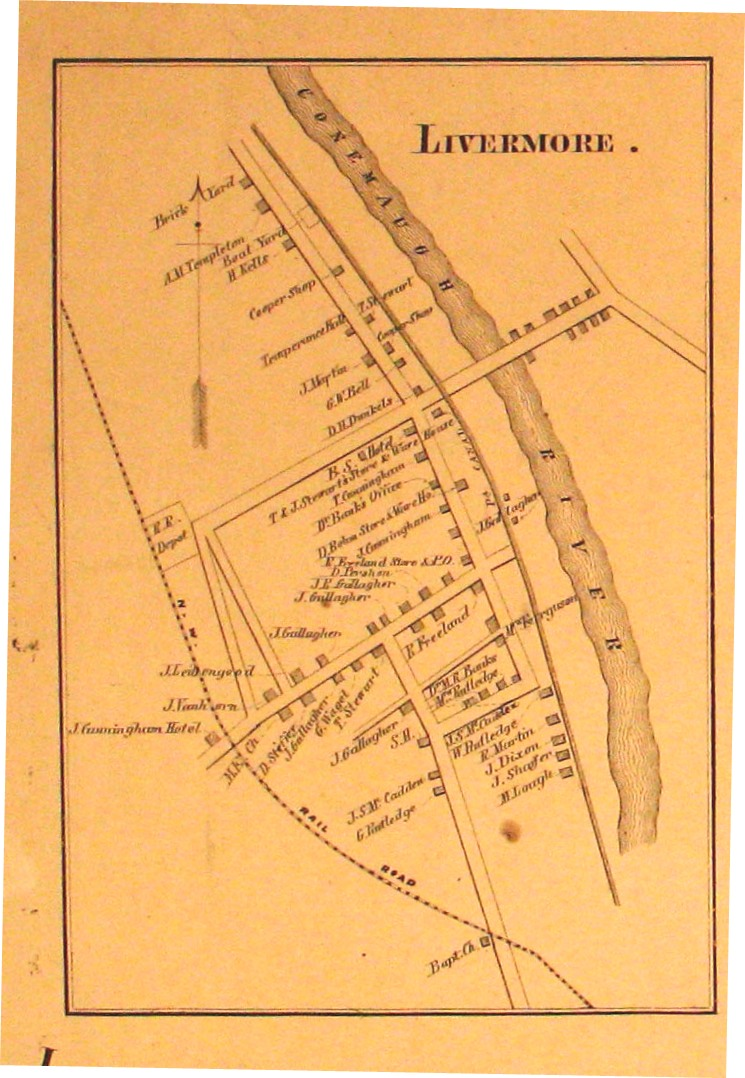
Map of Livermore published in the Westmoreland County Atlas, 1876

The town was established along the Conemaugh River within Derry Township in 1827 by John Livermore, naming the town after himself. The Pennsylvania legislature had established the Board of Canal Commissioners for the Commonwealth in 1825, and authorized a public canal and railroad project across the state, the Pennsylvania Canal system. The Main Line Canal's Western Division, which stretched 103 miles from Johnstown to Pittsburgh, was constructed past Livermore along the Conemaugh.

The West Penn Railroad extended past Livermore alongside the canal in 1854, and a station was built in 1864, providing connections to Blairsville and Saltsburg. Grading from Blairsville to the Allegheny River was completed in 1857, and the same year, the state sold the canal to the Pennsylvania Railroad. Another grade was built in 1882 to bypass a hill. These tracks were used for 25 years until 1907, when a new straight line bypassed the canal curves. A new station was also built.

With the growth of the canal, the town increased slightly. On February 13, 1865, the town was incorporated as a borough within the township, by the county courts. The Livermore Presbyterian Church was organized in 1851, though the congregation seldom met for lack of supplies, and ministers frequently shared time between Livermore and the congregation in nearby Salem. The first church structure was a frame that the Baptists and Presbyterians shared. A more solid brick structure was built in 1862. In 1906, the town had several stores and three churches with Presbyterian, Methodist, and United Brethren congregations. It had one school that served thirty-two students.

The Johnstown Flood of 1889 rendered the Juniata Branch of the Pennsylvania Canal useless, stranding the Western Division from commerce in the east; canal towns, such as Livermore, began a steady decline.

Between March 16 and 21, 1936, the tributaries of the Allegheny and Monongahela Rivers including the Conemaugh flooded as a result of heavy rainfall and melting snow and ice. The area had been experiencing extremely cold temperatures, and in many places the ground was frozen solid to a depth of four feet: water could not soak into the ground. Residents of Livermore and other low-lying towns Cokeville and Bairdstown were evacuated by rowboats in the evening of March 17, many gathering at higher ground in Blairsville. "The Great St. Patrick’s Day Flood" submerged the town under 18 feet of water, sweeping away the bridge spanning the Conemaugh and fourteen buildings, while others were ruined or severely damaged. Floodwaters destroyed eight homes, four properties, three barns, two garages, and the stocks of both general stores. The flood caused one fatality in Livermore. As a whole, the flood claimed about 80 lives and caused the region over $500 million in damages.

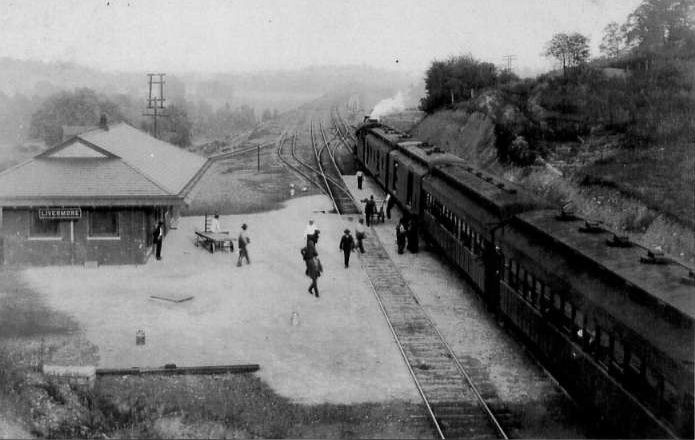
Livermore station of the Pennsylvania Railroad in 1908.

Following the flood, the Flood Control Acts of 1936 and 1938 authorized various flood control projects by the United States Army Corps of Engineers, including the Conemaugh River Dam and Lake at nearby Tunnelton. The project would provide protection for the lower Conemaugh Valley, the Kiskiminetas Valley, the lower Allegheny Valley and the upper Ohio River. The dam would restrict the river's flow, creating a floodplain that would submerge Livermore. The project required the town to be demolished and the 57 remaining residents were relocated. Since completion in 1952, the Conemaugh River Dam has prevented over $2 billion in damage. $375 million in damage was prevented when the remnants of Hurricane Ivan struck the area in 2004.

== Demographics ==
The 1850 United States census was the first to publish populations for civil divisions below counties. Livermore recorded an all-white population of 153 in 1850, and 165 in 1860. The 1870 Census recorded that Livermore, Pennsylvania had 209 native-born residents, and 2 foreigners, with 208 whites and 3 blacks, for a total population of 211. The 1880 Census recorded a significant decline in the population to 164, attributed to the decline of the Pennsylvania Canal. However, the population increased again to 211 in 1890, but again saw decline to 175 in 1900. Following the severe flood in 1936, the population declined to 113 in 1940, and 57 in 1950 before the town was condemned and abandoned.

== Today ==
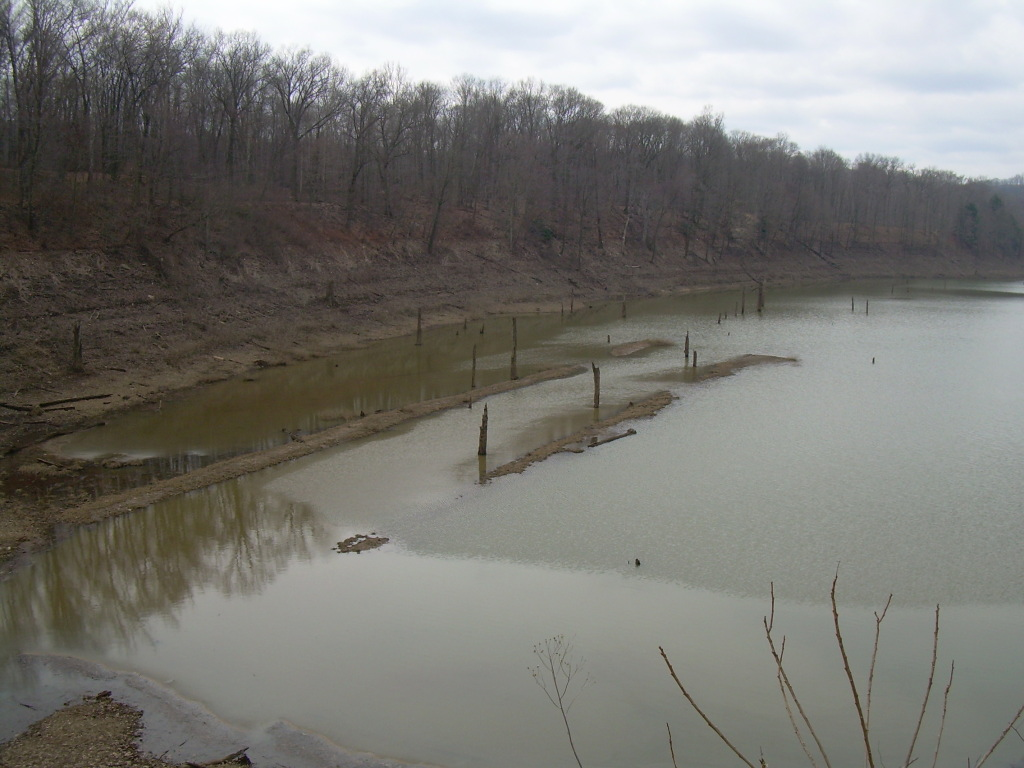
Remnants of the Mainline Canal alongside the Conemaugh River.

Several urban legends surround the former town. One claims that the town was wiped out in a flood. While the site is now underwater, the buildings of the small town were condemned and torn down before the dam was built and the area was flooded in 1952. Another belief is that George A. Romero’s cult horror film Night of the Living Dead was filmed at the Livermore Cemetery. The cemetery scenes were filmed in Evans City, Pennsylvania, more than 60 miles from Livermore. The site is nonetheless considered haunted, and the stories primarily center around the moving of graves that occurred when the town's cemetery was required to be moved to higher ground. The cemetery was not relocated, however, and has always been in its present location. Due to repeated vandalism, access to the cemetery is now restricted.

== See also ==
- List of ghost towns in Pennsylvania
