= Samuel Patterson House =

Historic house in Pennsylvania, United States

- U.S. National Register of Historic Places
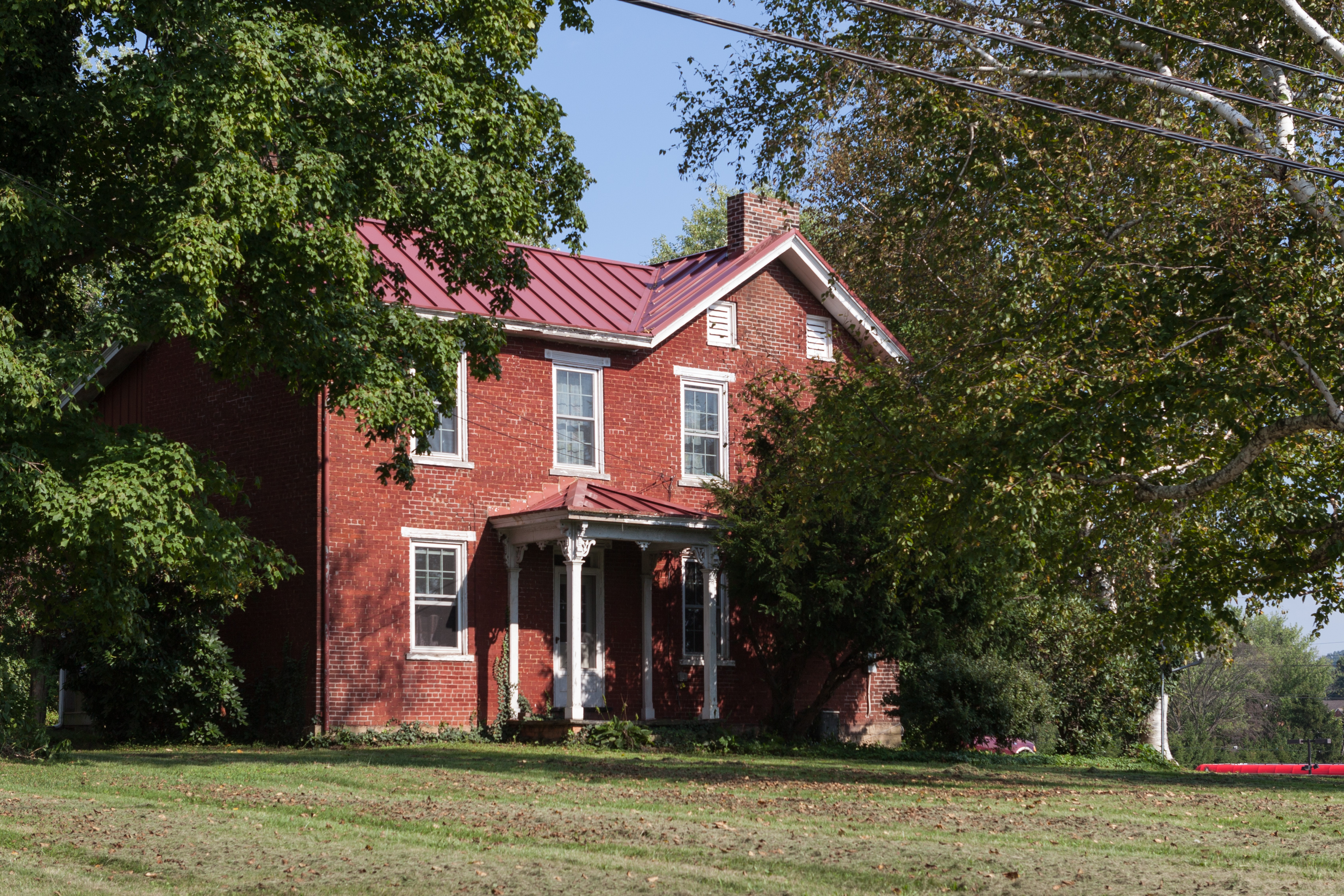
- North and west sides, seen from Route 981, September 2014

- Location within Pennsylvania Location within the United States
- Location: Pennsylvania Route 981, north of New Alexandria, Derry Township, Pennsylvania
- Coordinates: 40°23′58″N 79°25′20″W
- Area: 2.4 acres (0.97 ha)
- Built: 1846
- Built by: Samuel Patterson
- Architectural style: Greek Revival
- NRHP reference No.: 85000472
- Added to NRHP: March 7, 1985

The Samuel Patterson House is an historic home that is located in Derry Township, Westmoreland County, Pennsylvania, United States.

It was added to the National Register of Historic Places in 1985.

== History and architectural features ==
This house was built in 1846, and is a two-story, five-bay, brick, vernacular dwelling with Greek Revival-style details. It has a gable roof and two nineteenth-century Victorian porches supported by square columns.
