= Saltsburg Historic District =

Historic district in Pennsylvania, United States

- U.S. National Register of Historic Places
- U.S. Historic district
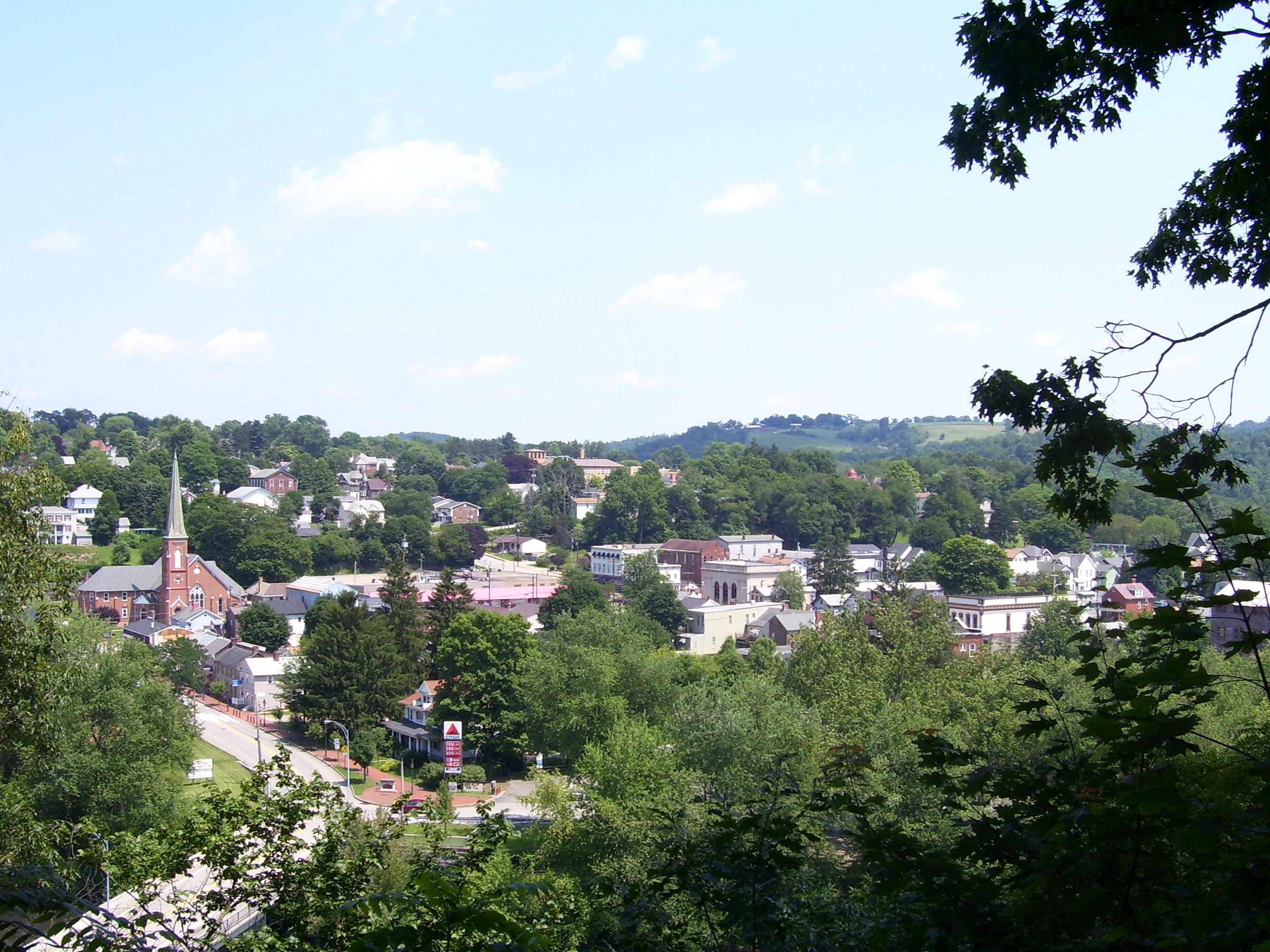
- Saltsburg, July 2006

- Location within Pennsylvania Location within the United States
- Location: Roughly, W of Plum and Walnut Alleys to Kiskiminetas R., Saltsburg, Pennsylvania
- Coordinates: 40°29′2″N 79°27′4″W
- Area: 48 acres (19 ha)
- Built: 1829
- Architectural style: Late Victorian, Federal, Canal Vernacular
- NRHP reference No.: 92000386
- Added to NRHP: May 7, 1992

The Saltsburg Historic District is a national historic district located in Saltsburg, Indiana County, Pennsylvania.

It was listed on the National Register of Historic Places in 1992.

== History and architectural features ==
This district encompasses 118 contributing buildings, one contributing site, one contributing structure, and fifteen contributing objects that are located in the central business district and surrounding residential areas of Saltsburg, including notable examples of buildings that were designed in the Federal and Late Victorian styles. Most of the buildings were built between the 1830s and 1880s.

Notable buildings include the William McIlwaine House and Store (1820–1829), the Dr. James Crawford House (1830–1839), Dr. McFarland's Drug Store and Office (1840), the Saltsburg Hotel (1870s), the Western Pennsylvania Railroad Station (1864), the Saltsburg Presbyterian Church (1874), the Sons of Zebedee Evangelical Lutheran Church (1878), the Altman Feed Mill (1893), the First National Bank Building (1927), and the DeLisi Theater (1923).

The contributing site is a former canal/railbed of the Western Pennsylvania Railroad and Lock #8, now occupied by Canal Park. The contributing structures are the railroad's retaining walls. The contributing objects are canal markers.

It was listed on the National Register of Historic Places in 1992.

== Gallery ==
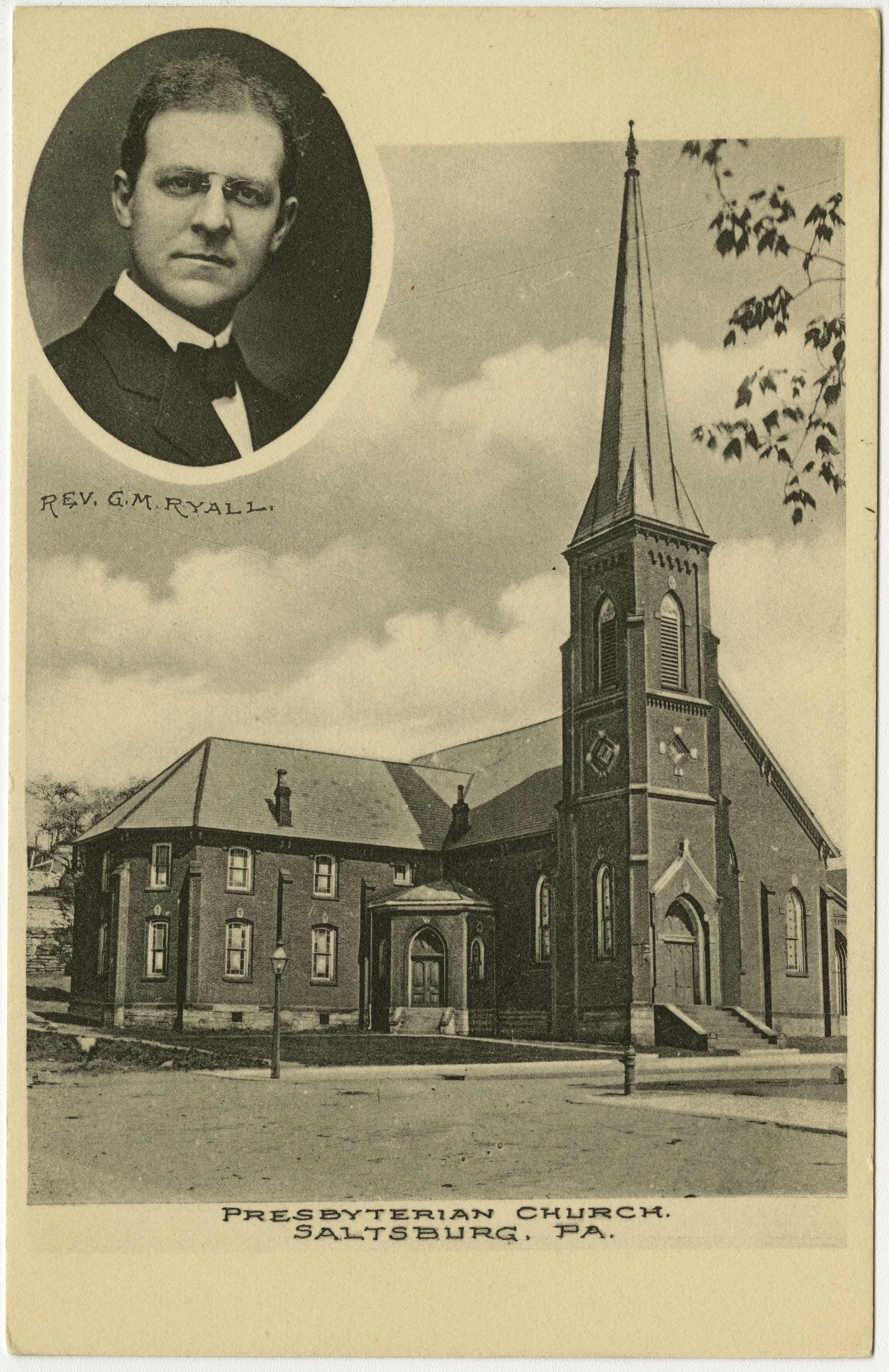
Saltsburg Presbyterian Church
