= Derry Township, Westmoreland County, Pennsylvania =

Township in Pennsylvania, US

Coordinates: 40°23′00″N 79°13′59″W

- Township
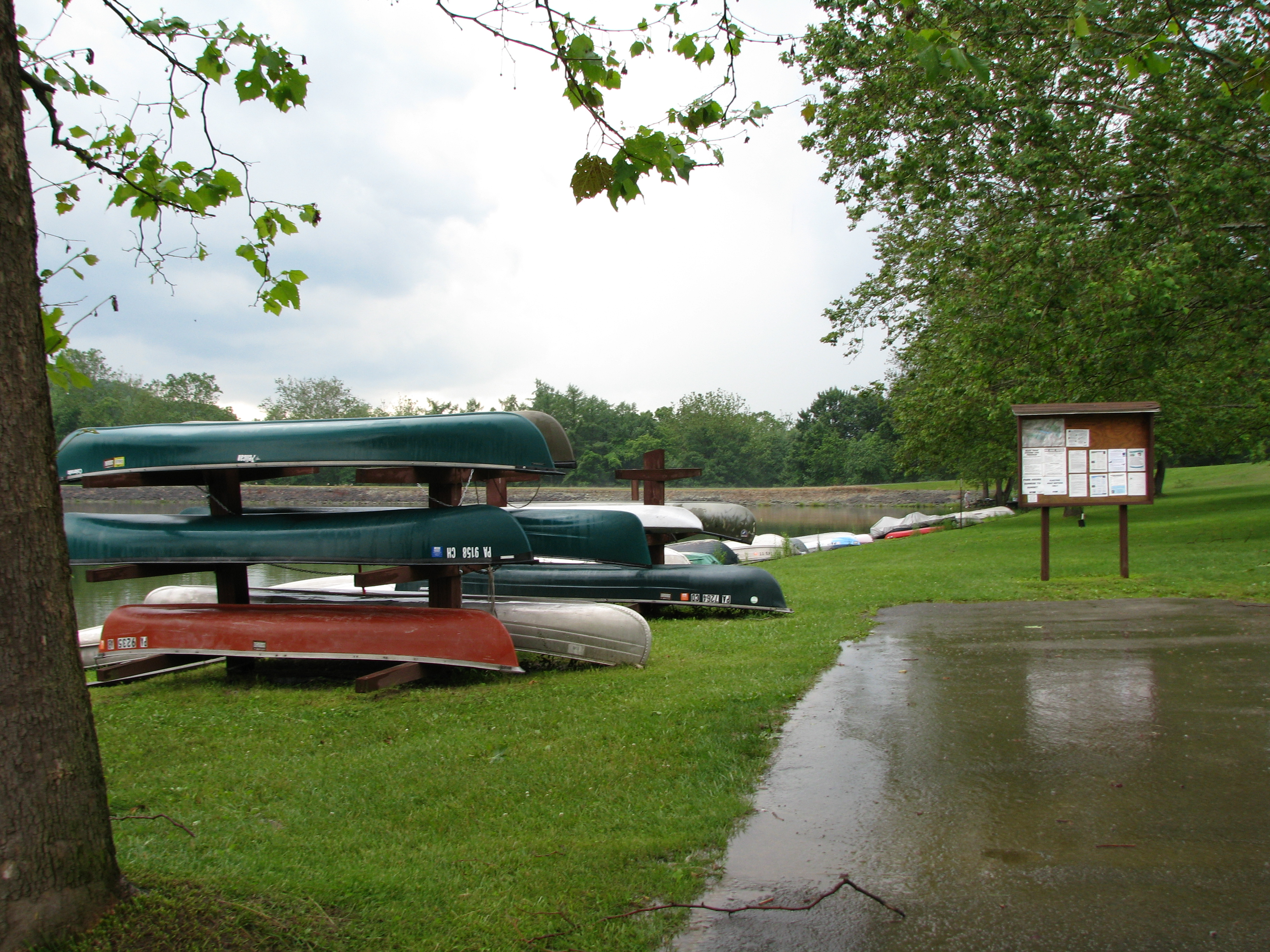
- Keystone State Park is in Derry Township

- Logo

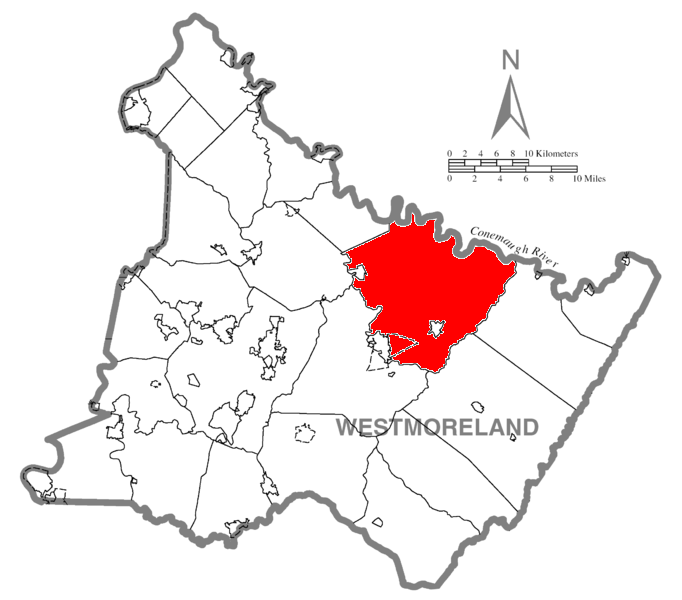
- Map of Westmoreland County, Pennsylvania Highlighting Derry Township

- Map of Pennsylvania highlighting Westmoreland County
- Country: United States
- State: Pennsylvania
- County: Westmoreland
- Settled: 1763
- Incorporated: 1775
- Named for: Derry

Area
  - Total: 96.29 sq mi (249.40 km^{2})
  - Land: 95.57 sq mi (247.53 km^{2})
  - Water: 0.72 sq mi (1.87 km^{2})

Population (2020)
  - Total: 13,631
  - Density: 142.6/sq mi (55.07/km^{2})
- Time zone: UTC-5 (Eastern (EST))
  - Summer (DST): UTC-4 (EDT)
- FIPS code: 42-129-18968
- Website: http://www.derrytownship.com

Derry Township is a township in Westmoreland County, Pennsylvania, United States. It surrounds the borough of Derry, which is a separate municipality. As of the 2020 census, the township population was 13,631.

It was named after the city of Derry by Scots-Irish settlers.

== History ==
The township was formally incorporated in 1775. Prior to incorporation, the first known settlers arrived: former soldiers from Brigadier-General John Forbes army. John Pomroy, a man of Scots-Irish descent, was one of the early arrivals. He lived near present-day New Derry. Later, James Wilson settled nearby. One winter, a few years after settling in Derry Township, Pomroy and Wilson returned to their homes in the East. When they returned, each brought with him a wife. Pomroy married Isabel Barr. Later, her father and two of her brothers, along with William Guthrie and Richard Wallace and others, migrated to Derry township.

Sometime in the 1770s, Fort Barr and Fort Wallace were built to protect the citizens from Indian attacks. Other dangers that early settlers faced included bears, panthers and foxes. Derry is said to be the site of the last Indian attack in Westmoreland County, which took place in 1791 on the Mitchell family's land "two miles east of Latrobe along the line of the Ligonier Valley railroad." One of the Mitchell children was captured and lived with the Indians for three years. He later returned to Derry.

Torrance State Hospital (established in 1919) and Keystone State Park (1945) are located in the township.

The Samuel Patterson House was added to the National Register of Historic Places in 1985.

== Geography ==
According to the United States Census Bureau, the township has a total area of 96.3 square miles (249 km^{2}), of which 95.6 square miles (248 km^{2}) is land and 0.7 square miles (1.8 km^{2}) (0.75%) is water.

The township contains the following communities: Andrico, Andrico No. 2, Atlantic, Bairdstown, Bradenville, Brenizer, Hillside, Loyalhanna, Cokeville Heights, Cooperstown, Kingston, Mannitto Haven, McChesneytown, Millwood, New Derry, Osburn, Pandora, Peanut, Seger, Snydertown, Superior, Torrance, and West Derry.

The villages of Livermore and Cokeville no longer exist, relocated as part of the Conemaugh Dam Flood Control project.

To the west lie Unity Township, Latrobe, and Salem Township and New Alexandria; to the north lie Loyalhanna Township, Conemaugh Township, Black Lick Township, Burrell Township and Blairsville; to the east, Fairfield Township; and to the south, Ligonier Township.

Derry borough is entirely situated within Derry Township.

It is traversed by the William Penn Highway (US-22 / US-119 concurrency) across the northern half of the township. US-30 runs along the southern border.

The Chestnut Ridge makes up the southeastern border that meets both Fairfield and Ligonier Townships.

The Loyalhanna Creek makes up the southern and eastern borders with Unity Township, Latrobe and Salem Township.

The Conemaugh River makes up the northern border with Burrel Township, Blairsville, Black Lick Township and Conemaugh Township.

Bear Cave, a natural maze of caverns, is located in Derry Township. Accounts of it appeared in local newspapers as early as 1839. Some 8,500 feet of passages have been mapped.

== Government ==
The township is classed as a township of the second class of the Commonwealth of Pennsylvania. A three-person board of supervisors, elected for a six-year term, governs the township.

== Public Services ==
Water is provided by a variety of sources depending on where one lives in the township including, the Municipal Authority of the Borough of Derry, the Highridge Water Authority, the Latrobe Municipal Authority, or the Municipal Authority of Westmoreland County. Likewise, sewage is also provided by a variety of sources depending on where one lives in the township including, the Municipal Authority of the Borough of Derry, the Derry Township Municipal Authority, the Latrobe Municipal Authority. Fire protection services are provided by the Derry Township VFD Co.1 of Bradenville.

== Industry and Commerce ==
Coal mining and coking in the township included:

- Superior Coal & Coke Company Mines No. 1 and No. 2, owned and operated by Marcus W. Saxman;
- Seger Mine No. 1 (on Seger Road near Millwood),
- Latrobe-Connellsville Coal & Coke Company's Peanut and Ligonier No. 2 Mines
- Loyalhanna Mines Nos. 1 and 2 and Pandora Shaft; and
- Superior Coal and Coal Company Atlantic Mines No. 1 and 2 (Snydertown).

All of these facilities are now closed.

== Demographics ==
Historical population
| Census | Pop. | Note | %± |
|---|---|---|---|
| 1990 | 15,446 | | — |
| 2000 | 14,726 | | −4.7% |
| 2010 | 14,502 | | −1.5% |
| 2020 | 13,631 | | −6.0% |

As of the census of 2000, there were 14,726 people, 5,716 households, and 4,201 families residing in the township. The population density was 153.6 inhabitants per square mile (59.3/km^{2}). There were 6,200 housing units at an average density of 64.7 per square mile (25.0/km^{2}). The racial makeup of the township was 98.21% White, 1.18% African American, 0.14% Asian, 0.03% Native American, 0.01% Pacific Islander, 0.05% from other races, and 0.37% from two or more races. Hispanic or Latino of any race were 0.47% of the population.

There were 5,716 households, out of which 29.8% had children under the age of 18 living with them, 58.9% were married couples living together, 10.1% had a female householder with no husband present, and 26.5% were non-families. 23.2% of all households were made up of individuals, and 11.0% had someone living alone who was 65 years of age or older. The average household size was 2.48 and the average family size was 2.91.

In the township the population was spread out, with 22.2% under the age of 18, 6.7% from 18 to 24, 28.3% from 25 to 44, 26.0% from 45 to 64, and 16.7% who were 65 years of age or older. The median age was 41 years. For every 100 females, there were 97.9 males. For every 100 females age 18 and over, there were 94.8 males.

The median income for a household in the township was $34,208, and the median income for a family was $40,878. Males had a median income of $32,589 versus $22,147 for females. The per capita income for the township was $16,425. About 8.3% of families and 10.1% of the population were below the poverty line, including 14.5% of those under age 18 and 5.5% of those age 65 or over.
