= Moyer, Pennsylvania =

Unincorporated community in Pennsylvania, US

- Unincorporated community
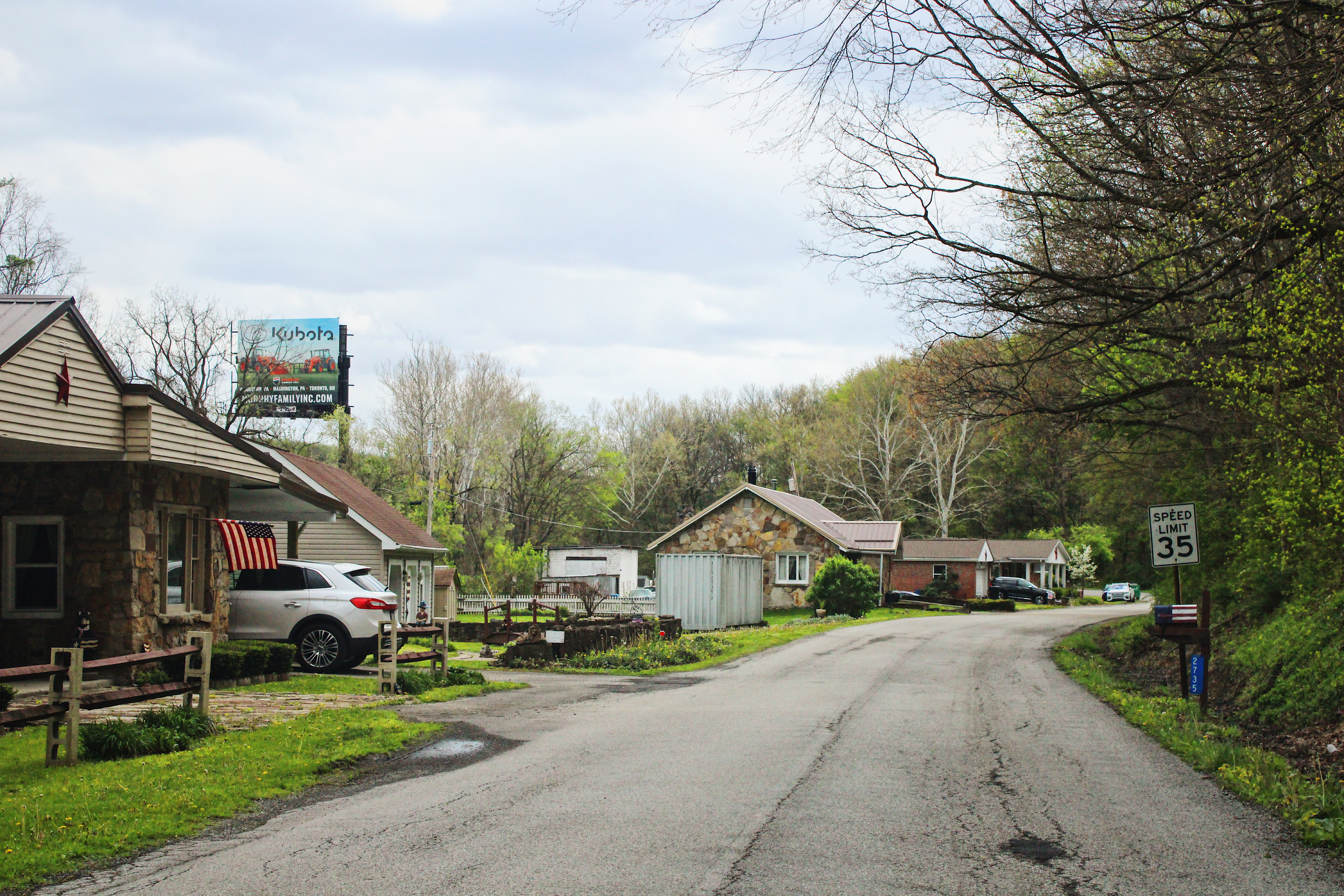
- Moyer Road

- Location within Pennsylvania Location within the United States
- Coordinates: 40°02′58″N 79°33′56″W
- Country: United States
- State: Pennsylvania
- County: Fayette
- Township: Bullskin
- Elevation: 945 ft (288 m)
- Time zone: UTC-5 (Eastern (EST))
  - Summer (DST): UTC-4 (EDT)
- Area code: 724
- GNIS feature ID: 1181988

Moyer is an unincorporated community in Fayette County, Pennsylvania, United States. The community is located along U.S. Route 119 near its intersection with Pennsylvania Route 982, 2.5 miles (4.0 km) north-northeast of Connellsville.
