= Loyalhanna, Pennsylvania =

Unincorporated community in Pennsylvania, US

- Census-designated place
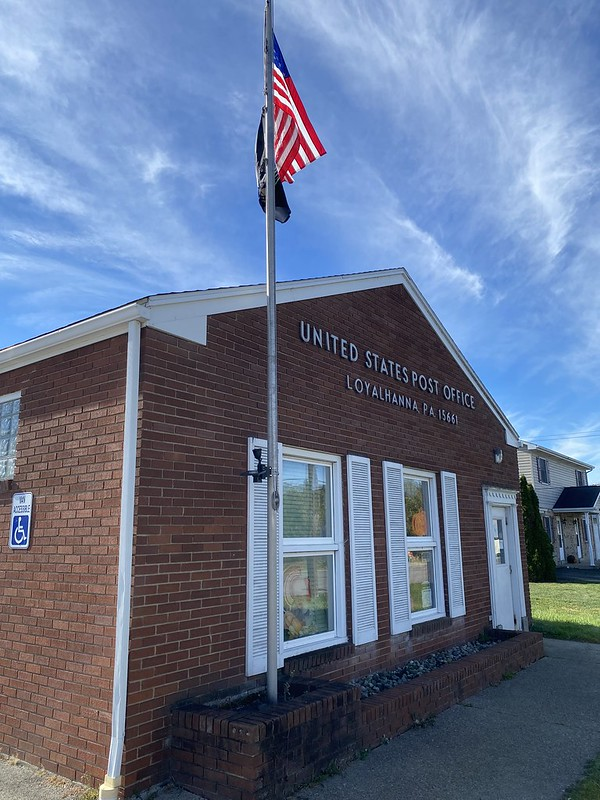
- US Post Office, Loyalhanna, Pennsylvania

- Location within the U.S. state of Pennsylvania Loyalhanna, Pennsylvania (the United States)
- Coordinates: 40°18′51″N 79°21′41″W
- Country: United States
- State: Pennsylvania
- County: Westmoreland

Area
  - Total: 2.36 sq mi (6.10 km^{2})
  - Land: 2.36 sq mi (6.10 km^{2})
  - Water: 0 sq mi (0.00 km^{2})

Population (2020)
  - Total: 3,409
  - Density: 1,450/sq mi (559/km^{2})
- Time zone: UTC-5 (Eastern (EST))
  - Summer (DST): UTC-4 (EDT)
- ZIP code: 15661
- Area code: 724
- FIPS code: 42-45192

Loyalhanna is a census-designated place (CDP) in Derry Township, Westmoreland County, Pennsylvania, United States. The population was 3,415 at the 2000 census, at which time it was listed as McChesneytown-Loyalhanna. The CDP name was changed to Loyalhanna for the 2010 census. As of the 2020 census the population was 3,409 residents.

It is separate and apart from Loyalhanna Township, which is also in Westmoreland County, Pennsylvania. The community described in this article has its own U.S. post office, established in 1890, and its own zip code, 15661.

== Geography ==
Loyalhanna is located at 40°18′51″N 79°21′41″W (40.314197, -79.361280).

According to the United States Census Bureau, the CDP has a total area of 2.3 square miles (6.0 km^{2}), all land. It is one of the areas comprising the Saxman Run Watershed, a region impacted by underground and surface mining.

== Demographics ==
Historical population
| Census | Pop. | Note | %± |
|---|---|---|---|
| 2020 | 3,409 | | — |
U.S. Decennial Census

=== 2020 census ===
As of the 2020 census, Loyalhanna had a population of 3,409. The median age was 52.6 years. 14.8% of residents were under the age of 18 and 29.2% of residents were 65 years of age or older. For every 100 females there were 95.1 males, and for every 100 females age 18 and over there were 92.1 males age 18 and over.

96.0% of residents lived in urban areas, while 4.0% lived in rural areas.

There were 1,572 households in Loyalhanna, of which 16.2% had children under the age of 18 living in them. Of all households, 45.0% were married-couple households, 19.3% were households with a male householder and no spouse or partner present, and 29.6% were households with a female householder and no spouse or partner present. About 35.9% of all households were made up of individuals and 18.0% had someone living alone who was 65 years of age or older.

There were 1,697 housing units, of which 7.4% were vacant. The homeowner vacancy rate was 2.2% and the rental vacancy rate was 9.3%.

Racial composition as of the 2020 census
| Race | Number | Percent |
|---|---|---|
| White | 3,249 | 95.3% |
| Black or African American | 32 | 0.9% |
| American Indian and Alaska Native | 5 | 0.1% |
| Asian | 5 | 0.1% |
| Native Hawaiian and Other Pacific Islander | 0 | 0.0% |
| Some other race | 12 | 0.4% |
| Two or more races | 106 | 3.1% |
| Hispanic or Latino (of any race) | 23 | 0.7% |

=== 2000 census ===
As of the 2000 census, there were 3,415 people, 1,464 households, and 1,030 families residing in the CDP. The population density was 1,462.3 inhabitants per square mile (564.6/km^{2}). There were 1,536 housing units at an average density of 657.7 per square mile (253.9/km^{2}). The racial makeup of the CDP was 99.33% White, 0.26% African American, 0.03% Native American, 0.18% Asian, and 0.20% from two or more races. Hispanic or Latino of any race were 0.20% of the population.

There were 1,464 households, out of which 24.7% had children under the age of 18 living with them, 56.4% were married couples living together, 10.0% had a female householder with no husband present, and 29.6% were non-families. 26.4% of all households were made up of individuals, and 14.5% had someone living alone who was 65 years of age or older. The average household size was 2.31 and the average family size was 2.78.

In the CDP, the population was spread out, with 19.7% under the age of 18, 5.8% from 18 to 24, 26.6% from 25 to 44, 26.1% from 45 to 64, and 21.9% who were 65 years of age or older. The median age was 44 years. For every 100 females, there were 92.7 males. For every 100 females age 18 and over, there were 89.0 males.

The median income for a household in the CDP was $34,018, and the median income for a family was $40,845. Males had a median income of $32,292 versus $21,849 for females. The per capita income for the CDP was $18,041. About 6.0% of families and 7.5% of the population were below the poverty line, including 10.7% of those under age 18 and 7.6% of those age 65 or over.

== History ==
Both Loyalhanna Coal & Coke Company and McFeely Brick Company operated in the vicinity and built houses in Loyalhanna for their employees. Loyalhanna Coal & Coke operated coal mines (known as No. 1, No. 2 and Pandora) and a coking facility in the vicinity. Mine #1, located along Saxman Run and the Pennsylvania Railroad, was one of the largest coal producers in Westmoreland County by 1880. None of the mining structures have survived. McFeely Brick was also located near Saxman Run. In 1941, it employed 150 workers. The brickyard was still in business in 1954.

The area's connection with both industries survives in two neighborhood street names: Brick Lane and Pandora Road.

== See also ==
Saxman Run: Natural Atlas
