= Jacksonville, Pennsylvania =

Unincorporated community in Pennsylvania, US

- Census-designated place
- Location within Pennsylvania Location within the United States
- Coordinates: 40°33′37″N 79°17′34″W
- Country: United States
- State: Pennsylvania
- County: Indiana
- Townships: Young, Armstrong, Black Lick

Area
  - Total: 6.8 sq mi (17.5 km^{2})

Population (2010)
  - Total: 637
  - Density: 94.3/sq mi (36.4/km^{2})
- Time zone: UTC-5 (Eastern (EST))
  - Summer (DST): UTC-4 (EDT)

Jacksonville (also known as Kent) is a census-designated place (CDP) in Indiana County, Pennsylvania, United States. The population was 637 at the 2010 census. It was formerly an independent borough, until January 1, 1993, when it was returned to Black Lick Township, Pennsylvania.

Most of it is in Young Township. Parts are in Armstrong and Black Lick townships.

== Geography ==
Jacksonville is located at 40°33′37″N 79°17′34″W (40.560277, -79.292740).

According to the United States Census Bureau, the CDP has a total area of 6.8 square miles (18 km^{2}), of which 6.8 square miles (18 km^{2}) is land and 0.15% is water.

== Demographics ==
As of the census of 2000, there were 675 people, 300 households, and 186 families residing in the CDP. The population density was 100.0 inhabitants per square mile (38.6/km^{2}). There were 331 housing units at an average density of 49.0 per square mile (18.9/km^{2}). The racial makeup of the CDP was 98.52% White, 1.04% African American, 0.15% Native American, and 0.30% from two or more races.

There were 300 households, out of which 24.3% had children under the age of 18 living with them, 48.0% were married couples living together, 8.7% had a female householder with no husband present, and 37.7% were non-families. 34.3% of all households were made up of individuals, and 19.3% had someone living alone who was 65 years of age or older. The average household size was 2.24 and the average family size was 2.89.

In the CDP, the population was spread out, with 20.1% under the age of 18, 9.0% from 18 to 24, 27.0% from 25 to 44, 23.7% from 45 to 64, and 20.1% who were 65 years of age or older. The median age was 41 years. For every 100 females, there were 89.1 males. For every 100 females age 18 and over, there were 87.8 males.

The median income for a household in the CDP was $30,052, and the median income for a family was $39,688. Males had a median income of $33,409 versus $20,469 for females. The per capita income for the CDP was $15,917. About 7.1% of families and 11.0% of the population were below the poverty line, including 15.2% of those under age 18 and 5.0% of those age 65 or over.

== Education ==
The portion in Young Township, that is most of the CDP, is in the Apollo-Ridge School District. The portion in Armstrong Township is in the Indiana Area School District. The portion in Black Lick Township is in the River Valley School District (formerly the Blairsville-Saltsburg School District).
