= Conemaugh Dam =

Dam in Pennsylvania, United States

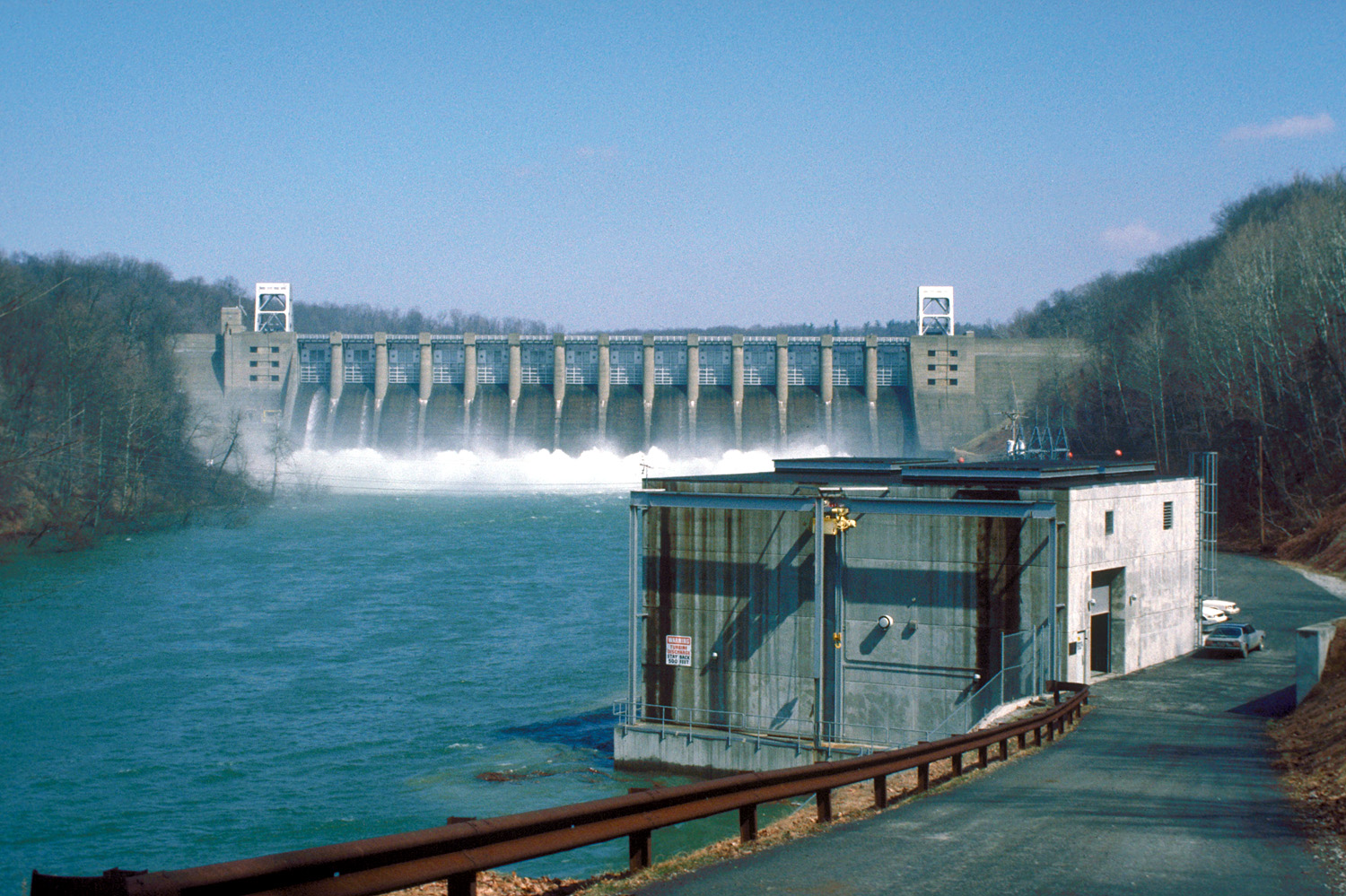

- Location within Pennsylvania
- Country: United States
- Location: Indiana/Westmoreland County, Pennsylvania
- Coordinates: 40°28′05.04″N 79°21′58.44″W
- Purpose: Flood control, power
- Status: Operational
- Opening date: 1952
- Owner: U.S. Army Corps of Engineers

Dam and spillways
- Type of dam: Concrete gravity
- Impounds: Conemaugh River
- Height: 144 ft (44 m)
- Length: 1,266 ft (386 m)

Reservoir
- Creates: Conemaugh River Lake
- Total capacity: 355,000 acre⋅ft (0.438 km^{3})
- Catchment area: 1,351 mi^{2} (3,500 km^{2})

Conemaugh Hydroelectric Station
- Coordinates: 40°27′49.85″N 79°21′57.38″W
- Commission date: 1989
- Turbines: 2 x 7 MW Kaplan-type
- Installed capacity: 14 MW

Conemaugh Dam (also known as Conemaugh River Dam or Conemaugh River Lake Dam) is a concrete gravity dam across the Conemaugh River, near the town of Saltsburg, in Pennsylvania. The dam was authorized by the Flood Control Act of 1936 and completed in 1952 by the U.S. Army Corps of Engineers for flood protection on the Conemaugh, Kiskiminetas, and Allegheny Rivers. The dam is one of 16 flood control structures in the Corps' Pittsburgh District.

With a capacity of 355,000 acre-feet (438,000 dam^{3}), the lake is usually kept at a much lower level of 5,140 acre-feet (6,340 dam^{3}), to accommodate flash floods. Water is released as quickly as possible while not exacerbating flooding conditions downstream. The dam has prevented a total of $2.2 billion of flooding-related damages between 1952 and 2013, including $375 million during 2004's Hurricane Ivan alone. The dam also supplies water to a 14 MW hydroelectric power station which was commissioned in 1989.

Conemaugh Lake Recreation Area is located adjacent to the dam and preserves several historic sites, including segments of the Main Line Canal that once connected Pittsburgh to Philadelphia.

== See also ==
- List of dams and reservoirs in Pennsylvania
