= White Oak Run (Loyalhanna Creek tributary) =

Stream in Pennsylvania, USA

White Oak Run Tributary to Loyalhanna Creek
- Location of White Oak Run mouth White Oak Run (Loyalhanna Creek tributary) (the United States)

Location
- Country: United States
- State: Pennsylvania
- County: Westmoreland

Physical characteristics
- Source: Indian Creek divide
  - location: about 0.25 miles northeast of Kregar, Pennsylvania
  - coordinates: 40°07′33″N 079°18′03″W
  - elevation: 1,740 ft (530 m)
- Mouth: Loyalhanna Creek
  - location: about 0.25 miles north of Weaver Mill, Pennsylvania
  - coordinates: 40°09′43″N 079°16′26″W
  - elevation: 1,266 ft (386 m)
- Length: 4.58 mi (7.37 km)
- Basin size: 9.15 square miles (23.7 km^{2})
- Discharge
  - location: Loyalhanna Creek
  - average: 19.87 cu ft/s (0.563 m^{3}/s) at mouth with Loyalhanna Creek

Basin features
- Progression: northeast
- River system: Loyalhanna Creek
- Tributaries
  - left: unnamed tributaries
  - right: Laurel Run; Powdermill Run

White Oak Run is a 4.58 mi (7.37 km) long 3rd order tributary to Loyalhanna Creek in Westmoreland County, Pennsylvania.

== Variant names ==
According to the Geographic Names Information System, it has also been known historically as:

- Whiteoak Run

== Course ==
White Oak Run rises on the Indian Creek divide about 0.25 miles (0.40 km) northeast of Kregar in Westmoreland County. White Oak Run then flows northeast to meet Loyalhanna Creek about 0.25 miles (0.40 km) north of Weaver Mill, Pennsylvania.

== Watershed ==
White Oak Run drains 9.15 square miles (23.7 km^{2}) of area, receives about 49.9 in/year of precipitation, has a topographic wetness index of 378.29, and has an average water temperature of 8.74 °C. The watershed is 92% forested.

== Additional images ==
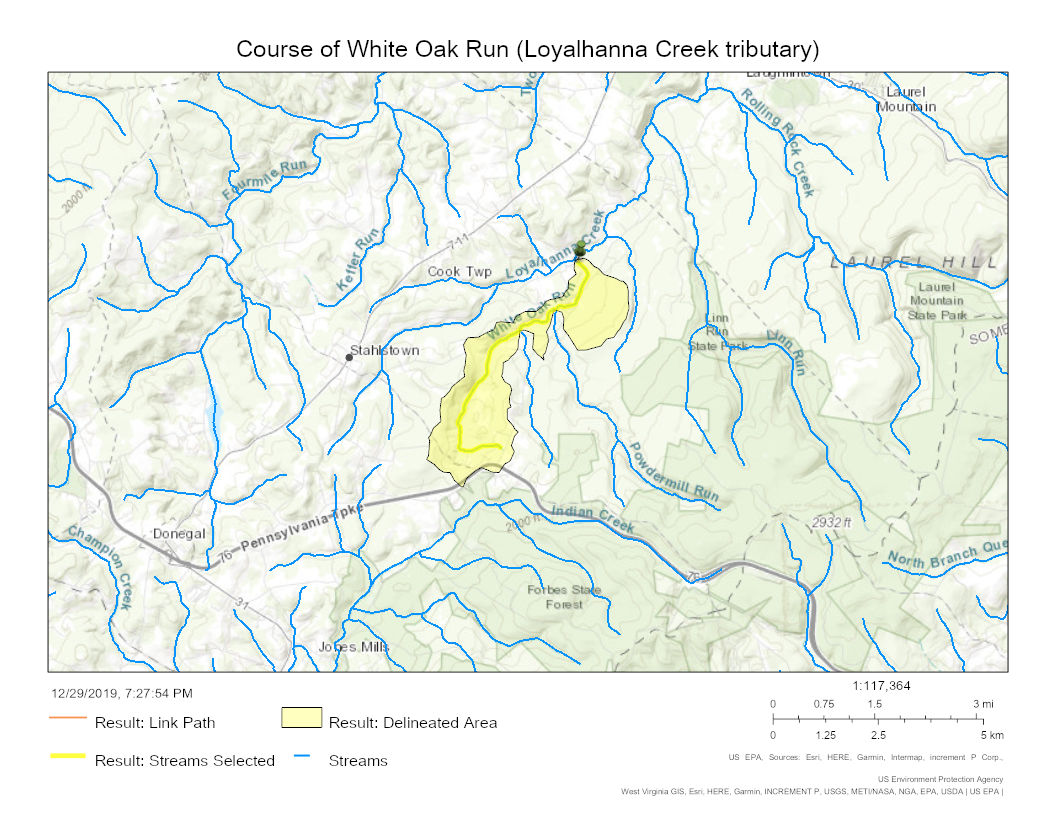
Course of White Oak Run (Loyalhanna Creek tributary) in Westmoreland County, Pennsylvania

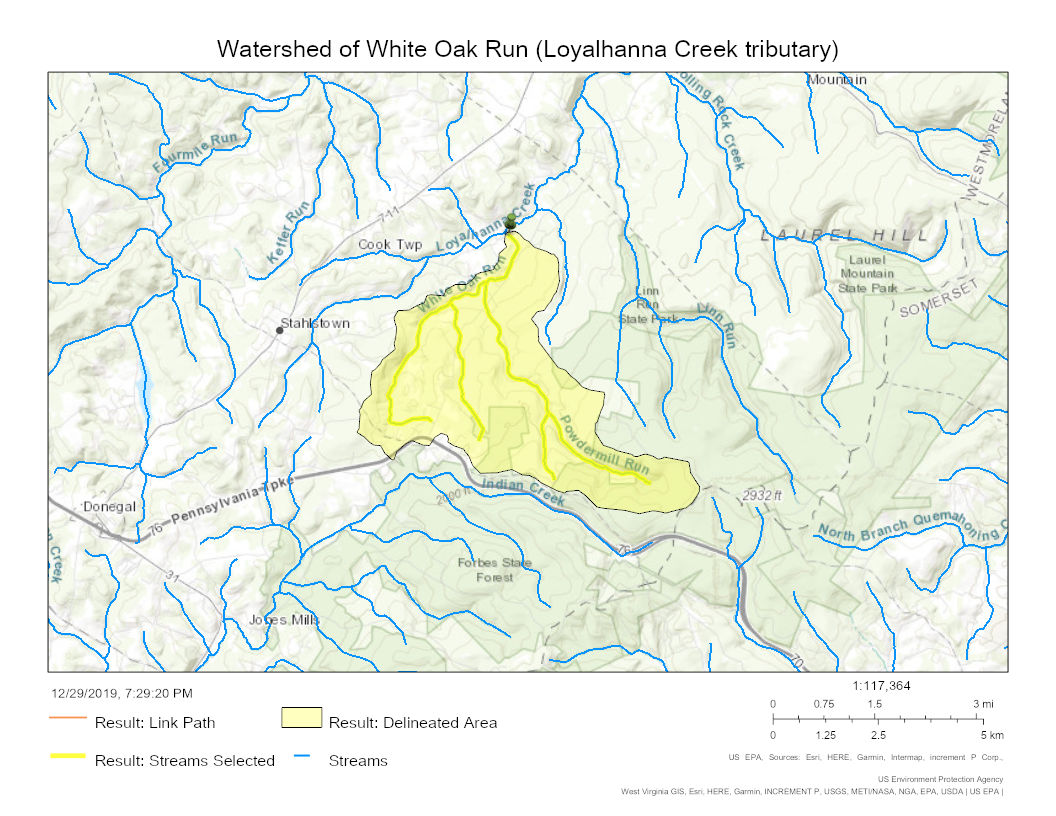
Watershed of White Oak Run (Loyalhanna Creek tributary) in Westmoreland County, Pennsylvania
