= Black Lick Township, Pennsylvania =

Township in Pennsylvania, US

Coordinates: 40°29′00″N 79°17′00″W

- Township
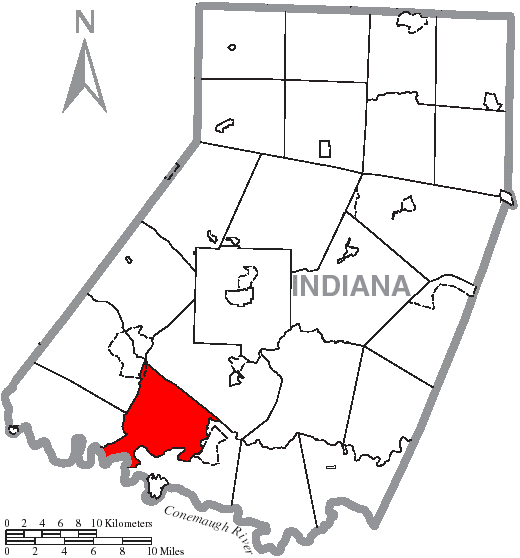
- Map of Indiana County, Pennsylvania, highlighting Black Lick Township

- Map of Pennsylvania highlighting Indiana County
- Country: United States
- State: Pennsylvania
- County: Indiana

Area
  - Total: 27.94 sq mi (72.36 km^{2})
  - Land: 27.33 sq mi (70.78 km^{2})
  - Water: 0.61 sq mi (1.59 km^{2})

Population (2020)
  - Total: 1,133 ▼
  - Estimate (2021): 1,128
  - Density: 43.2/sq mi (16.69/km^{2})
- Time zone: UTC-5 (Eastern (EST))
  - Summer (DST): UTC-4 (EDT)
- FIPS code: 42-063-06752

Black Lick Township is a township in Indiana County, Pennsylvania, United States. The population was 1,133 at the 2020 census. The township includes the communities of Grafton, Jacksonville, and Newport.

== Geography ==
According to the United States Census Bureau, the township has a total area of 27.9 square miles (72 km^{2}), of which 27.4 square miles (71 km^{2}) is land and 0.5 square miles (1.3 km^{2}) (1.79%) is water.

== Demographics ==
Historical population
Census	Pop.	Note	%±
1850	2,043		—
1860	1,130		−44.7%
1870	1,016		−10.1%
1880	924		−9.1%
1890	869		−6.0%
1900	797		−8.3%
1910	800		0.4%
1920	1,078		34.8%
1930	935		−13.3%
1940	894		−4.4%
1950	778		−13.0%
1960	685		−12.0%
1970	917		33.9%
1980	1,164		26.9%
1990	1,225		5.2%
2000	1,317		7.5%
2010	1,237		−6.1%
2020	1,133		−8.4%
2021 (est.)	1,128		−0.4%
U.S. Decennial Census

As of the 2000 census, there were 1,317 people, 515 households, and 388 families residing in the township. The population density was 48.0 inhabitants per square mile (18.5/km^{2}). There were 540 housing units at an average density of 19.7/sq mi (7.6/km^{2}). The racial makeup of the township was 99.32% White, 0.08% from other races, and 0.61% from two or more races. Hispanic or Latino of any race were 0.23% of the population.

There were 515 households, out of which 30.1% had children under the age of 18 living with them, 65.0% were married couples living together, 6.4% had a female householder with no husband present, and 24.5% were non-families. 21.9% of all households were made up of individuals, and 10.5% had someone living alone who was 65 years of age or older. The average household size was 2.55 and the average family size was 2.97.

In the township the population was spread out, with 23.5% under the age of 18, 6.5% from 18 to 24, 29.2% from 25 to 44, 26.1% from 45 to 64, and 14.7% who were 65 years of age or older. The median age was 40 years. For every 100 females, there were 96.6 males. For every 100 females age 18 and over, there were 94.2 males.

The median income for a household in the township was $35,536, and the median income for a family was $42,500. Males had a median income of $35,625 versus $21,016 for females. The per capita income for the township was $16,766. About 7.8% of families and 10.0% of the population were below the poverty line, including 13.3% of those under age 18 and 8.3% of those age 65 or over.
