= Loyalhanna Creek =

Stream in Pennsylvania, USA

Loyalhanna Creek Tributary to Kiskiminetas River
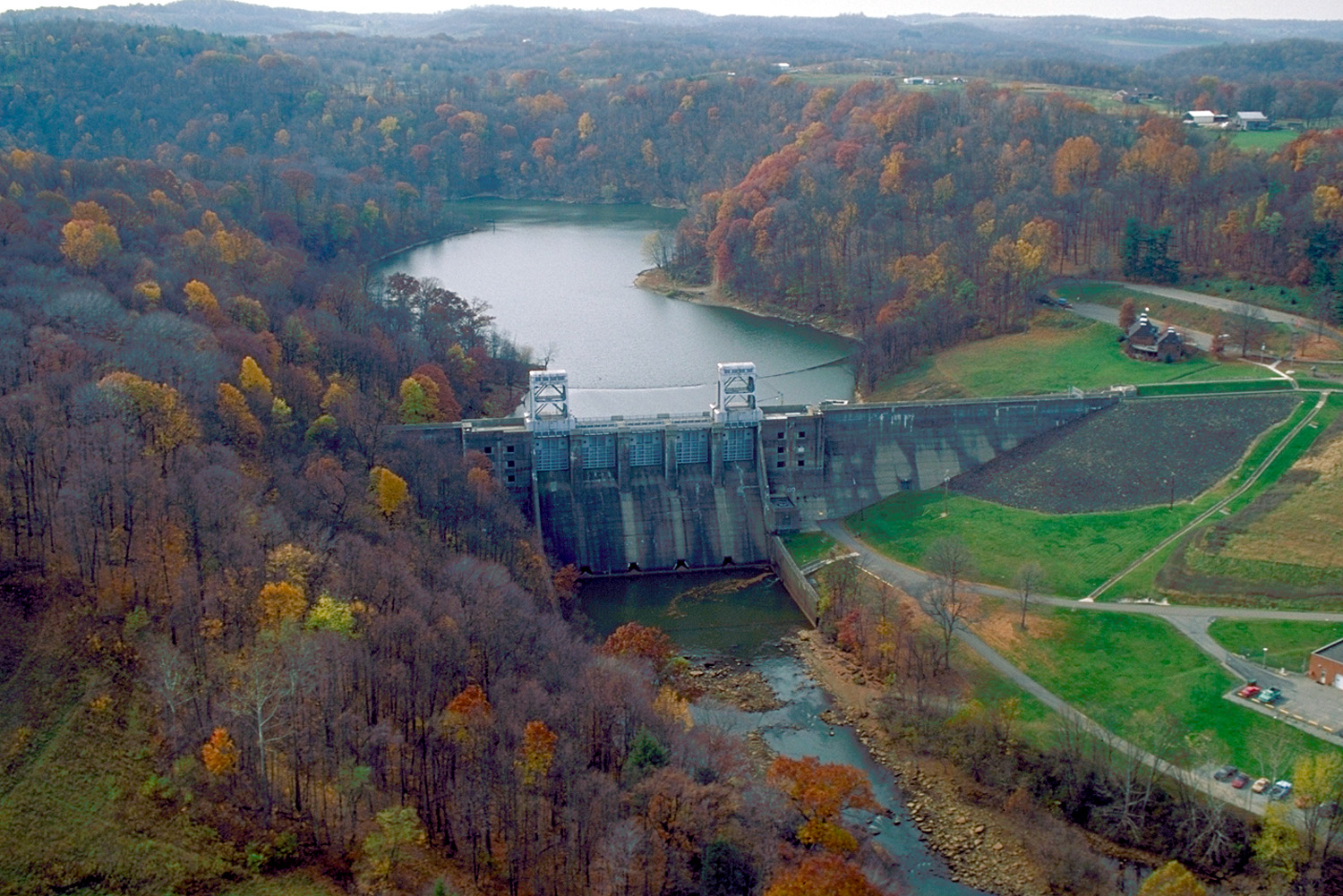
- Loyalhanna Lake and Dam on Loyalhanna Creek in Westmoreland County, Pennsylvania looking upriver toward the west-northwest

- Location of Loyalhanna Creek mouth Loyalhanna Creek (the United States)

Location
- Country: United States
- State: Pennsylvania
- County: Westmoreland
- City: Latrobe
- Borough: Ligonier

Physical characteristics
- Source: Indian Creek divide
  - location: about 2 miles northwest of Kregar, Pennsylvania
  - coordinates: 40°07′45″N 079°20′20″W
  - elevation: 1,750 ft (530 m)
- Mouth: Kiskiminetas River
  - location: Saltsburg, Pennsylvania
  - coordinates: 40°29′07″N 079°27′16″W
  - elevation: 827 ft (252 m)
- Length: 47.89 mi (77.07 km)
- Basin size: 298.66 square miles (773.5 km^{2})
- Discharge
  - location: Kiskiminetas River
  - average: 550.80 cu ft/s (15.597 m^{3}/s) at mouth with Kiskiminetas River

Basin features
- Progression: northeast then northwest
- River system: Allegheny River
- Tributaries
  - left: Twomile Run; Fourmile Run; St. Clair Hollow; Ninemile Run; Monastery Run; Unity Run; Crabtree Creek; Whitethorn Creek; Serviceberry Run; Getty Run
  - right: White Oak Run; Phoebe Run; Linn Run; Rolling Rock Creek; Laughlintown Run; Zimmerman Run; Mill Creek; Coalpit Run; Rock Hollow; Miller Run; Saxman Run; Union Run; Keystone Run
- Waterbodies: Loyalhanna Lake

Loyalhanna Creek is a 50-mile (80 km) long tributary of the Kiskiminetas River in Westmoreland County in the U.S. state of Pennsylvania. The stream is a popular destination for canoeing and recreational trout fishing.

== Etymology ==
The creek derives its name from the eighteenth-century village of Layalhanning, an important Delaware Indian crossroads settlement located at the site where Fort Ligonier was built, in present Ligonier, Pennsylvania. The village was settled shortly after the Delaware left the Susquehanna River area in 1727. Layalhanning means "the middle stream" in the Delaware language— "lawel" or "lawell" (middle); "hanna" (a river or stream); "ing" (at the place of).

== Variant names ==
According to the Geographic Names Information System, it has also been known historically as:

- Leyelhanna Creek
- Loyal Hanna Creek

== Course ==
Loyalhanna rises from Laurel Ridge in southeastern Westmoreland County, north of Donegal and flows NNE, along the southeastern side of Chestnut Ridge. Approximately 5 mi (8 km) northwest of Ligonier it turns northwest, cutting through Chestnut Ridge and passing through Latrobe. From Latrobe, it flows NNW, passing through Loyalhanna Lake reservoir and joins with the Conemaugh River to form the Kiskiminetas River at Saltsburg. The creek lies about midway between the Juniata River to the east and the Ohio River to the west, and about halfway between the Conemaugh River to the north and the Youghiogheny River to the south.

== Watershed ==
Decades before the 2000s, the lower end of the creek, beginning above Latrobe, was colored red due to acid leakage from local mines. Rocks in the area are still stained red from the effects. In subsequent years, with the growth of environmental sensitivity, a remediation pond was installed near Saint Vincent College that removes 90 percent of the iron oxide from the water.

in October 2025 a news story mentioned the return of otters and bald eagles, an indication that the creek clean-up improved the local ecological system.

== Claims of Bigfoot sightings ==
Sam Sherry, of Wilpen, claimed to have encountered a Bigfoot while night fishing along Loyalhanna Creek on May 17, 1987. Sherry gained notice from Bigfoot enthusiasts and spent much of his life investigating the phenomenon in the area.

== Additional images ==
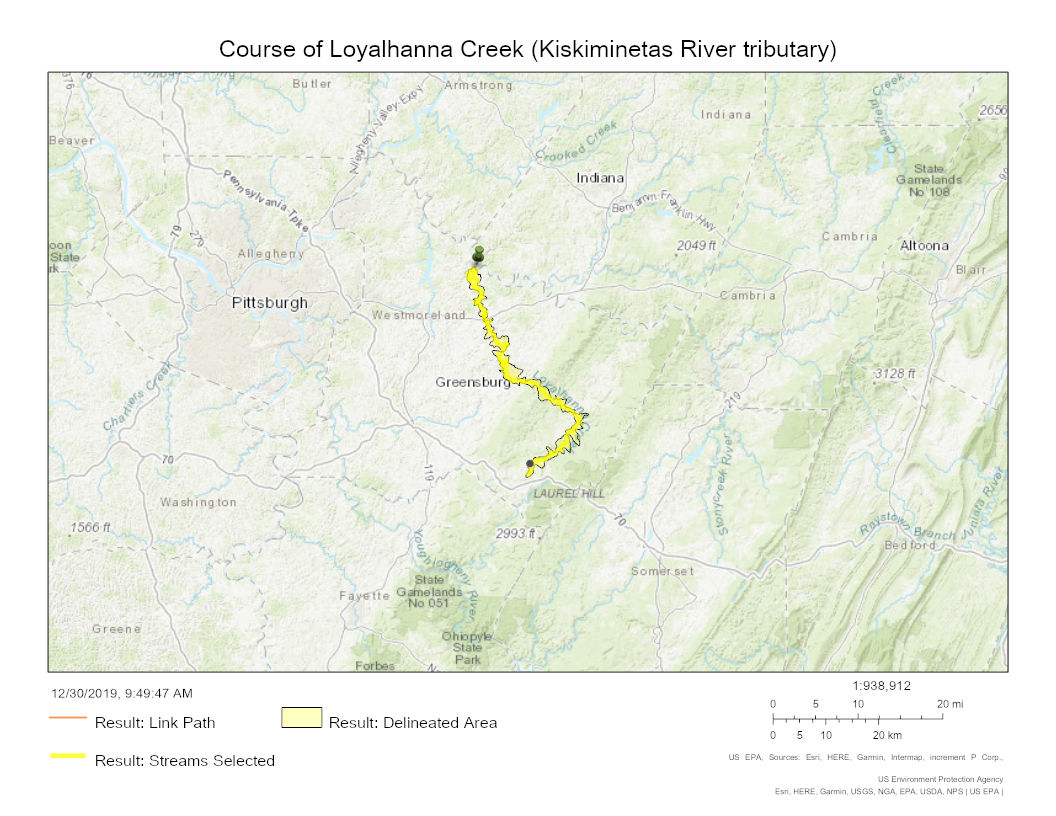
Course of Loyalhanna Creek (Kiskiminetas River tributary) in Westmoreland County, Pennsylvania

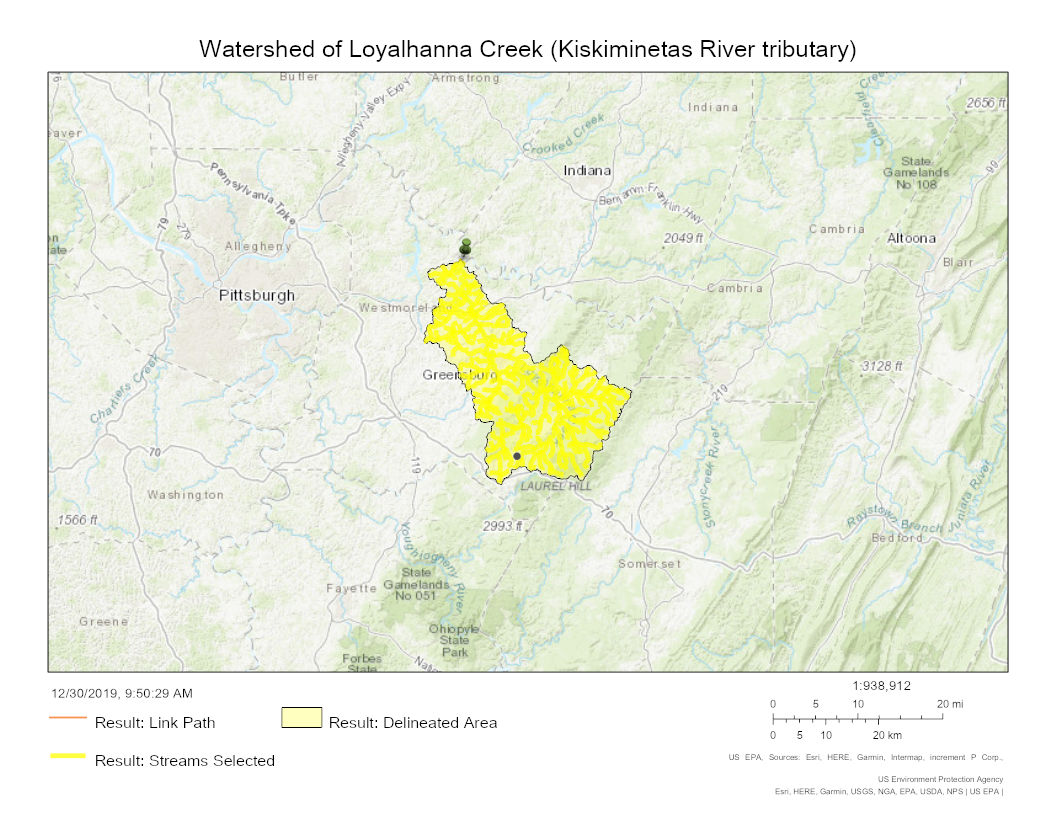
Watershed of Loyalhanna Creek (Kiskiminetas River tributary) in Westmoreland County, Pennsylvania

== See also ==
- List of rivers of Pennsylvania
- List of tributaries of the Allegheny River
