= Saltsburg, Pennsylvania =

Borough in Pennsylvania, US

- Borough
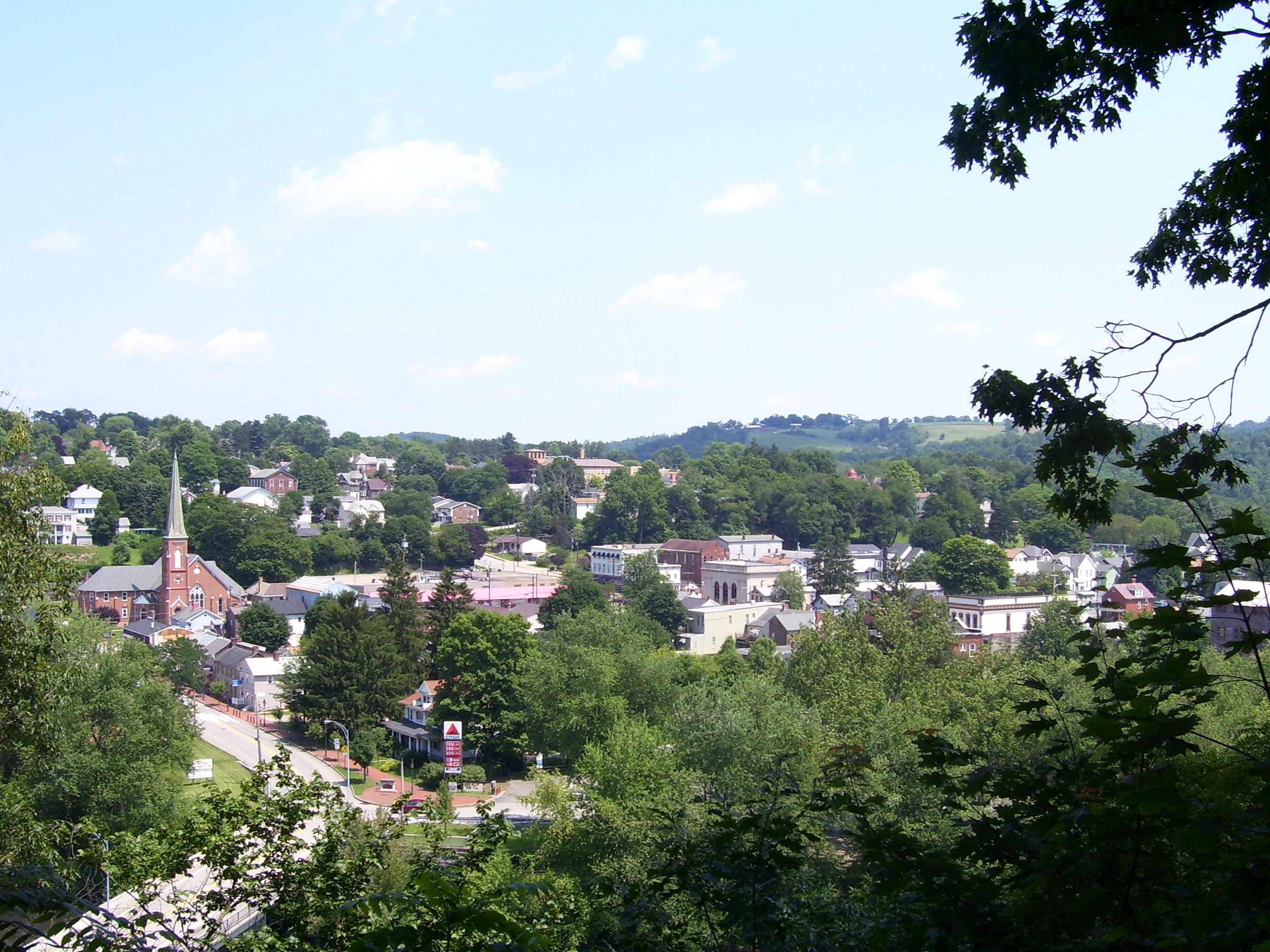
- Saltsburg
- Motto: A Pennsylvania Canal Town
- Location of Saltsburg in Indiana County, Pennsylvania.

- Location within Pennsylvania
- Coordinates: 40°29′09″N 79°26′52″W
- Country: United States
- State: Pennsylvania
- County: Indiana
- Settled: 1817
- Incorporated: 1836

Government
  - Type: Borough Council

Area
  - Total: 0.24 sq mi (0.62 km^{2})
  - Land: 0.21 sq mi (0.54 km^{2})
  - Water: 0.035 sq mi (0.09 km^{2})

Population (2020)
  - Total: 780 ▼
  - Estimate (2024): 768
  - Density: 3,881/sq mi (1,498.5/km^{2})
- Time zone: UTC-5 (Eastern (EST))
  - Summer (DST): UTC-4 (EDT)
- Zip Code: 15681
- Area code: 724
- FIPS code: 42-67648
- Website: Borough website

Saltsburg is a borough in Indiana County, Pennsylvania, United States. It is located in Western Pennsylvania, in the southwestern corner of Indiana County, near its border with Westmoreland County.

The town was based on the construction of salt wells and the canals and railroad tracks that passed through it. Its population was 780 at the 2020 census.

== History ==
On June 20, 1769, William Gray conducted the first survey in the Saltsburg area. Early settlers of the wooded region were mainly Scots-Irish immigrants who migrated west between 1768 and 1795. The settlers did not settle the area near the Kiskiminetas River until 1795 because of "the frequent attacks of the savages".

The name 'Saltsburg' was adopted because of the salt grain that flourished in the area. Around the years 1795–1798, a Mrs. Deemer was the first settler to prove salt was present in the Conemaugh River, about one mile above Saltsburg's present site, in the town now known as Moween. Deemer produced a sample of salt by evaporating the water from the river.

In January 1817, the first sale of land was made to the Congregation of Saltsburg. In 1816-1817, Andrew Boggs purchased a large tract of land that contained the first town lots. The first settlers unanimously named the town for the newly thriving salt industry. The town's religion was mainly Presbyterian, the denomination of the first church built in Saltsburg. The first house was built in 1820 and is now occupied by the Presbyterian Church.

The town quickly filled with merchants in the late 1820s and became a prosperous place to reside. John Carson became the first tailor in 1827. Daniel Davis was the first blacksmith in 1828, and George Johnston was the first merchant in 1829. The town's population continued to grow, and in 1838 it was declared a borough. In 1840, the estimated population was 335.

The primary means of transportation in the area were on foot, by carriage, by train, or by boat. The canal and railroad were major trade conduits for the town and the region. As the town grew, it became a site for the passage of the mainline canal from Harrisburg to Pittsburgh. Coal and salt were transported along the canal, and boat-building became one of the chief industries of the town. In 1835 and 1836, Robert Young, Butler Meyers, and Jacob Newhouse opened the first canal-boat construction business in the town. In 1855, the railroad bridge was built, with Major S.S. Jameson as the contractor and with the help of the principal mason John Marth. By 1864, the railroad brought an end to the canal era. The town's growth was minimal until coalmines became prevalent in the 1870s.

Dr. John McFarland, a graduate of Jefferson Medical College, was the town's first physician; he came to Saltsburg in 1836. McFarland was also the director of the Indiana County Medical Society and an instructor at the Saltsburg Academy. He served in the state House of Representatives from 1845 to 1846 and became one of the first directors of the Northern Pennsylvania Railroad. The first school was a log house located closer to the trestlework or railroad bridge. John Whittlesey was the first teacher, and John Bucklin was the second. The Saltsburg Academy was established in 1852.

== Geography ==
Saltsburg is located at the confluence of the Conemaugh River and Loyalhanna Creek, which form the Kiskiminetas River.

According to the United States Census Bureau, the borough has a total area of 0.2 square miles (0.52 km^{2}), of which 0.2 square miles (0.52 km^{2}) is land and 0.04 square miles (0.10 km^{2}) is water. The total area is 16.67% water.

=== Climate ===
According to the Köppen Climate Classification system, Saltsburg has a humid subtropical climate, abbreviated "Cfa" on climate maps. The highest temperature recorded in Saltsburg was 98 °F (36.7 °C) on July 8, 2012, while the lowest was −22 °F (−30.0 °C) on January 19, 1994.

Climate data for Loyalhanna Lake, Pennsylvania, 1991–2020 normals, extremes 1989–present
Month	Jan	Feb	Mar	Apr	May	Jun	Jul	Aug	Sep	Oct	Nov	Dec	Year
Record high °F (°C)	71 (22)	77 (25)	84 (29)	90 (32)	93 (34)	97 (36)	98 (37)	96 (36)	97 (36)	90 (32)	79 (26)	73 (23)	98 (37)
Mean maximum °F (°C)	60.7 (15.9)	62.4 (16.9)	73.4 (23.0)	81.8 (27.7)	86.9 (30.5)	90.9 (32.7)	92.2 (33.4)	90.8 (32.7)	88.6 (31.4)	80.6 (27.0)	70.7 (21.5)	60.9 (16.1)	93.5 (34.2)
Mean daily maximum °F (°C)	36.6 (2.6)	39.9 (4.4)	49.4 (9.7)	62.4 (16.9)	71.8 (22.1)	79.5 (26.4)	83.3 (28.5)	81.6 (27.6)	75.7 (24.3)	63.8 (17.7)	51.7 (10.9)	40.5 (4.7)	61.4 (16.3)
Daily mean °F (°C)	27.6 (−2.4)	29.8 (−1.2)	38.0 (3.3)	49.2 (9.6)	58.9 (14.9)	67.2 (19.6)	71.1 (21.7)	70.0 (21.1)	63.4 (17.4)	51.9 (11.1)	40.7 (4.8)	32.3 (0.2)	50.0 (10.0)
Mean daily minimum °F (°C)	18.6 (−7.4)	19.6 (−6.9)	26.7 (−2.9)	36.1 (2.3)	46.0 (7.8)	54.9 (12.7)	59.0 (15.0)	58.3 (14.6)	51.2 (10.7)	39.9 (4.4)	29.7 (−1.3)	24.2 (−4.3)	38.7 (3.7)
Mean minimum °F (°C)	−1.1 (−18.4)	2.1 (−16.6)	11.2 (−11.6)	24.2 (−4.3)	32.3 (0.2)	43.2 (6.2)	50.3 (10.2)	49.3 (9.6)	40.1 (4.5)	27.6 (−2.4)	17.6 (−8.0)	8.8 (−12.9)	−3.8 (−19.9)
Record low °F (°C)	−22 (−30)	−21 (−29)	−5 (−21)	16 (−9)	26 (−3)	36 (2)	39 (4)	42 (6)	30 (−1)	14 (−10)	4 (−16)	−18 (−28)	−22 (−30)
Average precipitation inches (mm)	3.07 (78)	2.51 (64)	3.25 (83)	3.76 (96)	4.00 (102)	4.13 (105)	4.33 (110)	4.60 (117)	4.00 (102)	2.88 (73)	3.34 (85)	3.57 (91)	43.44 (1,106)
Average snowfall inches (cm)	9.9 (25)	6.9 (18)	3.0 (7.6)	0.8 (2.0)	0.0 (0.0)	0.0 (0.0)	0.0 (0.0)	0.0 (0.0)	0.0 (0.0)	0.0 (0.0)	1.0 (2.5)	4.2 (11)	25.8 (66.1)
Average precipitation days (≥ 0.01 in)	15.9	13.3	13.7	13.5	13.5	13.3	11.5	11.2	9.9	12.5	12.4	13.5	154.2
Average snowy days (≥ 0.1 in)	5.8	4.8	2.2	0.5	0.0	0.0	0.0	0.0	0.0	0.0	0.7	3.6	17.6
Source 1: NOAA (snow/snow days 1981–2010)
Source 2: National Weather Service

== Demographics ==
Historical population
Census	Pop.	Note	%±
1840	339		—
1850	623		83.8%
1860	592		−5.0%
1870	659		11.3%
1880	866		31.4%
1890	1,088		25.6%
1900	828		−23.9%
1910	1,044		26.1%
1920	1,022		−2.1%
1930	1,035		1.3%
1940	1,097		6.0%
1950	1,156		5.4%
1960	1,054		−8.8%
1970	1,037		−1.6%
1980	964		−7.0%
1990	990		2.7%
2000	955		−3.5%
2010	873		−8.6%
2020	780		−10.7%
2024 (est.)	768	▼	−1.5%

As of the 2000 United States census, there were 955 people, 406 households, and 261 families residing in the borough. The population density was 4,628.9 inhabitants per square mile (1,787.2/km^{2}). There were 445 housing units at an average density of 2,156.9 per square mile (832.8/km^{2}). The racial makeup of the borough was 99.16% White, 0.21% African American, 0.10% Native American, 0.31% Asian, 0.21% from other races. Hispanic or Latino of any race were 1.36% of the population.

There were 406 households, out of which 30.0% had children under the age of 18 living with them, 48.8% were married couples living together, 11.6% had a female householder with no husband present, and 35.7% were non-families. 33.5% of all households were made up of individuals, and 19.7% had someone living alone who was 65 years of age or older. The average household size was 2.33, and the average family size was 2.97.

In the borough, the population was spread out, with 25.4% under the age of 18, 7.3% from 18 to 24, 25.5% from 25 to 44, 22.7% from 45 to 64, and 19.0% who were 65 years of age or older. The median age was 38 years. For every 100 females, there were 91.4 males. For every 100 females age 18 and over, there were 81.2 males.

The median income for a household in the borough was $27,448, and the median income for a family was $37,614. Males had a median income of $32,778 versus $24,688 for females. The per capita income for the borough was $14,580. About 11.4% of families and 12.7% of the population were below the poverty line, including 14.7% of those under age 18 and 11.9% of those age 65 or over.

== Arts and culture ==
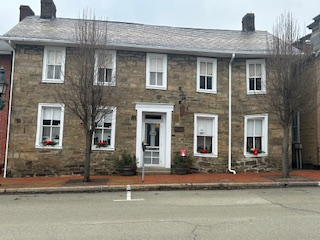
Front view of Rebecca B. Stone House Museum

Every year in early June, Saltsburg holds a three-day community celebration in Canal Park and on Point Street, featuring live music, a fireworks display, and the annual duck race, in which numbered plastic ducks are thrown into the river from the bridge.

Saltsburg also holds community days in early September called "Canal Days", including booths along the canal in the town containing crafts, food, and games, as well as live music, fireworks, and a poker run bicycle ride along the West Penn Trail. At the end of the ride, each person receives five cards to create a poker hand.

The Saltsburg Historic District was listed on the National Register of Historic Places in 1992. Saltsburg is home to two volunteer-run historical organizations: the Saltsburg Area Historical Society and Historic Saltsburg, Inc. The society operates the Rebecca B. Hadden Stone House Museum.

Historic Saltsburg, Inc. focuses on preserving the town's architectural heritage, researching historic structures, and promoting initiatives like the National Register Historic District and self-guided walking tours.

As part of the Western Pennsylvania Trail network, Saltsburg collaborates with regional organizations to restore and interpret cultural resources, ensuring its history remains vibrant.

There is an elementary school as well as a high school, located next to the Kiskiminetas River. The Rebecca B. Hadden Stone House Museum has been standing since the days of the canal. The Saltsburg Area Historical Society operates a museum in an 1830 stone house, showcasing local history through period furnishings, artifacts, and industry exhibits on the canal era, salt, glass, and coal. Displays also highlight pottery, arrowheads, blacksmith tools, military memorabilia, and notable local figures.

== Education ==
- Saltsburg Elementary K-5 and River Valley School - River Valley School District
- The Kiski School

== Infrastructure ==
The borough maintains a police department with two police officers. Supplemental police protection is provided by the Pennsylvania State Police. Saltsburg also has a volunteer fire department (Station 131).
