= Central Westmoreland Career and Technology Center =

Coordinates: 40.229431°N 79.601719°W

Location
- 240 Arona Road; New Stanton, Pennsylvania 15672

Information
- School type: Public, Vocational-Educational
- Opened: 1963
- Director: Jason Lucia
- Principal: Josh Testa
- Faculty: 95
- Website: https://www.cwctc.org/

Central Westmoreland Career and Technology Center, or CWCTC, is located in New Stanton, Pennsylvania. CWCTC is a part-time Career and Technical Educational School with 10 sending school districts. Students also receive their Physical And Health Educations at the center and are also assigned a student-services counselor, according to their last name

== Member School Districts and High Schools ==
High School	School district
Belle Vernon Area High School	Belle Vernon Area School District
Frazier High School	Frazier School District
Greensburg Salem High School	Greensburg Salem School District
Hempfield Area High School	Hempfield Area School District
Jeannette Senior High School	Jeannette City School District
Mount Pleasant Area Junior/Senior High School	Mount Pleasant Area School District
Norwin High School	Norwin School District
Penn-Trafford High School	Penn-Trafford School District
Southmoreland High School	Southmoreland School District
Yough High School	Yough School District

== Programs ==
There are 23 programs at CWCTC, ranging from Cosmetology to Carpentry to Graphic Arts to Logistics.Other noteworthy programs are the Powerline Technology, Protective Services, and Horticulture and Masonry.
