= Hempfield Area High School =

Coordinates: 40.281354°N 79.600064°W

- 4345 Route 136, Greensburg, PA 15601

Information
- Type: Public
- Established: 1956; 70 years ago
- School district: Hempfield Area School District
- Principal: David Palmer
- Faculty: 68.40 (FTE)
- Grades: 9–12
- Student to teacher ratio: 17.92
- Colors: Royal Blue and Silver
- Athletics: WPIAL
- Mascot: Spartan
- Information: 724-834-9000
- Website: Hempfield Area High School

Hempfield Area High School is a high school for students in the Hempfield Township area of Westmoreland County, Pennsylvania.

== History ==
On November 17, 1952, the Articles of Agreement of the Hempfield Area Joint Schools were adopted and work began in earnest to establish a high school. The building included 39 classrooms, 9 vocational areas, an auditorium that seated 1,242, a gymnasium with a 2,200 seating capacity, cafeteria, band and chorus rooms, and a library. The original building and grounds occupied a 67-acre (270,000 m^{2}) area. The size and capacity of the senior high school were determined by a review of the student population of 1952 and a projected six-year enrollment. The new building accommodated 1,200 pupils. The school opened September 5, 1956, with an enrollment of 1,037 students in grades 10, 11, and 12.

Construction began on February 10, 1964, of an approximate two million dollar addition to the original senior high building. The addition was complete for student use in September, 1965. The addition increased the capacity of the school to 3,500 students including an addition to the cafeteria and extensive remodeling in the “C” wing.

In October 1978, Hempfield Area High School was once again altered by an addition to the building. New facilities were added to provide additional teaching space at an approximate cost of 1.5 million dollars. The new addition was completed in 1980.

At the beginning of the 1988-89 school term, another extensive renovation was begun at the senior high school, and completed for the opening of the 1990-91 school term. In 2001, additional work was done to add two more chemistry labs in the science area, as well as a new resource room and a few additional classrooms.

In 2004, even more renovations took place. The baseball field was removed so that the student parking lot could be moved on campus for safety reasons. It was located across busy Route 136. Also, new bleachers, press box and concession stands were added at Spartan Stadium. Also, new athletic fields were added behind the stadium. Finally, a field house with new wrestling facilities, locker rooms and athletic offices was added in the north endzone of Spartan Stadium.

In March 2007, a 15-year-old student was mistakenly jailed for 12 days in a juvenile detention facility for allegedly making a bomb threat over the school district hotline, because school officials had overlooked daylight saving time while evaluating the calling records. The family was later awarded $84,000.

== Technology ==
During the 1993–94 school year, Hempfield Area School District entered the first phase of a major technological advancement program. All teachers were given access to computers, which enabled them to receive electronic mail; maintain grades; do word processing, database and spreadsheet tasks; and access student software.

Computer labs were upgraded and networked in the business and math departments. Computers were phased into several other departments in individual classrooms or in labs, depending upon the needs of the department.

During the 2015–2016 school year, all of the students of the high school were provided with Chromebooks.

== Vocational-technical services ==
HAHS uses the services of Central Westmoreland Career and Technology Center in New Stanton for the students there who wish to choose a vocational or technical program.

== Notable alumni ==
- J. Christian Adams, presidential appointee to the United States Commission on Civil Rights, attorney and Fox News commentator
- Sean Berton, professional football player
- John Dorsey, poet and screenwriter
- Karen Jarrett, professional wrestling valet
- Jasmine Jones, Olympic bronze medalist, two-woman bobsleigh, Milano-Cortina Winter Olympics 2026
- Sheila Kelley, actress
- Rocco Mediate, professional golfer
- Eric Nelson, PA State Representative, 57th Legislative District, 2016–present
- Bridget Williams, Olympic pole vaulter, Paris Summer Olympics 2024
- Mike Williams, experimental particle physicist
