= Lawson Heights =

Lawson Heights can refer to:

- Lawson Heights, Pennsylvania
- Lawson Heights Suburban Centre, Saskatoon, Saskatchewan
- Lawson Heights, Saskatoon
