= Westmoreland County, Pennsylvania =

County in the United States

- County
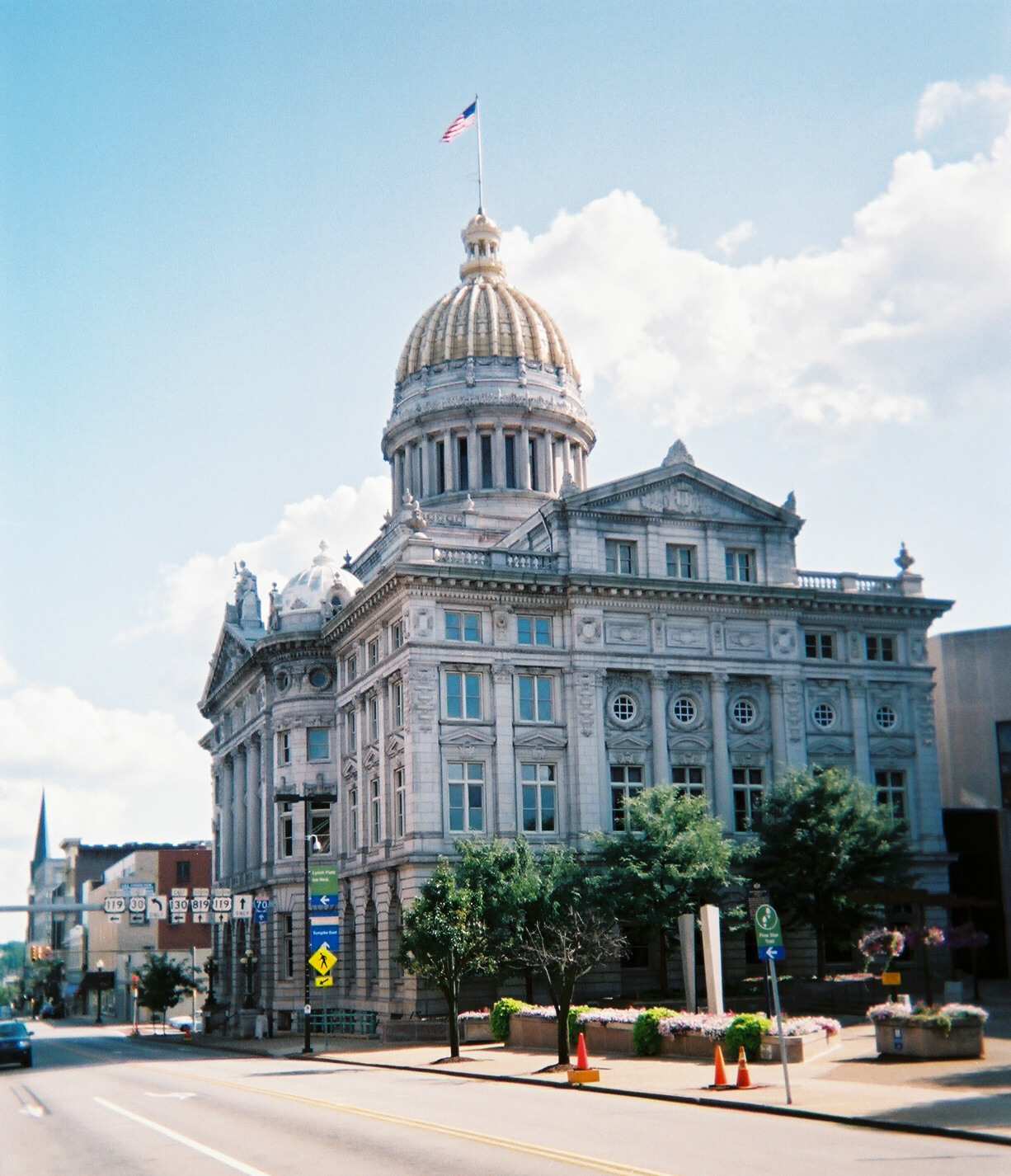
- Westmoreland County Courthouse

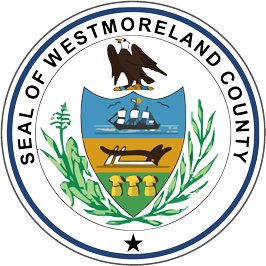
- Flag Seal Logo

- Location within the U.S. state of Pennsylvania
- Coordinates: 40°19′N 79°28′W
- Country: United States
- State: Pennsylvania
- Founded: February 26, 1773
- Named for: Westmorland
- Seat: Greensburg
- Largest city: Hempfield Township

Area
  - Total: 1,036 sq mi (2,680 km^{2})
  - Land: 1,028 sq mi (2,660 km^{2})
  - Water: 8.5 sq mi (22 km^{2}) 0.8%

Population (2020)
  - Total: 354,663
  - Estimate (2025): 349,324 ▼
  - Density: 345/sq mi (133/km^{2})
- Time zone: UTC−5 (Eastern)
  - Summer (DST): UTC−4 (EDT)
- Congressional districts: 12th, 14th
- Website: www.westmorelandcountypa.gov

Westmoreland County is a county in the southwestern part of the commonwealth of Pennsylvania, United States, in the Pittsburgh Metropolitan Statistical Area. As of the 2020 census, the population was 354,663. The county seat is Greensburg and the most populous community is Hempfield Township. The county is part of the Southwest region of the commonwealth. (Note: Includes Westmoreland, Cambria, Fayette, Blair, Indiana, Somerset, Bedford, Huntingdon, Greene and Fulton Counties)

== History ==
The land that became Westmoreland County was originally the home of the Iroquois (also known as the Haudenosaunee or Six Nations). The Treaty of Fort Stanwix opened up the area to colonist settlement in 1768, even though some Europeans had already arrived.

Westmoreland County was founded in 1773. It was named for Westmorland, a historic county in northwestern England. It was the first county in the colony of Pennsylvania whose entire territorial boundary was located west of the Allegheny Mountains. The county originally included the present-day counties of Fayette, Washington, Greene, and parts of Beaver, Allegheny, Indiana, and Armstrong counties.

On December 20, 1785, Joseph Ross of Westmoreland County was sentenced to death for the crime of sodomy. This is the only known execution for sodomy to take place in Pennsylvania's history.

By 1790 about 16,000 people lived in Westmoreland County (as then defined). The Whiskey Rebellion tax protest (1791–1794) took place in Westmoreland and surrounding counties.

A number of places in the county have Ulster origins, including Derry, Donegal, Rostraver, Antrim, Armagh and Tyrone, perhaps because Scotch-Irish Americans settled there.

== Geography ==
According to the U.S. Census Bureau, the county has a total area of 1,036 square miles (2,680 km^{2}), of which 1,028 square miles (2,660 km^{2}) is land and 8.5 square miles (22 km^{2}) (0.8%) is water. Westmoreland County is one of the 423 counties served by the Appalachian Regional Commission, and it is identified as part of "Greater Appalachia" by Colin Woodard in his book American Nations: A History of the Eleven Rival Regional Cultures of North America.

=== Climate ===
Westmoreland has a humid continental climate (Dfa/Dfb). Average monthly temperatures in Greensburg range from 28.7 °F in January to 71.8 °F in July, while in Murrysville they range from 29.4 °F in January to 73.1 °F in July, in Latrobe they range from 28.9 °F in January to 72.0 °F in July, and in Ligonier they range from 28.1 °F in January to 71.1 °F in July.

=== Adjacent counties ===
- Armstrong County (north)
- Indiana County (northeast)
- Cambria County (east)
- Somerset County (southeast)
- Fayette County (south)
- Washington County (southwest)
- Allegheny County (west)
- Butler County (northwest)

=== Major highways ===
- I-70
- I-76 / Penna Turnpike
- US 30
- US 22
- US 119
- PA 31
- PA 51
- PA 56
- PA 56 Truck
- PA 66 / PA Turnpike 66
- PA 66 Bus.
- PA 66 Alt.
- PA 130
- PA 136
- PA 201
- PA 217
- PA 259
- PA 271
- PA 286
- PA 356
- PA 366
- PA 380
- PA 381
- PA 711
- PA 780
- PA 819
- PA 906
- PA 981
- PA 982
- PA 993

== Demographics ==
Historical population
Census	Pop.	Note	%±
1790	16,019		—
1800	22,726		41.9%
1810	26,392		16.1%
1820	30,540		15.7%
1830	38,400		25.7%
1840	42,699		11.2%
1850	51,726		21.1%
1860	53,736		3.9%
1870	58,719		9.3%
1880	78,036		32.9%
1890	112,819		44.6%
1900	160,175		42.0%
1910	231,304		44.4%
1920	273,568		18.3%
1930	294,995		7.8%
1940	303,411		2.9%
1950	313,179		3.2%
1960	352,629		12.6%
1970	376,935		6.9%
1980	392,294		4.1%
1990	370,321		−5.6%
2000	369,993		−0.1%
2010	365,169		−1.3%
2020	354,663		−2.9%
2025 (est.)	349,324	▼	−1.5%
U.S. Decennial Census; 1790-1960 1900-1990; 1990-2000 2010-2019 2010-2020

=== Racial and ethnic composition ===
Westmoreland County, Pennsylvania – Racial and ethnic composition Note: the US Census treats Hispanic/Latino as an ethnic category. This table excludes Latinos from the racial categories and assigns them to a separate category. Hispanics/Latinos may be of any race.
Race / Ethnicity (NH = Non-Hispanic)	Pop 1980	Pop 1990	Pop 2000	Pop 2010	Pop 2020	% 1980	% 1990	% 2000	% 2010	% 2020
White alone (NH)	382,983	360,067	355,944	346,111	323,114	97.63%	97.23%	96.20%	94.78%	91.10%
Black or African American alone (NH)	6,391	6,848	7,375	8,425	8,985	1.63%	1.85%	1.99%	2.31%	2.53%
Native American or Alaska Native alone (NH)	248	252	300	305	295	0.06%	0.07%	0.08%	0.08%	0.08%
Asian alone (NH)	1,138	1,549	1,897	2,692	3,301	0.29%	0.42%	0.51%	0.74%	0.93%
Native Hawaiian or Pacific Islander alone (NH)	x	x	58	59	36	x	x	0.02%	0.02%	0.01%
Other race alone (NH)	288	246	308	242	953	0.07%	0.07%	0.08%	0.07%	0.27%
Mixed race or Multiracial (NH)	x	x	2,242	4,156	12,749	x	x	0.61%	1.14%	3.59%
Hispanic or Latino (any race)	1,246	1,359	1,869	3,179	5,230	0.32%	0.37%	0.51%	0.87%	1.47%
Total	392,294	370,321	369,993	365,169	354,663	100.00%	100.00%	100.00%	100.00%	100.00%

=== 2020 census ===
As of the 2020 census, the county had a population of 354,663. The median age was 47.6 years. 18.3% of residents were under the age of 18, and 23.6% of residents were 65 years of age or older. For every 100 females there were 95.7 males, and for every 100 females age 18 and over there were 94.0 males age 18 and over.

The racial makeup of the county was 91.5% White, 2.6% Black or African American, 0.1% American Indian and Alaska Native, 0.9% Asian, <0.1% Native Hawaiian and Pacific Islander, 0.5% from some other race, and 4.3% from two or more races. Hispanic or Latino residents of any race comprised 1.5% of the population.

73.5% of residents lived in urban areas, while 26.5% lived in rural areas.

There were 152,833 households in the county, of which 23.6% had children under the age of 18 living in them. Of all households, 49.3% were married-couple households, 18.2% were households with a male householder and no spouse or partner present, and 26.1% were households with a female householder and no spouse or partner present. About 30.8% of all households were made up of individuals, and 15.2% had someone living alone who was 65 years of age or older.

There were 167,776 housing units, of which 8.9% were vacant. Among occupied housing units, 76.6% were owner-occupied, and 23.4% were renter-occupied. The homeowner vacancy rate was 1.6%, and the rental vacancy rate was 9.3%.

=== 2010 census ===
At the 2010 census, there were 365,169 people, 153,650 households, and 101,928 families residing in the county. The population density was 355.4 people per square mile (137.2 people/km^{2}). There were 168,199 housing units at an average density of 163.7 units per square mile (63.2/km^{2}). The racial makeup of the county was 95.3% White, 2.3% Black or African American, 0.1% Native American, 0.7% Asian, 0.03% Pacific Islander, 0.2% from other races, and 1.2% from two or more races. 0.9% of the population were Hispanic or Latino of any race.

There were 153,650 households, of which 24.5% had children under the age of 18 living with them, 52.2% were married couples living together, 10.0% had a female householder with no husband present, and 33.7% were non-families. 29.0% of all households were made up of individuals, and 13.3% had someone living alone who was 65 years of age or older. The average household size was 2.32, and the average family size was 2.86.

22.3% of the population were under 18, 5.1% from 18 to 24, 22.4% from 25 to 44, 31.3% from 45 to 64, and 18.9% who were 65 years of age or older. The median age was 45.1 years. For every 100 females, there were 94.8 males. For every 100 females age 18 and over, there were 92.3 males.

== Politics and government ==
=== Voter registration ===
As of November 4, 2024, there are 255,693 registered voters in Westmoreland County.

- Republican: 131,903 (51.59%)
- Democratic: 91,183 (35.66%)
- Independent: 22,697 (8.88%)
- Minor parties: 9,910 (3.88%)
Chart of Voter Registration
1. Republican (51.6%)
2. Democratic (35.7%)
3. Independent (8.88%)
4. Other Parties (3.88%)

=== Political history ===
The Democratic Party historically dominated county-level politics between the New Deal realignment and the turn of the century; however, Westmoreland has trended Republican at the national and statewide levels in the 21st century (in direct lockstep with most other Appalachian counties).

In 2000, Republican George W. Bush became the first Republican to carry the county since 1972. Republicans have won the county in every election since, increasing the margin of victory in every successive election until 2020. Democratic Governor Ed Rendell lost Westmoreland in 2002 and 2006. In 2004, Republican Bob Regola flipped the 39th Senate district by beating out incumbent Allen Kukovich. Then in 2008, Republican Tim Krieger picked up the 57th House district left open by the retirement of Democratic state representative Tom Tangretti. Kim Ward also held 39th Senate district for the GOP the seat Bob Regola flipped four years earlier.

In 2010, both Pat Toomey and Tom Corbett won Westmoreland in their statewide bids. Also, the GOP gained control of two more State House districts, the 54th with Eli Evankovich and the 56th with George Dunbar. In 2011, the Republican Party swept all county row offices. A Democratic resurgence in 2015 gave that party a majority of the county commissioners. However, in the 2019 elections, Democratic elected officials lost that majority and carried only one row office. In 2020, the County Sheriff, who was the lone Democrat who won a row office in 2019, switched party affiliations from Democratic to Republican. In 2021 Republicans carried all of the row offices including defeating the incumbent District Attorney and County Coroner, following the 2021 election the minority County Commissioner was the only Democrat to hold Countywide office. In 2023, Republicans retained their majority on the Board of Commissioners and held every row office.

As of 2020, the only majority-Democratic cities within the county were Arnold and Monessen. That being said, local Democrats running statewide sometimes win additional cities and boroughs. For example, in the 2022 Gubernatorial race, the cities of Greensburg, New Kensington, Latrobe, and Jeannette all voted for Democrat Josh Shapiro over Republican Doug Mastriano despite voting Republican in the 2020 Presidential election.

United States presidential election results for Westmoreland County, Pennsylvania
Year	Republican		Democratic		Third party(ies)	
Year	No.	%	No.	%	No.	%
1880	7,113	44.47%	7,975	49.86%	908	5.68%
1884	8,339	47.52%	8,346	47.56%	864	4.92%
1888	9,926	49.37%	9,602	47.76%	577	2.87%
1892	10,804	48.84%	10,747	48.58%	569	2.57%
1896	14,928	56.23%	11,029	41.55%	589	2.22%
1900	16,014	57.00%	11,010	39.19%	1,072	3.82%
1904	17,239	63.16%	8,007	29.33%	2,050	7.51%
1908	15,429	52.00%	11,101	37.41%	3,141	10.59%
1912	4,299	14.66%	9,262	31.58%	15,764	53.76%
1916	15,283	46.68%	13,829	42.24%	3,625	11.07%
1920	27,077	59.71%	12,845	28.32%	5,427	11.97%
1924	34,522	55.22%	10,223	16.35%	17,769	28.42%
1928	51,760	61.88%	30,587	36.57%	1,296	1.55%
1932	30,426	37.73%	45,436	56.34%	4,789	5.94%
1936	36,079	32.23%	73,574	65.73%	2,282	2.04%
1940	42,643	39.56%	64,567	59.90%	577	0.54%
1944	43,202	41.16%	61,057	58.17%	705	0.67%
1948	41,709	39.05%	61,901	57.95%	3,204	3.00%
1952	58,923	42.24%	80,068	57.40%	503	0.36%
1956	66,580	47.77%	72,616	52.10%	192	0.14%
1960	68,825	44.45%	85,641	55.31%	374	0.24%
1964	41,493	27.77%	107,131	71.70%	792	0.53%
1968	52,206	35.08%	81,833	54.98%	14,800	9.94%
1972	75,085	54.60%	59,322	43.13%	3,120	2.27%
1976	59,172	43.47%	74,217	54.52%	2,745	2.02%
1980	63,140	45.06%	68,627	48.97%	8,372	5.97%
1984	71,377	46.82%	79,906	52.41%	1,181	0.77%
1988	61,472	44.13%	76,710	55.07%	1,108	0.80%
1992	47,315	30.63%	69,817	45.20%	37,319	24.16%
1996	62,058	43.30%	63,686	44.43%	17,585	12.27%
2000	80,858	51.60%	71,792	45.81%	4,059	2.59%
2004	100,087	56.01%	77,774	43.52%	835	0.47%
2008	102,294	57.62%	72,721	40.96%	2,532	1.43%
2012	103,932	61.29%	63,722	37.58%	1,918	1.13%
2016	116,522	63.50%	59,669	32.52%	7,301	3.98%
2020	130,299	63.46%	72,192	35.16%	2,839	1.38%
2024	135,008	63.65%	74,904	35.32%	2,186	1.03%

United States Senate election results for Westmoreland County, Pennsylvania1
Year	Republican		Democratic		Third party(ies)	
Year	No.	%	No.	%	No.	%
1994	57,768	51.11%	51,996	46.00%	3,269	2.89%
2000	80,010	52.46%	70,201	46.03%	2,316	1.52%
2006	60,468	46.49%	69,608	53.51%	0	0.00%
2012	95,218	56.78%	69,431	41.40%	3,060	1.82%
2018	79,078	54.44%	63,778	43.91%	2,402	1.65%
2024	128,040	61.30%	75,926	36.35%	4,893	2.34%

United States Senate election results for Westmoreland County, Pennsylvania3
Year	Republican		Democratic		Third party(ies)	
Year	No.	%	No.	%	No.	%
1992	72,024	48.66%	69,777	47.15%	6,201	4.19%
1998	54,839	58.24%	34,778	36.93%	4,547	4.83%
2004	85,202	50.77%	66,030	39.35%	16,578	9.88%
2010	76,002	61.12%	48,338	38.88%	0	0.00%
2016	107,532	59.65%	62,981	34.94%	9,745	5.41%
2022	98,238	58.47%	66,240	39.43%	3,531	2.10%

Pennsylvania Gubernatorial election results for Westmoreland County
Year	Republican		Democratic		Third party(ies)	
Year	No.	%	No.	%	No.	%
1970	34,695	30.61%	75,493	66.61%	3,140	2.77%
1974	45,550	43.29%	57,951	55.08%	1,708	1.62%
1978	39,398	33.88%	76,049	65.40%	835	0.72%
1982	56,645	47.40%	61,450	51.42%	1,416	1.18%
1986	40,719	38.67%	63,473	60.28%	1,100	1.04%
1990	24,039	25.03%	71,922	74.88%	90	0.09%
1994	46,089	38.92%	48,045	40.58%	24,274	20.50%
1998	44,331	44.54%	32,375	32.53%	22,829	22.94%
2002	58,018	53.01%	48,992	44.77%	2,427	2.22%
2006	69,854	53.73%	60,145	46.27%	0	0.00%
2010	84,762	67.70%	40,440	32.30%	0	0.00%
2014	60,716	57.16%	45,501	42.84%	0	0.00%
2018	76,126	52.04%	67,950	46.45%	2,219	1.52%
2022	87,804	52.27%	77,152	45.93%	3,012	1.79%

=== County commissioners ===
Westmoreland County is administered by a three-member publicly elected commission. Each commissioner serves in four-year terms. Elections occur in the odd-numbered years that precede U.S. presidential elections. All three Commissioners are chosen in the same election, and voters may vote for no more than two candidates. By state law, the commission must include a minority party to ensure a political split on the commission. The Commissioners are responsible for the management of the county's fiscal and administrative functions.

Commissioner	Party	Title
Sean Kertes	Republican	Chairman
Ted Kopas	Democratic	Secretary
Doug Chew	Republican	Vice Chair

=== County row offices ===
Office	Official	Party
Clerk of Courts	Megan Loughner	Republican
Controller	Jeff Balzer	Republican
Coroner	Tim Carson	Republican
District Attorney	Nicole Ziccarelli	Republican
Prothonotary	Gina O'Barto	Republican
Recorder of Deeds	Frank Schiefer	Republican
Register of Wills	Jon Wian	Republican
Sheriff	James Albert	Republican
Treasurer	Jared M Squires	Republican

=== State House of Representatives ===
District	Representative	Party
55	Jill N. Cooper	Republican
56	Brian Rasel	Republican
57	Eric Nelson	Republican
58	Eric Davanzo	Republican
59	Leslie Rossi	Republican
60	Abby Major	Republican

=== State Senate ===
District	Senator	Party
32	Patrick J. Stefano	Republican
39	Kim Ward	Republican
41	Joe Pittman	Republican

=== United States House of Representatives ===
District	Representative	Party
12	Summer Lee	Democrat
14	Guy Reschenthaler	Republican

=== United States Senate ===
Senator	Party
John Fetterman	Democratic
Dave McCormick	Republican

== Education ==
=== Public school districts ===
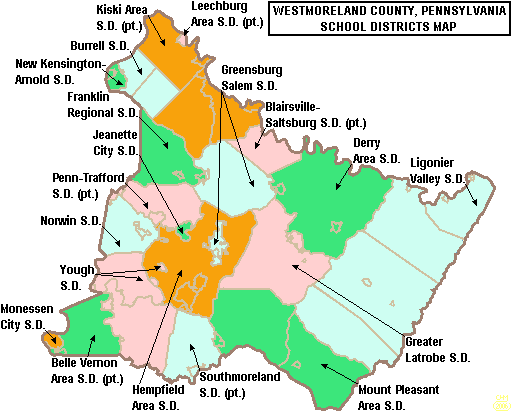
Map of Westmoreland County, Pennsylvania Public School Districts

School districts:

- Belle Vernon Area School District (Also in Fayette County)
- River Valley School District (Also in Indiana County)
- Burrell School District
- Derry Area School District
- Franklin Regional School District
- Greater Latrobe School District
- Greensburg-Salem School District
- Hempfield Area School District
- Jeannette City School District
- Kiski Area School District (Also in Armstrong County)
- Leechburg Area School District (Also in Armstrong County)
- Ligonier Valley School District
- Monessen City School District
- Mount Pleasant Area School District
- New Kensington–Arnold School District
- Norwin School District
- Penn-Trafford School District (also in Allegheny County)
- Southmoreland School District (also in Fayette County)
- Yough School District

=== Public charter schools ===
- Dr. Robert Ketterer Charter School grades 7th through 12th Latrobe (since 2008)

According to EdNA

=== Private high school ===
- Greensburg Central Catholic High School
- Kiskiminetas Springs School

=== Colleges and universities ===
- Penn State New Kensington
- Seton Hill University
- Saint Vincent College
- Westmoreland County Community College
- University of Pittsburgh at Greensburg
- Carlow University at Youngwood
- Triangle Tech

=== Additional ===
- Central Westmoreland Career and Technology Center
- Northern Westmoreland Career and Technology Center
- Eastern Westmoreland Career and Technology Center
- Valley School of Ligonier

== Economy ==
Coal mining became a major industry in the county after the Civil War, followed by the expansion of iron, steel, and glass manufacturing. The 600-acre coke works for the Isabella Furnace were built in Cokeville (then Coketown) in the Spring of 1872. At one point, company "coal patches" (towns built for miners) represented about one-third of the county's settlements. A major strike by coal miners represented by the United Mine Workers of America took place in 1910–1911; sixteen people were killed.

Volkswagen's Westmoreland plant near New Stanton in Westmoreland County was the first foreign-owned factory mass-producing automobiles in the U.S. It operated from 1978 to 1988.

The Westmoreland County Development Authority and Land Bank oversee vacant, abandoned and tax-delinquent real estate. The Land Bank may purchase such a property. The Development Authority attempts to repurpose or replace it with new construction that will revive property tax cash flow and benefit the community. Such a transaction took place in 2026 when the Land Bank purchased a vacant building in downtown Greensburg.

== Recreation ==
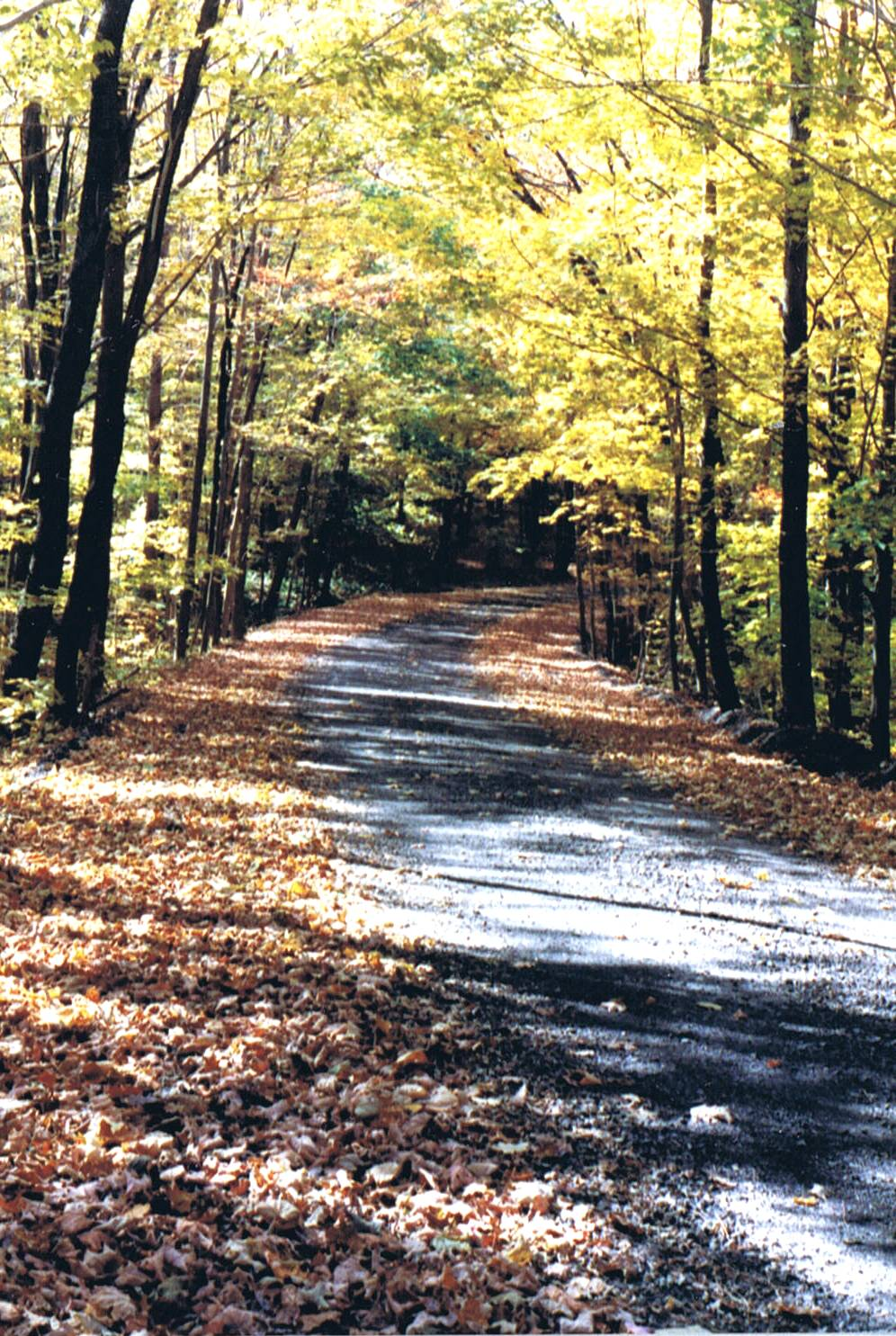
Autumn on a small state road near the Pennsylvania Turnpike in Laurel Mountains.

Westmoreland County has four Pennsylvania state parks.

- Keystone State Park
- Laurel Ridge State Park
- Laurel Summit State Park
- Linn Run State Park

Bushy Run Battlefield Park is located in Penn Township.

== Communities ==
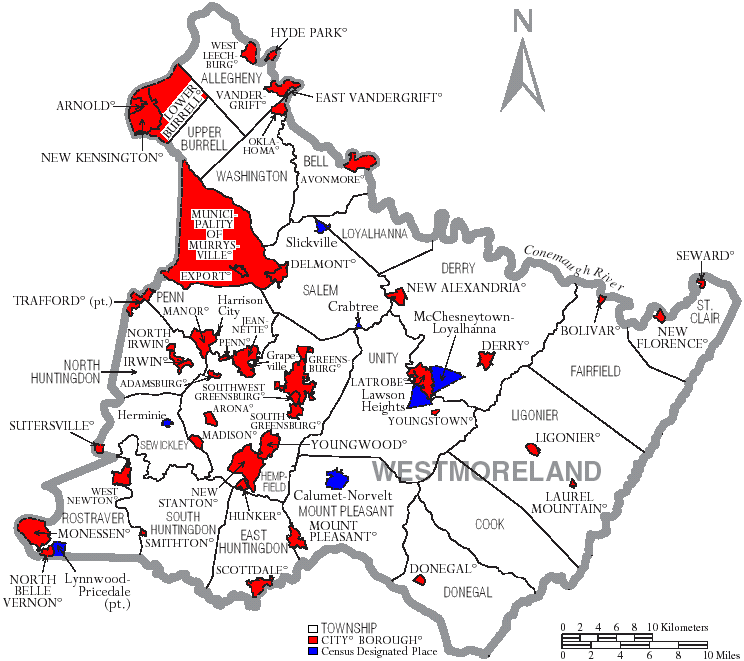
Map of Westmoreland County, Pennsylvania, with Municipal Labels showing cities and boroughs (red), Townships (white), and Census-designated places (blue).

Under Pennsylvania law, there are four types of incorporated municipalities: cities, boroughs, townships, and, in at most two cases, towns. The following cities, boroughs, and townships are located in Westmoreland County:

=== Cities ===
- Arnold
- Greensburg (county seat)
- Jeannette
- Latrobe
- Lower Burrell
- Monessen
- New Kensington

=== Boroughs ===
- Adamsburg
- Arona
- Avonmore
- Bolivar
- Delmont
- Derry
- Donegal
- East Vandergrift
- Export
- Hunker
- Hyde Park
- Irwin
- Laurel Mountain
- Ligonier
- Madison
- Manor
- Mount Pleasant
- Murrysville
- New Alexandria
- New Florence
- New Stanton
- North Belle Vernon
- North Irwin
- Oklahoma
- Penn
- Scottdale
- Seward
- Smithton
- South Greensburg
- Southwest Greensburg
- Sutersville
- Trafford (partly in Allegheny County)
- Vandergrift
- West Leechburg
- West Newton
- Youngstown
- Youngwood

=== Townships ===
- Allegheny
- Bell
- Cook
- Derry
- Donegal
- East Huntingdon
- Fairfield
- Hempfield
- Ligonier
- Loyalhanna
- Mount Pleasant
- North Huntingdon
- Penn
- Rostraver
- St. Clair
- Salem
- Sewickley
- South Huntingdon
- Unity
- Upper Burrell
- Washington

=== Census-designated places ===
Census-designated places are geographical areas designated by the U.S. Census Bureau for the purposes of compiling demographic data. They are not actual jurisdictions under Pennsylvania law. Other unincorporated communities, such as villages, may also be listed here.

- Bradenville
- Calumet
- Collinsburg
- Crabtree
- Fellsburg
- Grapeville
- Harrison City
- Herminie
- Hostetter
- Lawson Heights
- Level Green
- Loyalhanna
- Lynnwood Pricedale
- Mammoth
- Millwood
- Norvelt
- St. Vincent College
- Slickville
- Webster
- Wyano
- Yukon

=== Unincorporated communities ===
- Acme
- Alverton
- Ardara
- Armbrust
- Baggaley
- Bessemer
- Blackstone
- Boquet
- Bovard
- Brenizer
- Carbon
- Claridge
- Forbes Road
- Greenwald
- Hannastown
- Hopewell
- Hutchinson
- Jacobs Creek
- Jones Mills
- Kecksburg
- Larimer
- Laughlintown
- Lloydsville
- Lowber
- Luxor
- Marguerite
- Morewood
- Moween
- New Derry
- Pandora
- Peanut
- Pleasant Unity
- Reagantown
- Rector
- Reduction
- Ruffs Dale
- Salina
- Scab Hill
- Seger
- Southwest
- Stahlstown
- Standard Shaft
- Tarrs
- Torrance
- Trauger
- Turkeytown
- United
- Wendel
- Westmoreland City
- Whitney
- Yohoghany

=== Former community ===
- Cokeville / Coketown
- Livermore, Pennsylvania
- Franklin Township - now known as Murrysville, Pennsylvania

=== Population ranking ===
The population ranking of the following table is based on the 2010 census of Westmoreland County.

† county seat

Rank	City/Town/etc.	Municipal type	Population (2010 Census)
1	Murrysville	Municipality	20,079
2	† Greensburg	City	14,892
3	New Kensington	City	13,116
4	Lower Burrell	City	11,761
5	Jeannette	City	9,654
6	Latrobe	City	8,338
7	Monessen	City	7,720
8	Vandergrift	Borough	5,205
9	Arnold	City	5,157
10	Mount Pleasant	Borough	4,454
11	Scottdale	Borough	4,384
12	Level Green	CDP	4,020
13	Irwin	Borough	3,973
14	Loyalhanna	CDP	3,428
15	Manor	Borough	3,239
16	Trafford (partially in Allegheny County)	Borough	3,174
17	Youngwood	Borough	3,050
18	Derry	Borough	2,688
19	Delmont	Borough	2,686
20	West Newton	Borough	2,633
21	Lawson Heights	CDP	2,194
22	New Stanton	Borough	2,173
23	Southwest Greensburg	Borough	2,155
24	South Greensburg	Borough	2,117
25	Lynnwood-Pricedale	CDP	2,031
26	North Belle Vernon	Borough	1,971
27	Ligonier	Borough	1,573
28	St. Vincent College	CDP	1,357
29	West Leechburg	Borough	1,294
30	Calumet	CDP	1,241
31	Fellsburg	CDP	1,180
32	Collinsburg	CDP	1,125
33	Avonmore	Borough	1,011
34	Norvelt	CDP	948
35	Export	Borough	917
36	North Irwin	Borough	846
37	Oklahoma	Borough	809
38	Herminie	CDP	789
39	Hostetter	CDP	740
40	New Florence	Borough	689
41	Yukon	CDP	677
42	East Vandergrift	Borough	674
43	Sutersville	Borough	605
44	Millwood	CDP	566
45	New Alexandria	Borough	560
46	Bradenville	CDP	545
47	Grapeville	CDP	538
48	Mammoth	CDP	525
49	Hyde Park	Borough	500
50	Seward	Borough	495
51	Wyano	CDP	484
52	Penn	Borough	475
53	Bolivar	Borough	465
54	Smithton	Borough	399
55	Madison	Borough	397
56	Slickville	CDP	388
57	Arona	Borough	370
58	Youngstown	Borough	326
59	Hunker	Borough	291
60	Crabtree	CDP	277
61	Webster	CDP	255
62	Adamsburg	Borough	172
63	Laurel Mountain	Borough	167
64	Harrison City	CDP	134
65	Donegal	Borough	120

== Notable people ==
- David Alter, born in Westmoreland County, noted inventor
- Pete Babando, former NHL Hockey player, played for 1950 Stanley Cup champions Detroit Red Wings, born in Braeburn neighborhood of the City of Lower Burrell.
- George Blanda, Hall of Fame football player, born in Youngwood.
- D.J. Coffman, comic book artist and writer, creator of Hero By Night. Born in Mt. Pleasant. Resides in Scottdale.
- Johnny Costa, jazz pianist, was born and raised in Arnold.
- Jesse Root Grant, (father of Ulysses S. Grant, General & President) born in Greensburg.
- Shirley Jones, Academy Award-winning actress and singer, grew up in Smithton.
- Sheila Kelley, American actor, born and raised in Greensburg, Pa. Founder of Sheila Kelley S Factor exercise and lifestyle program.
- Stephanie Kwolek, chemist and inventor of Kevlar, born in New Kensington.
- Bill Mazeroski, Hall of Fame baseball player
- Michael Moorer, boxer
- A. Milton Musser, Latter-day Saint pioneer, missionary, traveling bishop, and historian, born in Donegal
- Arnold Palmer, golfer, was born and raised in Latrobe.
- Terrelle Pryor NFL quarterback, attended Jeannette High School.
- Fred Rogers, television personality, was born, raised, and lived in Latrobe; buried in Unity Cemetery, Unity Township, just outside Latrobe.
- Arthur St. Clair, American Revolution Major General, Patriot, 9th President of the Continental Congress, buried in Greensburg, Pa.
- Willie Thrower, football player, was born and raised in New Kensington.
- Jim White, KMOX radio talk show host, born and raised in Greensburg, Pa.
- Jacob Zimmerman (born 1831), newspaper editor, newspaper owner, Illinois politician, mine owner, real estate entrepreneur, and businessman.

== See also ==
- National Register of Historic Places listings in Westmoreland County, Pennsylvania
- Westmoreland Choral Society
