= Fellsburg =

Fellsburg may refer to:

- Fellsburg, Kansas, an unincorporated community in Edwards County
- Fellsburg, Pennsylvania, a census-designated place in Westmoreland County
