= Norwin =

Norwin may refer to:

- Norwin School District, Pennsylvania, USA
- Norwin, Queensland, a locality in Australia
