= Pennsylvania Interscholastic Marching Band Association =

High school marching bands from the United States

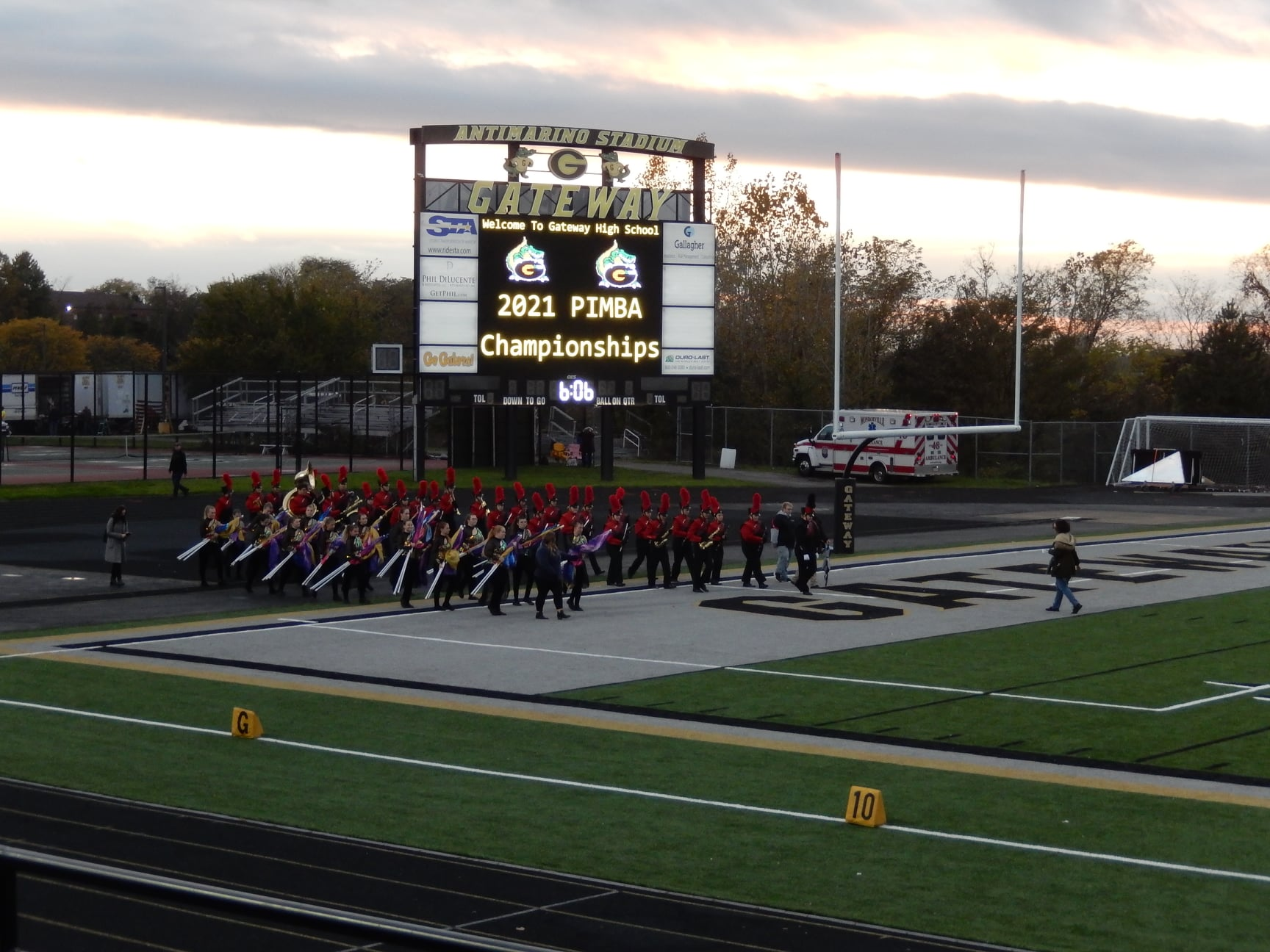
- Class A champions, Southmoreland High School, preparing to perform in the 2021 PIMBA Championships.
- Abbreviation: PIMBA
- Founded: 1996
- Location: Greater Pittsburgh, Pennsylvania, United States
- Website: www.pimba.org
- Remarks: PFCJ (Pennsylvania Federation of Contest Judges) division

The Pennsylvania Interscholastic Marching Band Association (PIMBA) is a nonprofit organization that provides competitive adjudications for high school marching bands in southwestern Pennsylvania. Founded in 1996 (replacing the now-defunct PFCJ marching band circuit), PIMBA coordinates with local high schools to host band competitions throughout the fall, culminating in the PIMBA Championships.

== Background ==
PIMBA events provide both healthy competition and constructive feedback for performing bands. Directors pay membership dues in order for their ensemble to be classified as a member of the circuit. Classifications are broken down by the number of performing students in an ensemble. The current classifications are as follows:

- Class A: 1–54 members
- Class AA: 55– 74 members
- Class AAA: 75–99 members
- Class AAAA: 100+ members

Directors may also choose to have their ensemble perform in judged exhibition or Festival Class. These bands will not be placed but will still receive judges' commentary and an individual score. From 1997 to 2012, PIMBA also featured a National Class– qualifications for this class included placing in the top five at BOA Regional competitions for two consecutive years or by special request of the director. The final competition to take place for each season is the PIMBA Championships. At the championships, bands receive final scoring in their respective classes with the top scoring band from each class being crowned a PIMBA Class Champion. The championships has historically been held at the following locations:

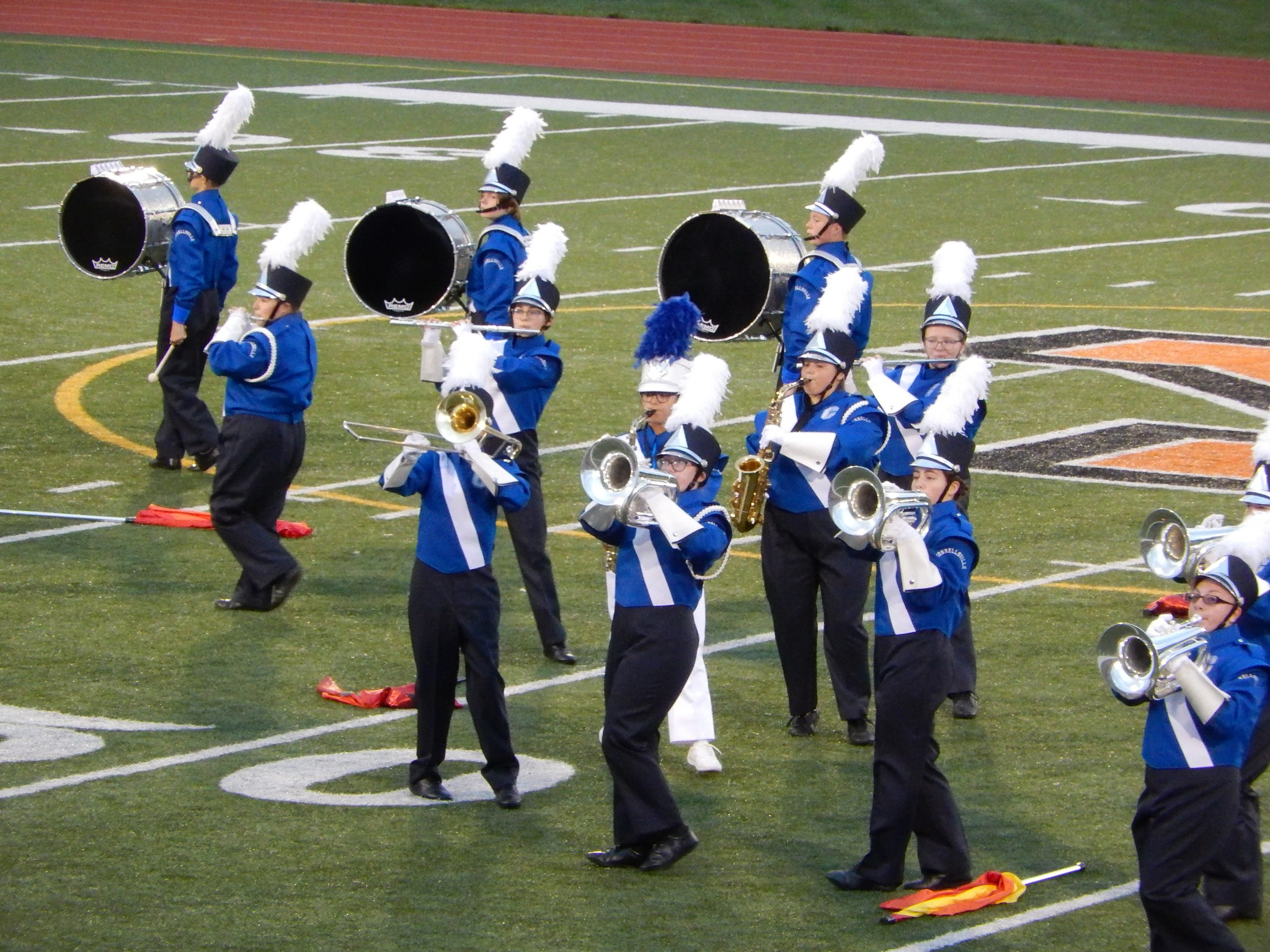
Connellsville Area Senior High School's Mighty Falcon Marching Band performing at a competition in 2022.

- Elizabeth Forward High School– 3 times (2003, 2005, 2007)
- Gateway High School– 9 times (2008, 2009, 2013, 2015, 2017, 2019, 2021, 2024, 2026)
- Moon Area High School– 3 times (2016, 2018, and 2023)
- North Allegheny Senior High School– 1 time (1996)
- Norwin High School– 5 times (2000, 2002, 2006, 2011, and 2022)
- Penn-Trafford High School– 6 times (1999, 2001, 2004, 2010, 2012, and 2014)
- South Park High School– 1 time (1998)
- Deer Lakes– 1 time (2025)

Scoring is based upon the same system used by Bands of America, featuring a Musical Performance category (worth 20 points), a Visual Performance category (worth 20 points), and a General Effect category (worth 60 points). Unlike BOA, the raw total from these three categories is divided by two and raised by 50 to establish an ensemble's final score.

== PIMBA Championship Results: 1996-2025 ==
Throughout PIMBA's history, there have been 28 Championship competitions. Several historical caveats should be noted:

- 1996: AAAA was referred to as Open Class
- 1997-2012: National Class was introduced and lasted for 15 seasons
- 1999: No Class AAA, AAAA, or National Class Champions (Field Washout)
- 2019: No Class AAA or AAAA Champions (Weather Cancellation)
- 2020: No PIMBA Festivals or Championships (COVID-19)

Below is a historical catalogue of each class champion band, including their respective scores and show titles if known. Next to the name of the champion in parentheses is the # of times that band has been crowned a class champion. Additional Note: the current scoring system for PIMBA was introduced in the 2004 season with revisions also being made for the 2013 and 2018 seasons, respectively.

Champion by Year and Classification
	Class A	Class AA	Class AAA	Class AAAA	National Class (1997-2012)
1996	North Catholic^{(1)}	Mars Area^{(1)} The Beatles 87.100	East Allegheny^{(1)}	Kiski Area^{(1)} The Music of Gershwin	
1997	Serra Catholic^{(1)}	Beaver Area^{(1)} Damn Yankees	Gateway^{(1)} Slavonic Dances	West Allegheny^{(1)}	Norwin^{(1)} Hollywood Classics
1998	No Participants in Class	Mars Area^{(2)} The Music of Buddy Rich 87.700	Gateway^{(2)} Emotions of the Soul 92.450	McKeesport^{(1)} Earth, Wind, and Fire 89.400	Norwin^{(2)} Kozhevnikov's "Symphony #3" 96.600
1999	South Park^{(1)}	Mars Area^{(3)} Swingin' into the Next Millennium	Cancelled: No Champion		
2000	South Park^{(2)}	Mars Area^{(4)} Lucy's Back with an Attitude 86.000	West Allegheny^{(2)} Jesus Christ Superstar	Gateway^{(3)} The Odyssey	Norwin^{(3)} Reflections of Earth
2001	Beaver Area^{(2)} Les Misérables 81.750	Southmoreland^{(1)} The Jackson Five 87.900	Deer Lakes^{(1)} Fiddler on the Roof 89.800	Trinity^{(1)} - 92.850	Norwin^{(4)} Knights of Honour 94.950
2002	Beaver Area^{(3)} 82.700	Elizabeth Forward^{(1)} Pianoforte 81.600	Mars Area^{(5)} City of Angels 91.150	Trinity^{(2)} 88.650	Kiski Area^{(2)} Route 66: Enjoy the Ride 96.150
2003	Cochranton^{(1)}^{-} 82.350	East Allegheny^{(2)} The Music of Gershwin 81.200	Mars Area^{(6)} Going Slightly Insane 91.000	Trinity^{(3)} The Music of Chase 88.350	Kiski Area^{(3)} Head, Hands, and Feet 95.800
2004	Quaker Valley^{(1)} Cirque du Soleil 84.825	Blackhawk^{(1)} - 90.025	Gateway^{(4)} Locomotion 92.500	Trinity^{(4)} Once Upon A Time 90.025	Norwin^{(5)} Fiesta! 96.475
2005	Beaver Area^{(4)} - 83.300	Fox Chapel^{(1)} - 89.125	Gateway^{(5)} Reflections 91.675	Trinity^{(5)} Wicked 89.950	Norwin^{(6)} Grooves in Motion 94.350
2006	Deer Lakes^{(2)} Cirque du Soleil 83.525	Fox Chapel^{(2)} Paint Me a Picture 86.650	West Allegheny^{(3)} Black, White, and Red All Over 88.225	Trinity^{(6)}: 89.425	Kiski Area^{(4)} Viva Las Vegas 94.625
2007	Beaver Area^{(5)} - 82.875	Blackhawk^{(2)} Sesame Street 89.100	Gateway^{(6)} From the New World 90.975	Trinity^{(7)} - 90.575	Kiski Area^{(5)} The Rhythm of Life 94.450
2008	Fox Chapel^{(3)} Out of the Box 85.650	Mars Area^{(7)} Songs of the Beatles 87.800	Trinity^{(8)} Cloudburst 90.300	Gateway^{(7)} Canon 92.200	Kiski Area^{(6)} Click 95.450
2009	Cochranton^{(2)} Clockworks 86.400	Mars Area^{(8)} Blood, Sweat, and Tears 86.450	Trinity^{(9)} Frequency 85.325	Gateway^{(8)} Winter Sketches 88.825	Kiski Area^{(7)} Pursuit 94.550
2010	Fox Chapel^{(4)} Rebound 84.825	Blackhawk^{(3)} This is Halloween 86.475	Mars Area^{(9)} The Music of Kansas 86.150	Moon Area^{(1)} Renaissance 88.800	Kiski Area^{(8)} Imaginarium 93.350
2011	Deer Lakes^{(3)} Rivers 79.525	Blackhawk^{(4)} The Wicked Wiz of Oz 86.350	Trinity^{(10)} Kaleidoscope 85.625	Moon Area^{(2)} To the Top 89.575	Norwin^{(7)} Salvation 93.300
2012	East Allegheny^{(3)} Only the Good Die Young 77.775	McGuffey^{(1)} New Orleans Sketches 80.175	West Allegheny^{(4)} Brazil 83.425	Gateway^{(9)} Beyond the Forest's Edge 87.675	Norwin^{(8)} The Road to You 93.200
2013	Blackhawk^{(5)} Les Misérables 83.725	Mars Area^{(10)} A Night in the City 86.725	Gateway^{(10)} It Just Ain't Right 90.000	Norwin^{(9)} The Rise of the Knight 93.600	
2014	Blackhawk^{(6)} Mirage 80.850	Mars Area^{(11)} Phantom of the Opera 86.000	Gateway^{(11)} Flashback 88.775	Norwin^{(10)} When Worlds Collide 92.800	
2015	Blackhawk^{(7)} Through the Window 78.225	Deer Lakes^{(4)} The Hero in Us All 80.725	Gateway^{(12)} Egyptian Impressions 86.875	Kiski Area^{(9)} Origins 90.975	
2016	Leechburg^{(1)} The Drake Equation 77.75	Deer Lakes^{(5)} MI-6: The 007 Archives 80.475	Gateway^{(13)} Puppet Master 84.750	Norwin^{(11)} Con4mity 89.775	
2017	Leechburg^{(2)} Connected 80.125	Southmoreland^{(2)} I am... 83.825	Mars Area^{(12)} Beethoven: Artistry in Motion 85.400	Norwin^{(12)} RunAway 92.350	
2018	Blackhawk^{(8)} A Darkness Beckons 76.325	Deer Lakes^{(6)} Stories from the West Side 80.710	Gateway^{(14)} Enigma 86.710	Kiski Area^{(10)} Out of the Blue 92.790	
2019	Leechburg^{(3)} - 77.150	Fox Chapel Area^{(5)} Conquest 81.075	Cancelled: No Champion		
2021	Southmoreland^{(3)} Through the Dark 81.400	Mars Area^{(13)} Missing U 87.150	Moon Area^{(3)} On the Edge 89.250	Kiski Area^{(11)} Beneath the Shifting Sands 93.050	
2022	Southmoreland^{(4)} Pieces of One 85.675	Mars Area^{(14)} A World up in Flames 89.675	Moon Area^{(4)} Look at the Stars 91.575	Kiski Area^{(12)} Corners of My Mind 94.90	
2023	Southmoreland^{(5)} Rise and Shine 85.575	Mars Area^{(15)} Oh, What Tangled Webs We Weave 86.550	Mt. Lebanon^{(1)} Blackbird Set Free 90.675	Kiski Area^{(13)} Hidden Within 95.725	
2024	Deer Lakes^{(7)} Shine Through 87.825	Gateway^{(15)} Breaking Darkness 86.175	Mt. Lebanon^{(2)} Ladies of the Eighties 88.350	Kiski Area^{(14)} On Gossamer Wings 94.400	
2025	Mars Area^{(16)} Let It Be 83.10	Fox Chapel Area^{(6)} From the Ashes 86.375	Moon Area^{(5)} It Starts with a Spark 91.000	Kiski Area^{(15)} Strings Attached 94.350	
2026	Mars Area^{(17)} Best in Show 83.875	Deer Lakes^{(8)} The Prince of Thieves 84.500	Fox Chapel^{(7)} Off the Rails 84.150	Norwin^{(13)} Off the Record 93.275	

The five winningest class champion bands:

- Mars Area High School (17 times; A/AA/AAA)
- Gateway High School (15 times; AA/AAA/AAAA)
- Kiski Area High School (15 times; AAAA/National)
- Norwin Senior High School (13 times; AAAA/National)
- Trinity High School (10 times; AAA/AAAA)
