= Adamsburg, Pennsylvania =

Borough in Pennsylvania, US

- Borough
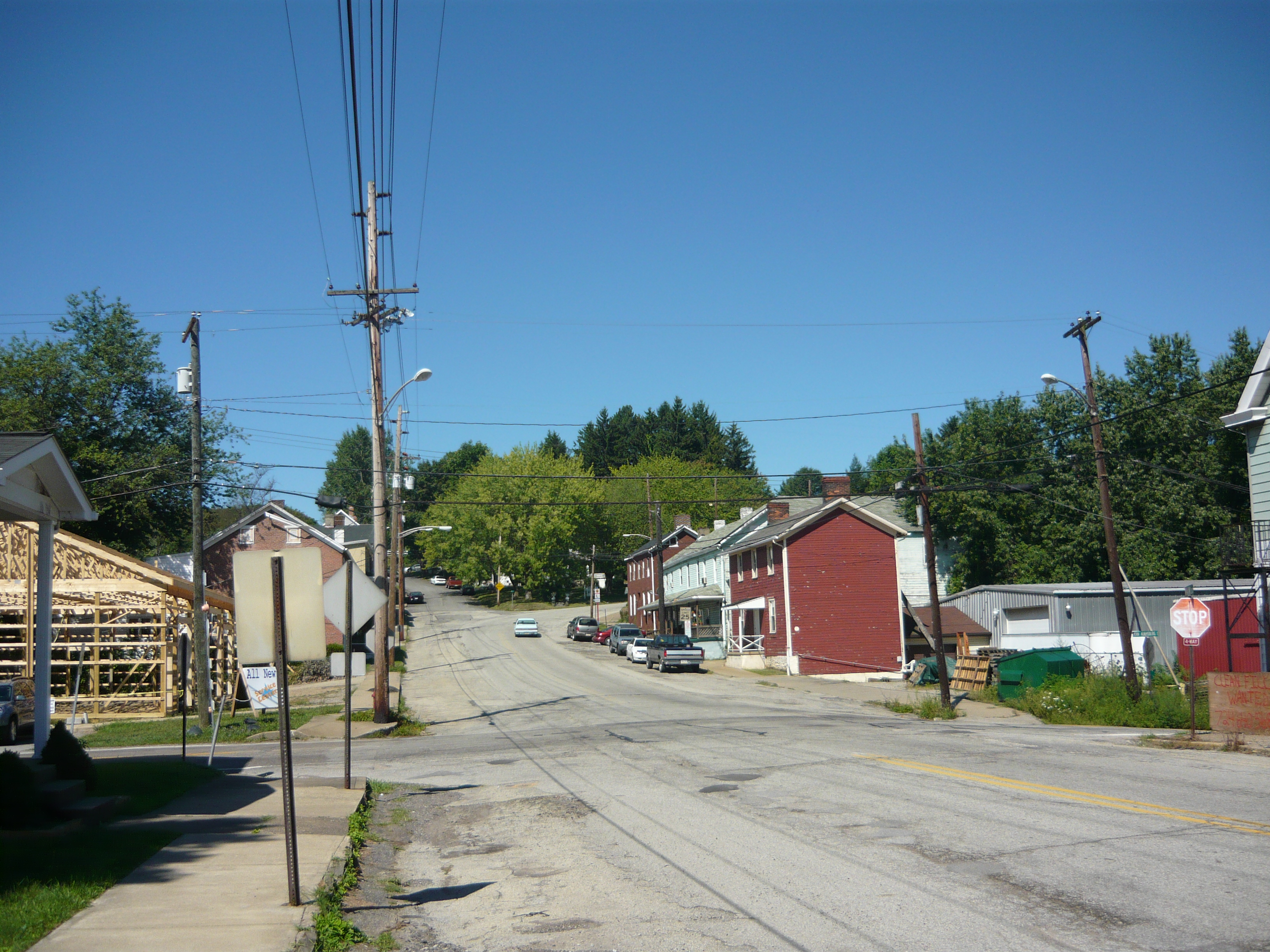
- Main Street

- Location of Adamsburg in Westmoreland County, Pennsylvania.

- Location within Pennsylvania
- Coordinates: 40°18′38″N 79°39′16″W
- Country: United States
- State: Pennsylvania
- County: Westmoreland
- Incorporated: March 5, 1841

Government
  - Type: Borough Council

Area
  - Total: 0.28 sq mi (0.73 km^{2})
  - Land: 0.28 sq mi (0.73 km^{2})
  - Water: 0 sq mi (0.00 km^{2})
- Elevation: 1,155 ft (352 m)

Population (2020)
  - Total: 142
  - Density: 506.4/sq mi (195.52/km^{2})
- Time zone: UTC-5 (Eastern (EST))
  - Summer (DST): UTC-4 (EDT)
- Zip code: 15611
- FIPS code: 42-00332
- Website: https://www.adamsburg.org/

Adamsburg is a borough that is located in Westmoreland County, Pennsylvania, United States. The population was 144 at the time of the 2020 federal census.

== History ==
This Pennsylvania borough was named for John Quincy Adams, sixth President of the United States.

== Geography ==
Adamsburg is located at 40°18′38″N 79°39′16″W (40.310501, -79.654423).

According to the United States Census Bureau, the borough has a total area of 0.3 square miles (0.8 km^{2}), all land.

== Demographics ==
Historical population
Census	Pop.	Note	%±
1850	253		—
1860	236		−6.7%
1870	229		−3.0%
1880	199		−13.1%
1890	223		12.1%
1900	184		−17.5%
1910	300		63.0%
1920	246		−18.0%
1930	227		−7.7%
1940	210		−7.5%
1950	238		13.3%
1960	191		−19.7%
1970	251		31.4%
1980	236		−6.0%
1990	257		8.9%
2000	221		−14.0%
2010	172		−22.2%
2020	142		−17.4%
2021 (est.)	143	▲	0.7%

At the time of the 2000 census, there were 221 people, eighty-four households, and sixty-three families living in the borough.

The population density was 838.3 inhabitants per square mile (323.7/km^{2}). There were 92 housing units at an average density of 349.0 per square mile (134.7/km^{2}).

The racial makeup of the borough was 100.00% White. Hispanic or Latino of any race were 0.90%.

Of the eighty-four households documented in the borough, 33.3% had children who were under the age of eighteen living with them, 54.8% were married couples living together, 15.5% had a female householder with no husband present, and 25.0% were non-families. 21.4% of households were one-person households and 7.1% were one-person households with residents who were sixty-five years of age or older.

The average household size was 2.40 and the average family size was 2.75.

The age distribution was 18.6% of residents who were under the age of eighteen, 11.3% who were aged eighteen to twenty-four, 25.3% who were aged twenty-five to forty-four, 24.0% who were aged forty-five to sixty-four, and 20.8% who were aged sixty-five or older. The median age was forty-two years.

For every one hundred females, there were 90.5 males. For every one hundred females who were aged eighteen or older, there were 81.8 males.

The median household income was $38,750 and the median family income was $45,000. Males had a median income of $29,000 versus $18,958 for females.

The per capita income for the borough was $17,172.

Approximately 9.4% of families and 10.4% of the population were living below the poverty line, including 9.1% of those who were under the age of eighteen; however, none of those who were documented as being sixty-five or older were living in poverty.

== Surrounding communities ==
- Jeannette
- Arona
- Irwin
- Penn

== Notable person ==
- Bill Bishop, baseball player
