= Cokeville, Pennsylvania =

Former community in Pennsylvania, US

Cokeville
- Unincorporated community
- Location within the state of Pennsylvania Cokeville (the United States)
- Coordinates: 40°25′6″N 79°15′20″W
- Country: United States
- State: Pennsylvania
- County: Westmoreland
- Elevation: 938 ft (286 m)
- Time zone: UTC-5 (Eastern (EST))
  - Summer (DST): UTC-4 (EDT)
- GNIS feature ID: 1170039

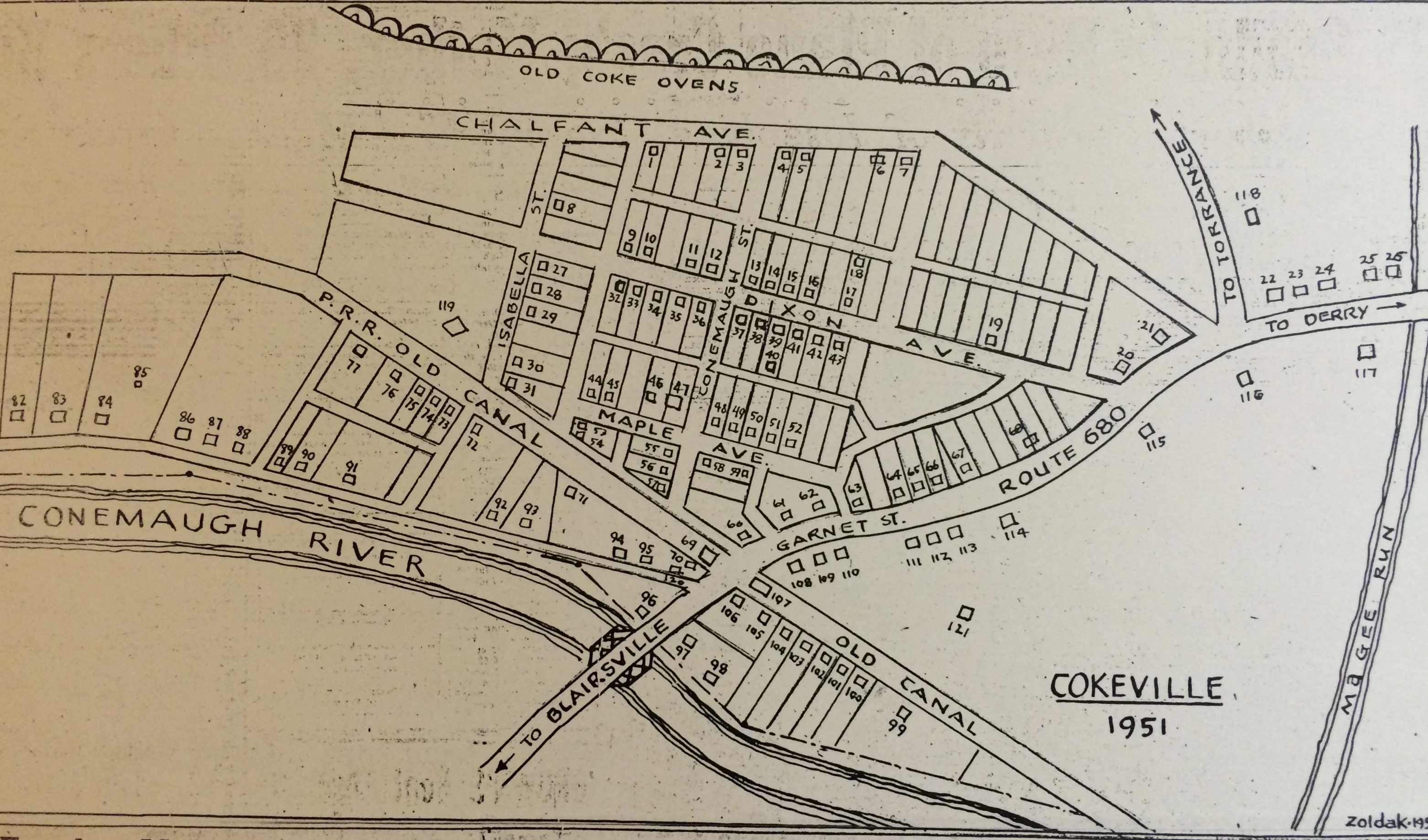
Map of Cokeville PA, from the Blairsville Dispatch, January 3, 1952

Cokeville was a town in Westmoreland County, Pennsylvania, United States. Following the St. Patrick's Day flood of 1936, the Army Corps of Engineers began planning a dam project on the Conemaugh River to harness the flood waters. There were 122 structures in Cokeville on a 1951 map. In 1952, as the town was being evacuated for the flood control project, most of these structures were razed, but some were moved up the hill to Cokeville Heights near Rt. 217.

The town traces its roots back to 1858 when it was known as Broad Fording. Cokeville was served by the Pennsylvania Mainline Canal until the Pennsylvania Railroad located its tracks along the canals towpath around 1864. The name was changed in the early 1870s to Coketown, Coketon, and finally Cokeville after The Isabella Furnace Coke Company erected a 200 oven coke plant on the hillside above the town in 1872. The town was incorporated in 1887. The coke produced here was shipped to the Isabella Blast Furnace in Etna, Pennsylvania on the Allegheny River. The H.C. Frick Coke Company took over the operation around 1901 and the ovens went out permanently in 1903.

The only remnants of the town today are the bridge abutments of the road bridge from Blairsville, the railroad bridge abutments a little further up the river and about a dozen badly dilapidated coke ovens just below the large field behind Torrance State Hospital. There are still concrete roads on the two sides of the town.

== See also ==
- List of ghost towns in Pennsylvania
