= Norwin School District =

School district in Pennsylvania

Coordinates: 40.318°N 79.717°W

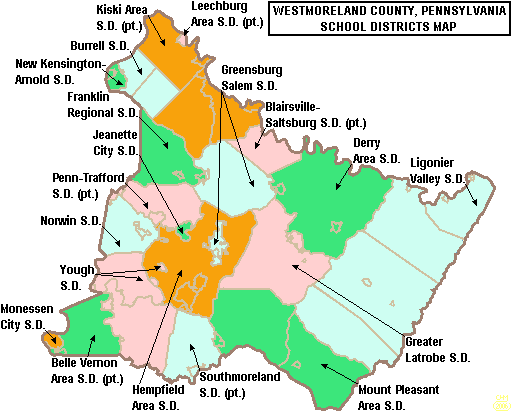
- 281 McMahon Drive North Huntingdon, Pennsylvania

District information
- Type: Public
- Motto: “Moving Forward from Great to Extraordinary”
- Grades: K-12
- Established: 1958

Students and staff
- Athletic conference: Western Pennsylvania Interscholastic Athletic League
- District mascot: Knight
- Colors: Blue & Gold

Other information
- Website: norwinsd.org

Norwin School District is a large, suburban public school district located in Westmoreland County, Pennsylvania (a small portion of the district also extends into Allegheny County).

== Demographics ==
Norwin School District serves North Huntingdon, Irwin, and North Irwin, which are Pittsburgh suburbs. It covers 28 square miles (73 km^{2}) and was home to approximately 34,000 residents in 2000. By 2010, the district's population increased to 35,514. In 2009, the district's residents' per capita income was $20,393, while the median family income was $50,728.

The district contains four elementary schools (grades K-4) along with Hillcrest Intermediate School (grades 5–6), Norwin Middle School (grades 7–8), and Norwin High School (grades 9–12). Norwin High School also utilizes the Central Westmoreland Career and Technology Center in New Stanton for vocational and technical programs.

== Extracurriculars ==
Norwin School District offers a wide variety of extracurricular activities. Norwin High School offers eighteen varsity-level sports: Baseball, Basketball, Bocce, Bowling, Cheerleading, Cross Country, Field Hockey, Football, Golf, Ice Hockey, Lacrosse, Soccer, Softball, Swimming, Tennis, Track & Field, Volleyball, and Wrestling.
