= Bradenville, Pennsylvania =

Unincorporated community in Pennsylvania, US

- Census-designated place
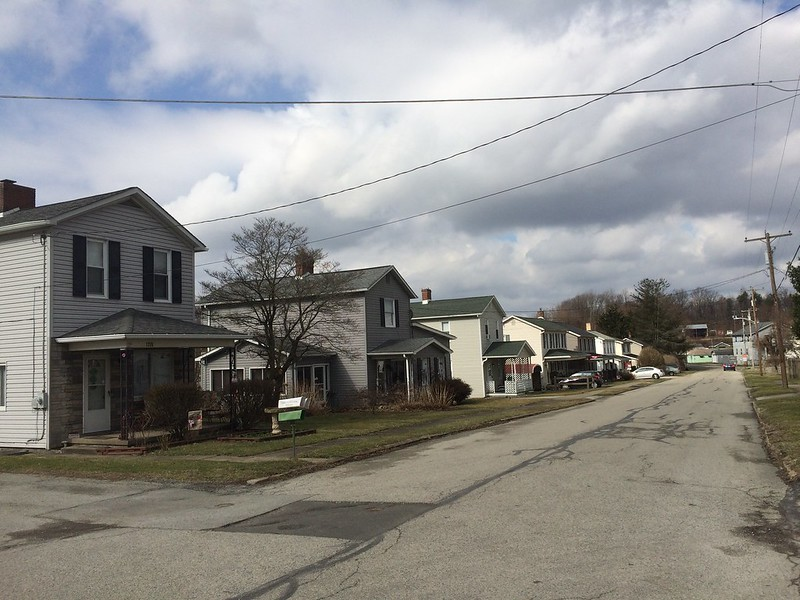
- Houses on High Street

- Location within the state of Pennsylvania Bradenville, Pennsylvania (the United States)
- Coordinates: 40°19′17″N 79°20′24″W
- Country: United States
- State: Pennsylvania
- County: Westmoreland

Area
  - Total: 0.41 sq mi (1.06 km^{2})
  - Land: 0.41 sq mi (1.06 km^{2})
  - Water: 0 sq mi (0.00 km^{2})
- Elevation: 1,099 ft (335 m)

Population (2020)
  - Total: 487
  - Density: 1,190.3/sq mi (459.56/km^{2})
- Time zone: UTC-5 (Eastern (EST))
  - Summer (DST): UTC-4 (EDT)
- ZIP codes: 15620
- FIPS code: 42-08024
- GNIS feature ID: 1170128

Bradenville is a census-designated place and coal town in Derry Township, Westmoreland County, Pennsylvania, United States. The community is located within two miles of the city of Latrobe and is three miles from the borough of Derry.

It has a total area of 0.4 square mile. Bradenville has its own post office, with zip code 15620.

== Demographics ==
Historical population
| Census | Pop. | Note | %± |
|---|---|---|---|
| 2020 | 487 | | — |
U.S. Decennial Census

According to 2018 estimates, Bradenville has 396 residents. The estimated median household income is $38,551, compared to the national average of $61,937.

The estimated poverty rate is 26.3%, compared to the national average of 13.1%. 100% of Bradenville residents are white, and 85.6% are high school graduates or higher.

== History ==
The town was originally called St. Clair City. Served by the Pennsylvania Railroad, it supported coal mining and coking operations beginning in 1886, operated under the names St. Clair Mine & Coke Works, Bradenville Mine & Coke Works and Duquesne Mine & Coke Works.

Mathias W. Saxman's Bradenville Mine & Coke Works built about 40 company houses and a store in the town around 1914. By 1915, its Bradenville Mine employed 195 persons, produced over 110,000 tons of coal and operated 194 beehive coke ovens. The Bradenville Mine ceased operations in 1951.

Researchers in 1994 found that while the store (see Gallery section) and company houses survived, no mine structures remained.

== Mine subsidence ==
There were 17 mine subsidence events in Bradenville over the approximately 20 years prior to 2018. Mine subsidence can occur when the ground above an underground (often abandoned) mine collapses into the mine cavity below. This creates the potential for structural damage to surface infrastructure such as homes, buildings and roads.

Bradenville's subsidence problems are believed to be related to the Derry No. 1 Deep Mine owned by Marcus W. Saxman's Latrobe-Connellsville Coal & Coke Company, which mined the area beneath the town. In 2020, the Pennsylvania Department of Environmental Protection began a $5.8 million project to stabilize about 150 homes in the town affected by this problem.

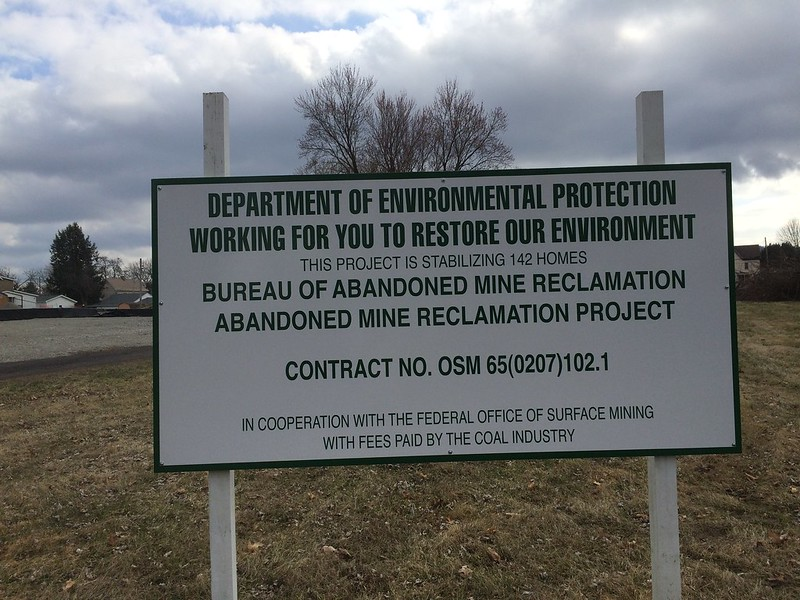
Stabilizing houses damaged by mine subsidence

== Gallery ==
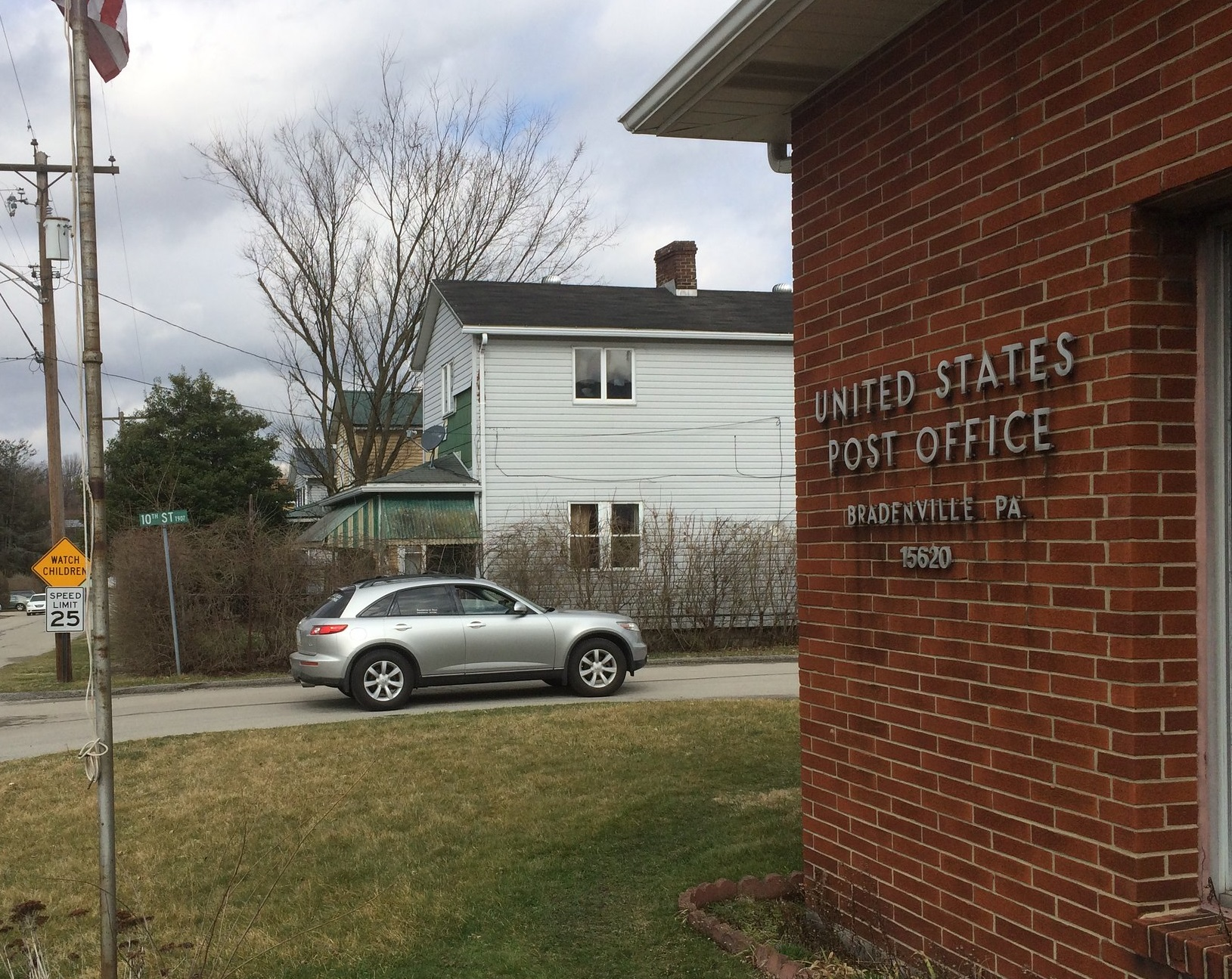
Post office, High Street

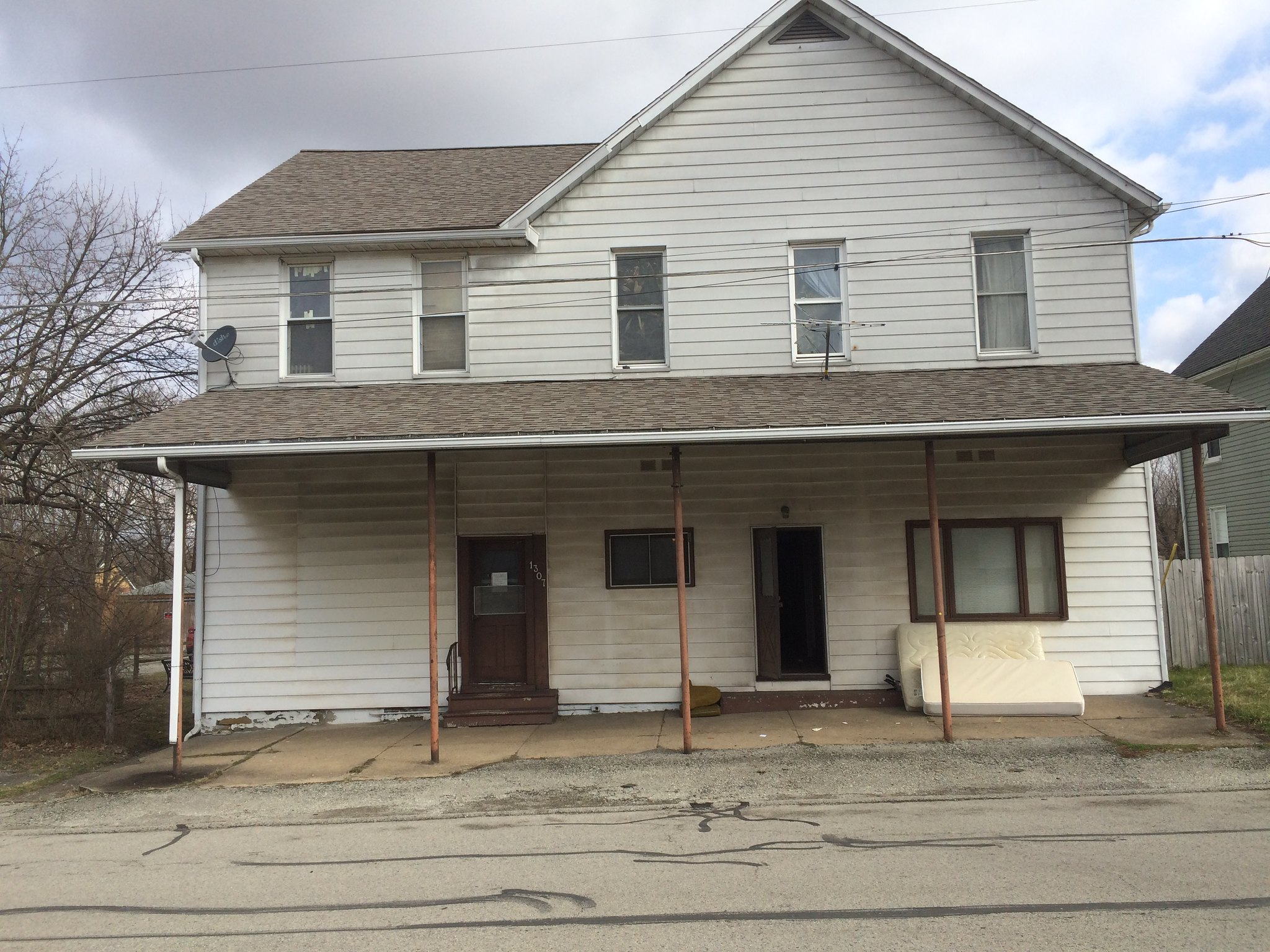
Former company store, Bradenville Mine & Coke Works, High Street

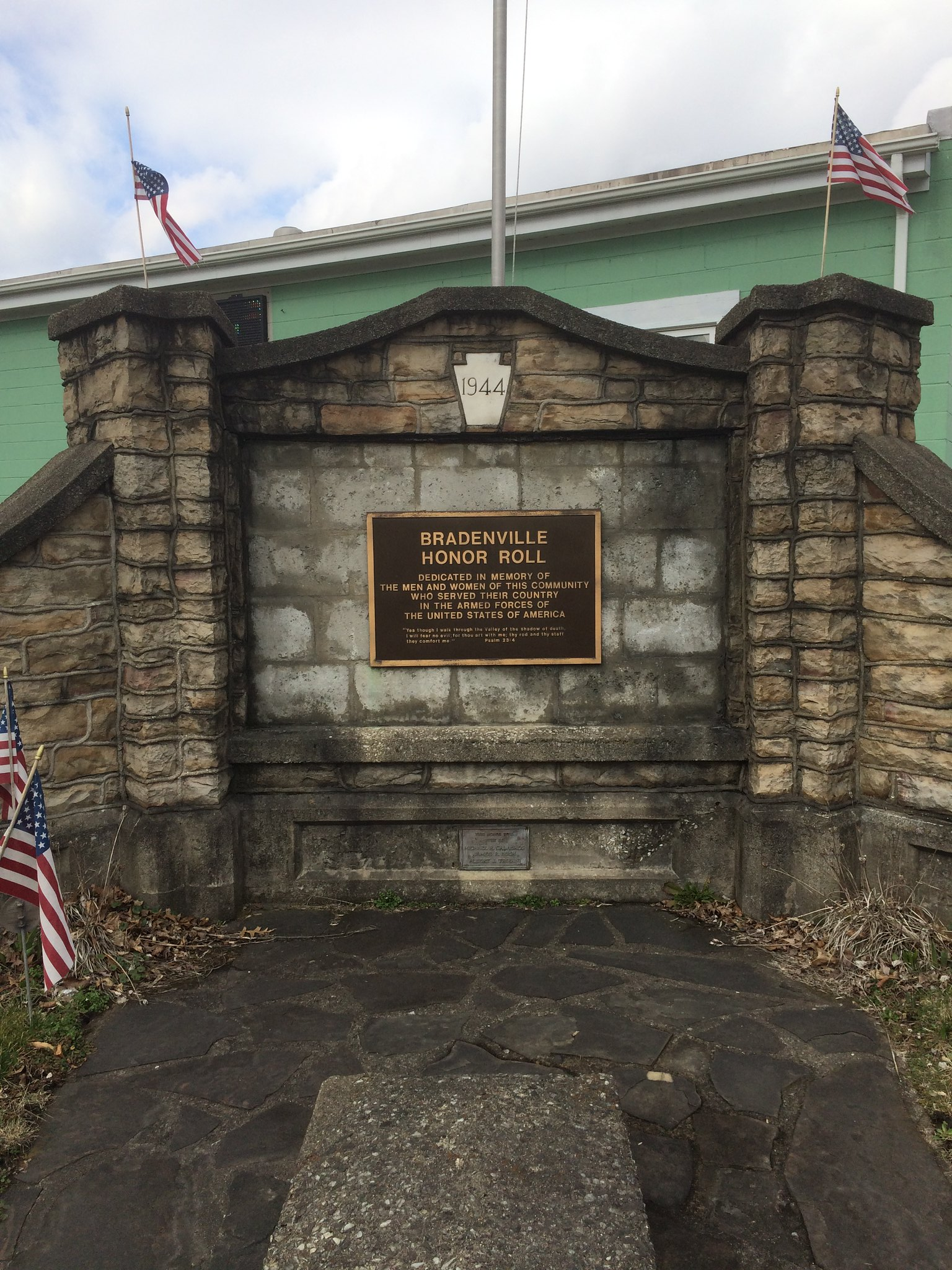
War memorial
