= Norwin High School =

Coordinates: 40.3247°N 79.7234°W

Location
- 251 McMahon Drive; North Huntingdon, Pennsylvania

Information
- Type: Public
- Established: 1958
- School district: Norwin School District
- Principal: Michael Choby
- Teaching staff: 101.15 (FTE)
- Enrollment: 1,712 (2023–2024)
- Student to teacher ratio: 16.93
- Colors: Blue and gold
- Mascot: Knight
- Website: highschool.norwinsd.org

Norwin High School is a public high school located in North Huntingdon, Pennsylvania, with a current enrollment of approximately 1,700 students in grades 9-12. It enrolls students from North Huntingdon, Irwin, and North Irwin and is part of the Norwin School District.

== History ==
In 1914, the township of North Huntingdon and boroughs of Irwin and North Irwin signed a jointure to combine their three high schools. The original merged high school (now Queen of Angels Catholic School) was built in 1916 and named Norwin Union High School. The west wing of the building was destroyed by a fire in 1944 (which severed the jointure between North Huntingdon, Irwin, and North Irwin) and the remaining structure became North Huntingdon High School. In 1950, a new west wing was constructed and the jointure between North Huntingdon, Irwin, and North Irwin was reinstated in 1958. By 1964, the building was being outgrown by its student population; as a result, Norwin’s Board of Education approved the purchase of the nearby McMahon Farm where the present-day high school was built in 1965. It underwent massive renovations, which were completed in 2006.

== Notable alumni ==
- Doug Plank (Class of 1971) — former safety for the National Football League's Chicago Bears and The Ohio State University; held various coaching positions in the National Football League and Arena Football League following his playing career
- Mark Critz (Class of 1980) — former U.S. Representative for Pennsylvania's 12th congressional district
- Paul Doucette (Class of 1990) — drummer, rhythm guitarist, and backing vocalist for Matchbox Twenty; lead vocalist of The Break and Repair Method
- Colleen Joy Shogan (Class of 1993) — former Archivist of the United States
- J. J. Matijevic (Class of 2014) — first baseman for the Mexican League's Tigres de Quintana Roo; played for Major League Baseball's Houston Astros and the University of Arizona

== Extracurriculars ==
Norwin High School offers a wide variety of extracurricular activities.

=== Sports ===
Norwin High School offers eighteen varsity-level sports: Baseball, Basketball, Bocce, Bowling, Cheerleading, Cross Country, Field Hockey, Football, Golf, Ice Hockey, Lacrosse, Soccer, Softball, Swimming, Tennis, Track & Field, Volleyball, and Wrestling.

=== Band ===
The Norwin High School Band has won 12 Pennsylvania Interscholastic Marching Band Association Championships, most recently in 2017. The Norwin High School Band also won the Bands of America Grand National Championship in 1982.
