= Mammoth, Pennsylvania =

Unincorporated community in Pennsylvania, US

- Census-designated place
- Interactive map of Mammoth, Pennsylvania
- Country: United States
- State: Pennsylvania
- County: Westmoreland

Area
  - Total: 2.02 sq mi (5.24 km^{2})
  - Land: 2.02 sq mi (5.24 km^{2})
  - Water: 0 sq mi (0.00 km^{2})

Population (2020)
  - Total: 526
  - Density: 260.2/sq mi (100.45/km^{2})
- Time zone: UTC-5 (Eastern (EST))
  - Summer (DST): UTC-4 (EDT)
- FIPS code: 42-46800

Mammoth is a census-designated place that is located in Mount Pleasant Township, Westmoreland County in the state of Pennsylvania, United States, with its own post office and postal zip code: 15664.

The community is located just off Pennsylvania Route 982 and is part of the Mount Pleasant Area School District.

== Demographics ==
As of the 2010 census, the population was 525 residents.

Historical population
Census	Pop.	Note	%±
2020	526		—
U.S. Decennial Census

== Local attractions ==
Mammoth is home to Mammoth Park, a 408-acre park that features a stocked freshwater lake, recreational areas, several playgrounds, and pavilions. The park is home to the Giant Slide Complex, a pair of 100-foot long slides perched on a climbable rock wall that replaced an older, single metal slide that locals called "the giant slide." The new complex has been embroiled in lawsuits stemming from injury claims each year since it was built, but remains open as of 2025. Every year in June, the park is host to an annual festival, Mammoth Fest, that features local craft and food vendors as well as children's rides and musical performances.

The Mount Pleasant Township Municipal Building is located in Mammoth on Poker Road.

Despite its small population, Mammoth is home to several businesses, including Citizens Telephone Company of Kecksburg (now Citizens Fiber) which first opened in 1906 to bring telephone services to the rural miners and farmers who lived in the area.

Mammoth is situated in close proximity to the site of the 1965 Kecksburg UFO incident in which many local residents claimed to have witnessed an object streak across the sky and crash-land in the woods of neighboring Kecksburg, PA. The government response to the incident has led many to speculate what the object was, leading to many theories such as a UFO or Russian satellite.

== Mining ==
Known as the infamous Mammoth Mine Disaster, on January 27, 1891, an explosion tore through Mammoth No. 1 Mine owned at the time by H.C. Frick Coke Company. Newspapers reported that firedamp was ignited by a miner's oil lamp, causing the explosion. All 110 miners who entered that day were killed instantly.

The workers killed in the mine explosion were buried in a mass grave in St. John's Cemetery in Scottdale, Pennsylvania. In 2000, the Pennsylvania Historical and Museum Commission erected a historical marker at the burial site commemorating the Mammoth Mine Explosion.

The sealed-off entrance to the mine can still be seen today. It is situated behind the Mount Pleasant Township Municipal Building, which once served as the former boiler house and lamp house for the mine. It is the only building from the mining operation still in existence. Many of the patch homes once owned by the miners and their families are still occupied today throughout Mammoth and along Poker Road.
