= Jeannette City School District =

School district in Pennsylvania

Coordinates: 40.31566°N 79.60822°W

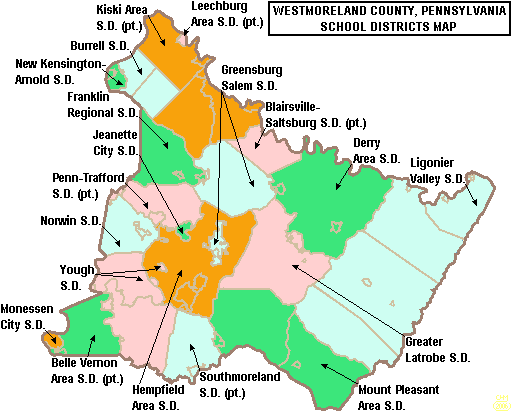
- Location of school districts in Westmoreland County

Location
- 116 Park Street, Jeannette, Pennsylvania, U.S. United States

District information
- Type: Public
- Grades: K-12
- Established: 1888

Students and staff
- District mascot: Jayhawks
- Colors: Red and Blue

Other information
- Website: www.jeannetteschooldistrict.org

The Jeannette City School District is a small urban school district in Southwestern Pennsylvania. It is located in Westmoreland County and is surrounded by the Penn-Trafford and Hempfield Area School Districts. The district consists of two schools, McKee Elementary School (PK-6) and Jeannette Junior-Senior High School that serves grades 7-12 and about 400 students.

High school sports trams conpete in the Western Pennsylvania Interscholastic Athletic League (WPIAL). In 2010 the girls basketball tr won a WPIAL championship. In 2024 the boys basketball team won a WPIAL championship.

== Schools ==
- Jeannette McKee Elementary School
- Jeannette Junior/Senior High School
  - Jayhawks are the mascot

== Alumni ==
- Steve August
- Demetrious Cox
- Dick Hoak, football player and coach
- Vaughn Monroe, musician
- Jack O'Brien (American football)
- Terrelle Pryor, football player
- William A. Shomo
