= Millwood, Pennsylvania =

Unincorporated community in Pennsylvania, US

Millwood
- Census-designated place
- Location within the state of Pennsylvania Millwood (the United States)
- Coordinates: 40°21′9″N 79°16′42″W
- Country: United States
- State: Pennsylvania
- County: Westmoreland

Area
  - Total: 0.62 sq mi (1.61 km^{2})
  - Land: 0.62 sq mi (1.61 km^{2})
  - Water: 0 sq mi (0.00 km^{2})
- Elevation: 1,188 ft (362 m)

Population (2020)
  - Total: 483
  - Density: 779.3/sq mi (300.88/km^{2})
- Time zone: UTC-5 (Eastern (EST))
  - Summer (DST): UTC-4 (EDT)
- ZIP code: 15627
- Area code: 724
- FIPS code: 42-49960
- GNIS feature ID: 1181291

Millwood is a census-designated place and coal town located in Derry Township, Westmoreland County, Pennsylvania, United States. Their post office closed in 1927. It was also known as Akers. As of the 2010 census the population was 566 residents.

== Demographics ==
Historical population
Census	Pop.	Note	%±
2020	483		—
U.S. Decennial Census
