= Sean Berton =

American football player (born 1979)

Profile
- Position: Tight end

Personal information
- Born: October 31, 1979 (age 47); Columbia, South Carolina, U.S.

Career information
- High school: Hempfield Area (Greensburg, Pennsylvania)
- College: West Virginia, North Carolina State,
- NFL draft: 2003: undrafted

Career history
- Minnesota Vikings (2003–2004); New York Giants (2005)

Awards and highlights
- First-team All-ACC (2002)
- Stats at Pro Football Reference

Sean Berton (born October 31, 1979) is an American former professional football player who was a tight end in the National Football League (NFL). He was undrafted in the 2003 NFL draft after playing college football for the NC State Wolfpack. The Minnesota Vikings signed him to a 3-year minimum rookie contract in 2003, but he was released on September 3, 2005. The New York Giants claimed him off of waivers where he finished out his rookie contract before being released on May 23, 2006.

== High school ==
Sean started his football career at Hempfield Area High School in Greensburg, Pennsylvania. He started as a sophomore at tight end and inside linebacker. He quickly became a fierce competitor in the Western Pennsylvania Interscholastic Athletic League and was revered as one of the best tight ends/inside linebackers in the western Pennsylvanian area. He began getting recruited his junior year by schools such as the University of Pittsburgh, South Carolina, West Virginia, Maryland, Boston College, and Rutgers. Sean won the Pittsburgh Post-Gazette's tight end position in their Fabulous 22 team. He conducted numerous college visits, but because of its atmosphere and facilities, he finally decided on West Virginia University.

== College ==
Sean was red-shirted his freshmen year at West Virginia University where he gained weight to become a better blocker for the mountaineers. Teammates such as Anthony Becht, Mark Bulger, and Brad Lewis had high hopes for Berton's performance in the years to come. He began playing his sophomore year as the team's starting tight end. At the end of his sophomore year, his head coach of the time Don Nehlen retired, bringing in a new coach Rich Rodriguez. Since Rich Rodriguez's offense would not utilize tight ends that often, Berton opted to transfer to a different school.

North Carolina State University was the first choice Sean had in mind. He met with coach Curt Cignetti, the tight end coach of North Carolina University, and that seemed to decide it for Berton. When he transferred he realized he had to sit out for one year, which left him with one year of eligibility. Berton played with such players as Philip Rivers and Jerricho Cotchery. After his senior season Berton received the Atlantic Coast Conference All-ACC Tight End position award. Sean was expected to be a late round draft pick, but was later picked up as a free agent to join the National Football League.

== National Football League ==
=== Minnesota Vikings ===
Sean Berton was picked up by the Minnesota Vikings as an un-drafted free agent on April 23, 2003. While playing with the Vikings he was used primarily as a blocker in the fullback/tight end position. Sean played with NFL stars such as Daunte Culpepper, Randy Moss and Mewelde Moore. Sean played for the Vikings for two years before he got waived off the team, and picked up by the New York Giants.

=== New York Giants ===
Sean was picked up as a free agent on September 5, 2005, by the New York Giants. He was again used as a full back/tight end for blocking. Sean helped the team with his excellent blocking allowing young quarterback Eli Manning time to throw to receivers such as Plaxico Burress. Sean's main accomplishment was to allow his running back Tiki Barber to gain time and space to run the ball. In December 2005 Sean tore a ligament in his right knee and was placed on injured reserve. By May 23, 2006, Sean was waived off the team.

== Lawsuit against the NFL ==
In December 2011, Berton made headlines when he and a group of 11 other former professional players filed a lawsuit against the NFL. Berton and his attorneys allege that the league failed to properly treat head injuries in spite of prevailing medical evidence, leading the players to develop effects of brain injury ranging from chronic headaches to depression.
