= Hostetter, Pennsylvania =

Unincorporated community in Pennsylvania, US

Coordinates: 40°15′58″N 79°23′54″W

- Census-designated place
- Interactive map of Hostetter, Pennsylvania
- Country: United States
- State: Pennsylvania
- County: Westmoreland

Area
  - Total: 0.73 sq mi (1.88 km^{2})
  - Land: 0.73 sq mi (1.88 km^{2})
  - Water: 0 sq mi (0.00 km^{2})

Population (2020)
  - Total: 732
  - Density: 1,006/sq mi (388.6/km^{2})
- Time zone: UTC-5 (Eastern (EST))
  - Summer (DST): UTC-4 (EDT)
- FIPS code: 42-35872

Hostetter is a census-designated place located in Unity Township, Westmoreland County in the state of Pennsylvania, United States. It is located near Pennsylvania Route 981. As of the 2010 census the population was 740 residents.

== Demographics ==
Historical population
Census	Pop.	Note	%±
2020	732		—
U.S. Decennial Census
