= Hempfield Area School District =

School district in Pennsylvania

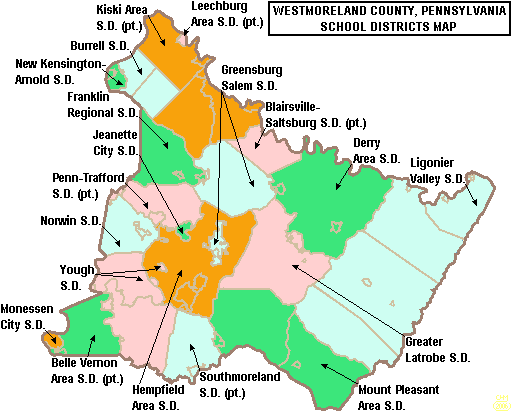

Location
- Hempfield Township, Westmoreland County, Pennsylvania United States

District information
- Type: Public
- Grades: K-12
- Established: 1954
- Superintendent: Mark Holtzman

Students and staff
- Students: 6348 in 2009–10
- Staff: Approx. 440
- Athletic conference: WPIAL 6A
- District mascot: Spartan
- Colors: Royal Blue and Silver

Other information
- Website: District Website

Hempfield Area School District is a large school district in western Pennsylvania. It is the largest in Westmoreland County with a resident population of over 50,000 and covers approximately 95 square miles (250 km^{2}) and lies 25 miles (40 km) southeast of Pittsburgh. The school district was formed in a merger of The School District of Hempfield Township, Adamsburg School District, Hunker School District, Manor School District and Youngwood School District on July 3, 1961. The school district population comes from Hempfield Township and the boroughs of Adamsburg, Hunker, Manor, New Stanton, and Youngwood. It completely surrounds the city of Greensburg. The community is a mix of Pittsburgh suburbia and rural areas.
The school system includes five elementary buildings, three middle schools, a high school, an alternative education school and an after-school alternative education program. The Central Westmoreland Career and Technology Center serves Hempfield students in the high school. Hempfield Area School District is made up of approximately 6,600 students in grades K-12, is served by a professional staff of 445, and an administrative staff of 20.

== Elementary schools ==
Fort Allen Elementary School was opened in 1952 and completely renovated in 2000–2001. It is located in central Hempfield Township, Pennsylvania. Upgraded school facilities include an enlarged library with internet access and computerized library catalogue, a 32-station computer lab, full size gym with a stage, well equipped art and music rooms, remolded cafeteria, a nurse's suite, conference room, and modern office space as well as 28 full size classrooms and a number of smaller rooms for specialized instruction. The building has complete climate control. Outside is a large playground.

Maxwell Elementary School is nestled on 10 acres (40,000 m^{2}) in Greensburg, Pennsylvania. It was opened in 1952 and was renovated in 2000. Maxwell serves approximately 455 students in kindergarten through fifth grade.

Stanwood Elementary School is located eight miles (13 km) southwest of Greensburg, Pennsylvania and five miles (8.0 km) due south of Hempfield High School in New Stanton Borough. The school was originally opened in 1970 as a junior high school. Due to declining enrollment, Hempfield did not have a need for four junior high schools. In 1984, New Stanton Elementary and Youngwood Elementary were closed and Stanwood was turned into an elementary school. Stanwood serves approximately 628 students in grades Kindergarten through fifth. The school's cadre of teachers and support staff numbers approximately 60. The school was completely renovated in 2009–2010.

West Hempfield Elementary School is located in Irwin, Pennsylvania. West Hempfield Elementary School was opened in 1962 and completely renovated in 2002–2003. This school serves approximately 615 students in grades Kindergarten through fifth.

West Point Elementary School is located off of Route 130 in eastern Hempfield Township, Pennsylvania. West Point Elementary School, which was opened in 1964 and renovated in 2001. West Point serves approximately 250 students from eastern Hempfield Township in grades Kindergarten through fifth. Starting in the 2007–08 school year, students that attended East Hempfield Elementary will now attend here.

== Middle schools ==
Harrold Middle School is located directly across from the Hempfield Area High School in the central part of Hempfield Township, Pennsylvania. It is the largest of the three Hempfield Area Middle Schools. It is also the oldest school in the district. It was opened in 1929 and has been renovated extensively in 1985 and in 2000. As of the 2023–2024 school year it is used to house the 9th graders as the Hempfield Area High School gets renovated.

Wendover Middle School is located in the eastern part of Hempfield Township, Pennsylvania. The school was opened in 1970 and was extensively renovated in 2012. Students participate in a variety of district, regional, state, and national academic and athletic competitions. The students win numerous awards and championships annually.

West Hempfield Middle School is located in Irwin, Pennsylvania. It was opened in 1964 and was completely renovated and updated for the start of the 2003–2004 school year. Students participate in a variety of district, regional, state, and national academic and athletic competitions. The students win numerous awards and championships annually. West Hempfield Middle serves students in the western and now southern part of Hempfield Township.

== High school ==
- Hempfield Area High School

=== Vocational technical services ===
HAHS uses the services of Central Westmoreland Career and Technology Center in New Stanton for the students there who wish to choose a vocational or technical program.

== Former schools ==
East Hempfield Elementary School (1958–2007) was a primary school located in eastern Hempfield Township, Pennsylvania. Originally, East Hempfield served approximately 200 students in grades 1–6. Later, it served students in K-2. After students finished second grade, they would attend West Point Elementary School. The school was built in 1958.

- Bovard Elementary School (1)
- Bovard Elementary School (2) (1975–2013), located in the northeastern section of Hempfield Township, Pennsylvania, serves approximately 240 students in grades Kindergarten through fifth; the school was opened in 1975, making it the last school built in the district.
- St. Clair Elementary School (1)
- St. Clair Elementary School (2) (1954–1990)
- Youngwood Elementary School (-1983)
- Youngwood Junior High School
- New Stanton Elementary School (-1983)
- Thomas Elementary School (-1983)
- Manor Elementary School (1901–1990)
- Manor Junior High School
- Lincoln Heights Elementary School (-1982)
- Luxor Elementary School
- Mt. Odin Elementary School
- Todd Elementary School
- Diamond Elementary School
- Pleasant Valley Elementary School
- Brush Creek Elementary School
- Grapeville Elementary School
- Washington Elementary School
- Hannastown Elementary School
- Liberty Elementary School
- Kemerer Elementary School
- Weavers Old Stand Elementary School
- Kennedy Elementary School
- Armburst Elementary School
- Hillview Elementary School
- Blank Elementary School
- High Park Elementary School
- Oak Grove Elementary School
- Swede Hill Elementary School
- Stanton Elementary School
- Wendel Elementary School
- Paintersville Elementary School
- Hunker Elementary School
- Harrold #8 (1881–1928), restored and now used by the district as an educational tool

== Former superintendents ==
- Kimberlie Rieffannacht (2023-2024) (Acting)
- Tammy Wolicki (2017-2024)
- Barbara Marin (2014–2017)
- Andy Leopold (2011–2014)
- Terry Foriska (2007–2011)
- Wayne Doyle (2000–2007)
- Erv Weischedel (1999–2000)
- Barbara Ferrier (1998–1999) (Acting)
- Cheryl Troglio (1997–1998) (Acting)
- C. Richard Nichols (1991–1997)
- Silvio Mincucci (1991) (Acting)
- Margaret Smith (1986–1991)
- William Roscher (1986) (Acting)
- Elliott LeFaiver (1983–1986)
- Guido Ciccarelli (1983) (Acting)
- Kenneth Ruoff (1969–1982)
- Theo Fullerton (1952–1969)

== Extracurriculars ==
The district offers a variety of clubs, activities and sports.

=== Athletics ===
- Hempfield Area Spartans Baseball
- Hempfield Area Spartans Basketball – 6–16
- Hempfield Area Spartans Bowling
- Hempfield Area Spartans Cross Country
- Hempfield Area Spartans Field Hockey
- Hempfield Area Spartans Football – 1–8
- Hempfield Area Spartans Golf
- Hempfield Area Spartans Rifle
- Hempfield Area Spartans Soccer
- Hempfield Area Spartans Softball
- Hempfield Area Spartans Swimming
- Hempfield Area Spartans Tennis –
  - Section champions 2003, 2004, 2005, 2010, 2011;
- Hempfield Area Spartans Track and Field
- Hempfield Area Spartans Volleyball – Logan Karanovich (captain)
- Hempfield Area Spartans Wrestling
- Hempfield Area Spartans Competitive Majorettes and Color Guard
- Hempfield Area Spartans Competitive Cheer

== Notable alumni ==
Michael Williams - MIT Physicist Class of 1998

Rick Druschel - 1974 Super Bowl Winner, Pittsburgh Steelers] Class of 1970

Sheila Kelley - American Actress Class of 1979

Michael A. McVay - American Broadcaster Class of 1971

Commander George Dom - Navy Pilot, Commander of U.S. Navy Blue Angels Class of 1973
