= Isabella Furnace (Carnegie Steel) =

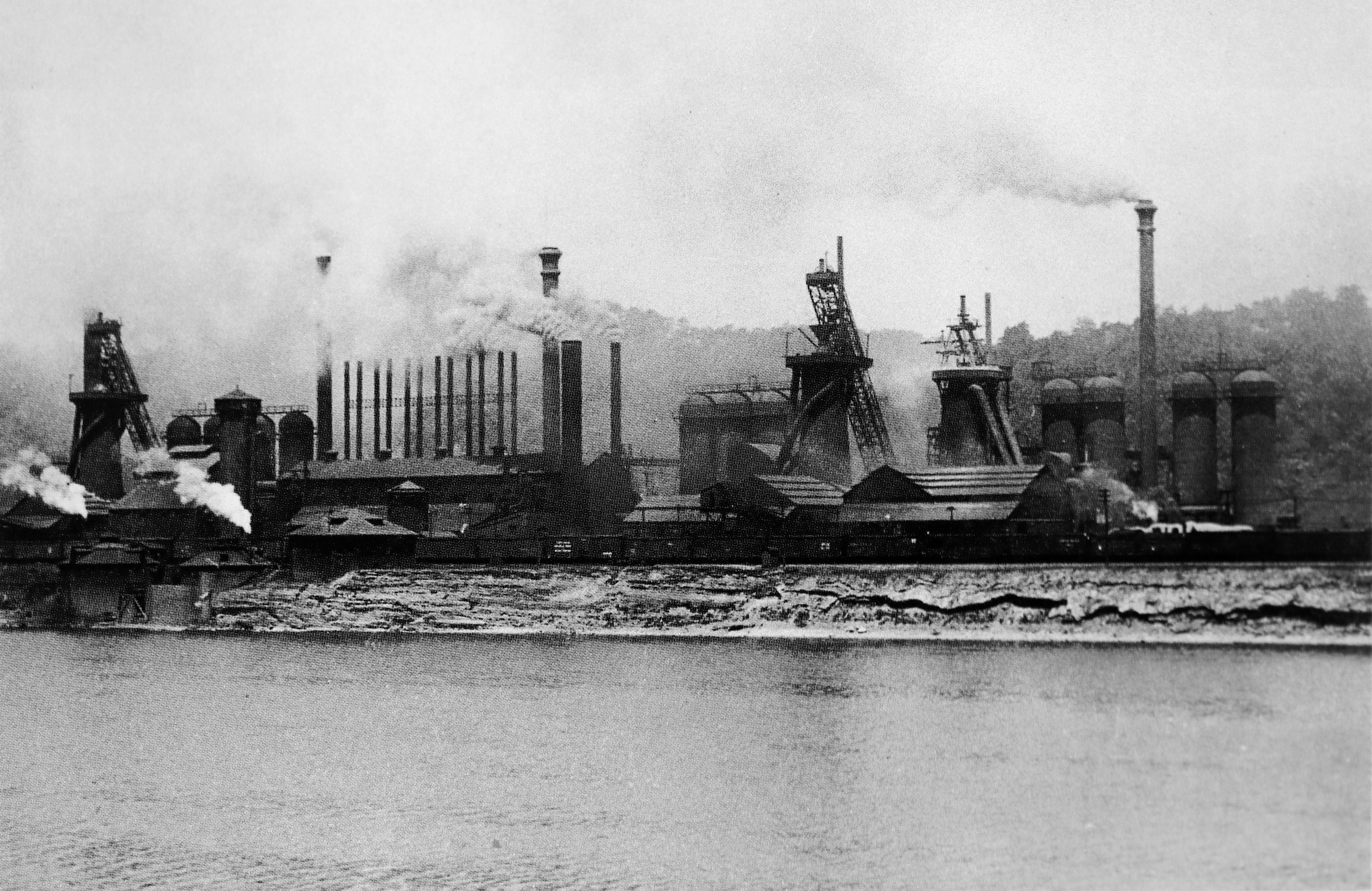
- The Isabella Furnaces in 1905.
- Built: 1872
- Location: Etna, Pennsylvania
- Coordinates: 40.4916°N 79.9441°W
- Industry: Steelmaking
- Style: Blast furnace
- Owner(s): Isabella Furnace Co., Carnegie Steel, U.S. Steel
- Defunct: August 1953

Isabella Furnace was a collection of blast furnaces built in 1872 in Etna, Pennsylvania, across the Allegheny River from Pittsburgh.

The furnaces were built by Pittsburgh-area manufacturers (Lewis Dalzell & Co; J. Painter & Sons; Graff, Bennet & Co; Spang, Chalfant & Co; Henry Oliver of Oliver Brothers & Phillips; William Smith) who were dependent on pig iron. They incorporated as the Isabella Furnace Company and built two furnaces, later adding a third. The first two furnaces were 75 feet high, one with a capacity of 12,800 cubic feet and the other 14,000 cubic feet. They were built following the designs of modern English furnaces, among the first in the United States and among the largest at the time.

Isabella Furnace Co. also built in Spring 1872 its 200-oven, 600-acre coke works for the furnace in Coketown (now Cokeville) near the terminus of the W.P.R.R., 60 miles to the East.

Isabella Furnace was named after two women: Isabella Herron, the sister of one of the members of owners Spang, Chalfant & Co. and Isabella Crowther, daughter of the furnace's lead engineer, Cyril W. Crowther.

At the same time, The Carnegie Steel Company was building its Lucy Furnace one mile down the Allegheny, and both the Lucy and Isabella went into blast around the same time in the summer of 1872. The Lucy and Isabella maintained a fierce rivalry, racing to outproduce each other. The rivalry lasted until Lucy was dismantled in 1937.

In 1901, Carnegie Steel Company acquired the Isabella. The next year, much of the plant was replaced with more modern equipment.

James Gayley developed the dry-air blast technique at Isabella Furnace and the Edgar Thomson Steel Works between 1885 and 1904. The discovery reduced the cost of a ton of pig iron by $0.50 to $1.00 and made it possible to produce uniform quality metal regardless of weather. It was first put into operation at the plant on August 11, 1904. In the week prior to its introduction, Isabella averaged 358 tons of pig iron daily, consuming 2,147 pounds of coke; in the following week it averaged 447 tons with a coke usage of 1,726 pounds.

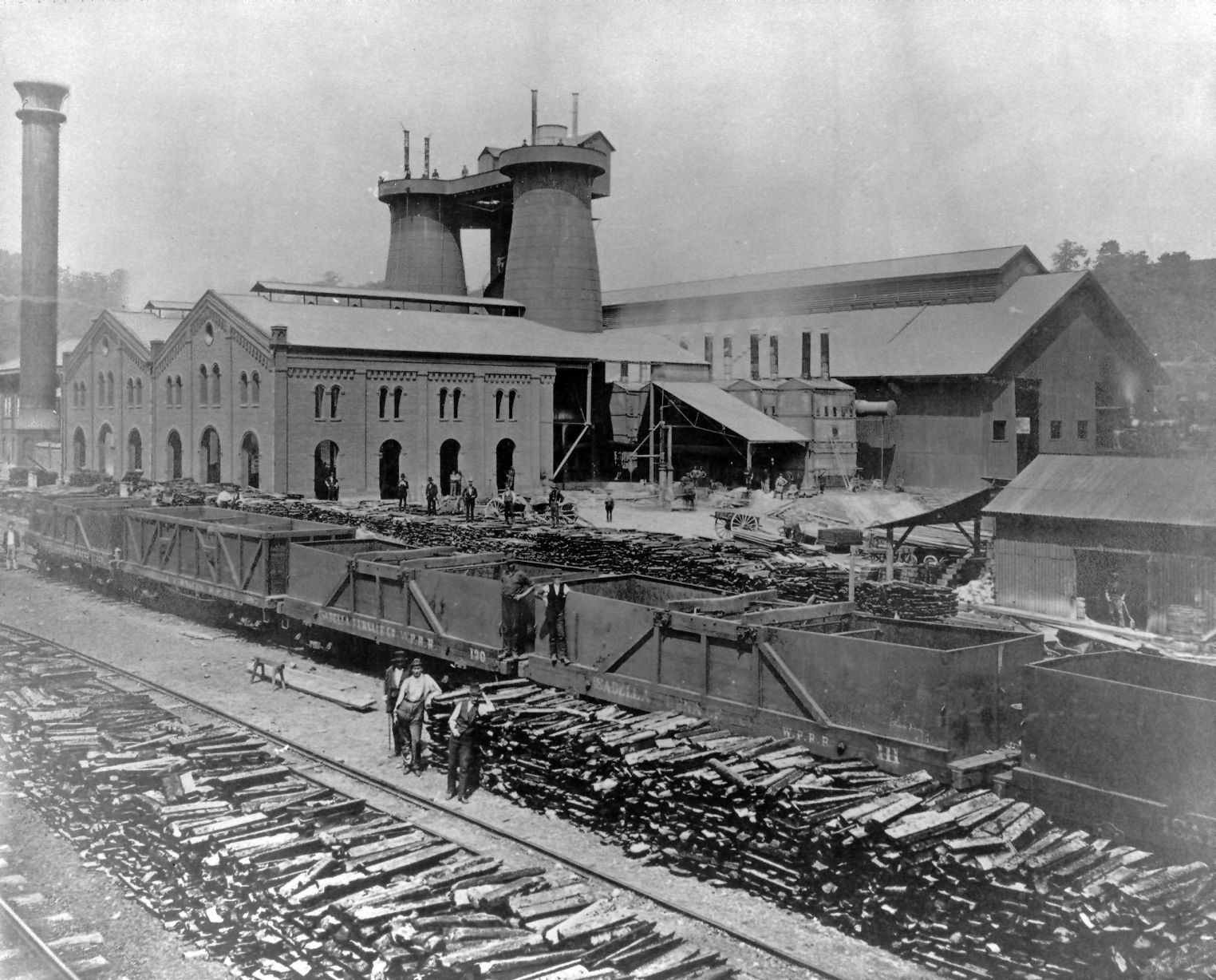
The furnaces in 1880, showing rail cars connecting to the W.P.R.R.

By 1948, the plant was no longer producing any iron; its furnaces repurposed exclusively to produce ferromanganese, an important deoxidizing alloy in steelmaking. Using 10 million gallons of water a day, the furnaces produced about 210 tons of ferromanganese.

Isabella ceased operation in August 1953. It was scheduled to be shut down at least a decade earlier, but World War II and the Korean War produced unexpected demand for steel.
