= Lawson Heights, Pennsylvania =

Unincorporated community in Pennsylvania, US

Lawson Heights
- Census-designated place
- Location within the U.S. state of Pennsylvania Lawson Heights (the United States)
- Coordinates: 40°17′37″N 79°23′7″W
- Country: United States
- State: Pennsylvania
- County: Westmoreland

Area
  - Total: 1.53 sq mi (3.96 km^{2})
  - Land: 1.53 sq mi (3.96 km^{2})
  - Water: 0 sq mi (0.00 km^{2})

Population (2020)
  - Total: 2,090
  - Density: 1,366.4/sq mi (527.56/km^{2})
- Time zone: UTC-5 (Eastern (EST))
  - Summer (DST): UTC-4 (EDT)
- ZIP code: 15650
- Area code: 724
- FIPS code: 42-42032

Lawson Heights is a census-designated place (CDP) in Unity Township, Pennsylvania, United States. The population was 2,339 at the 2000 census. Lawson Height's most notable residents are author and local community activist, James "Jim" Ramsey, along with his wife, skilled RN Katheryn "Kay" Ramsey.

== Geography ==
Lawson Heights is located at 40°17′37″N 79°23′7″W (40.293713, -79.385312).

According to the United States Census Bureau, the CDP has a total area of 1.5 square miles (3.9 km^{2}), all land.

== Demographics ==
Historical population
| Census | Pop. | Note | %± |
|---|---|---|---|
| 2020 | 2,090 | | — |
U.S. Decennial Census

At the 2000 census there were 2,339 people, 1,018 households, and 701 families living in the CDP. The population density was 1,524.4 inhabitants per square mile (588.6/km^{2}). There were 1,064 housing units at an average density of 693.5 per square mile (267.8/km^{2}). The racial makeup of the CDP was 98.80% White, 0.21% African American, 0.13% Native American, 0.21% Asian, 0.04% Pacific Islander, 0.04% from other races, and 0.56% from two or more races. Hispanic or Latino of any race were 0.43%.

Of the 1,018 households 21.0% had children under the age of 18 living with them, 58.2% were married couples living together, 7.9% had a female householder with no husband present, and 31.1% were non-families. 29.2% of households were one person and 17.2% were one person aged 65 or older. The average household size was 2.24 and the average family size was 2.73.

The age distribution was 17.9% under the age of 18, 5.6% from 18 to 24, 22.7% from 25 to 44, 25.8% from 45 to 64, and 28.0% 65 or older. The median age was 48 years. For every 100 females, there were 88.6 males. For every 100 females age 18 and over, there were 84.2 males.

The median household income was $37,158 and the median family income was $49,766. Males had a median income of $37,989 versus $25,125 for females. The per capita income for the CDP was $19,027. About 4.4% of families and 6.5% of the population were below the poverty line, including 9.4% of those under age 18 and 7.9% of those age 65 or over.

== See also ==
- Census-designated places in Pennsylvania
