= Fellsburg, Pennsylvania =

Unincorporated community in Pennsylvania, US

Coordinates: 40°10′59″N 79°49′27″W

- Census-designated place
- Interactive map of Fellsburg, Pennsylvania
- Country: United States
- State: Pennsylvania
- County: Westmoreland

Area
  - Total: 1.24 sq mi (3.21 km^{2})
  - Land: 1.24 sq mi (3.21 km^{2})
  - Water: 0 sq mi (0.00 km^{2})

Population (2020)
  - Total: 1,153
  - Density: 931.5/sq mi (359.67/km^{2})
- Time zone: UTC-5 (Eastern (EST))
  - Summer (DST): UTC-4 (EDT)
- ZIP code: 15012
- Area code: 724
- FIPS code: 42-25568

Fellsburg is a census-designated place located in Rostraver Township, Westmoreland County in the state of Pennsylvania, United States. It is home to the Fells Church, overlooking the Monongahela and Youhgiogheny Valleys. As of the 2010 census the population was 1,180 residents.

== Demographics ==
Historical population
Census	Pop.	Note	%±
2010	1,180		—
2020	1,153		−2.3%
U.S. Decennial Census

Fellsburg CDP, Pennsylvania – Racial composition Note: the US Census treats Hispanic/Latino as an ethnic category. This table excludes Latinos from the racial categories and assigns them to a separate category. Hispanics/Latinos may be of any race.
Race (NH = Non-Hispanic)	% 2020	% 2010	Pop 2020	Pop 2010
White alone (NH)	93.9%	96.6%	1,083	1,140
Black alone (NH)	0.7%	0.7%	8	8
American Indian alone (NH)	0%	0%	0	0
Asian alone (NH)	1.4%	0.3%	16	3
Pacific Islander alone (NH)	0%	0%	0	0
Other race alone (NH)	0%	0%	0	0
Multiracial (NH)	2.6%	0.8%	30	9
Hispanic/Latino (any race)	1.4%	1.7%	16	20

The most reported ancestries in 2020 were:

- Italian (24.5%)
- German (21.9%)
- Irish (19.8%)
- English (18.2%)
- Polish (10.4%)
- Slovak (6.2%)
- Scottish (5.3%)
- Russian (3.2%)
- Hungarian (2.4%)
- Ukrainian (2.3%)
