= Penn, Pennsylvania =

Borough in Pennsylvania, US

- Borough
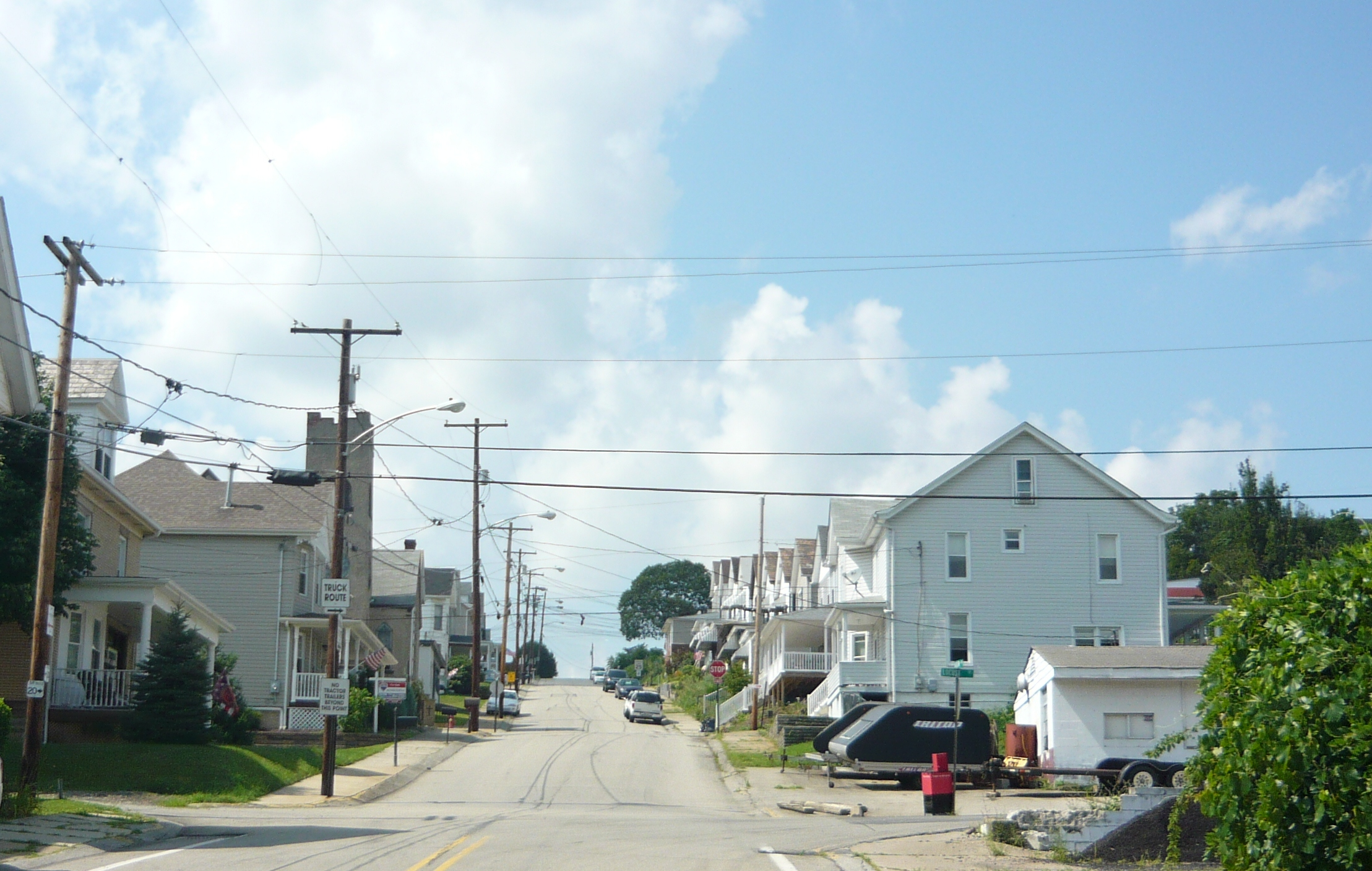
- Locust Street

- Location of Penn in Westmoreland County, Pennsylvania.

- Location within Pennsylvania
- Coordinates: 40°19′44″N 79°38′25″W
- Country: United States
- State: Pennsylvania
- County: Westmoreland
- Settled: 1859
- Incorporated: 1865

Government
  - Type: Borough Council

Area
  - Total: 0.16 sq mi (0.41 km^{2})
  - Land: 0.16 sq mi (0.41 km^{2})
  - Water: 0 sq mi (0.00 km^{2})
- Elevation: 984 ft (300 m)

Population (2020)
  - Total: 435
  - Density: 2,775.4/sq mi (1,071.57/km^{2})
- Time zone: UTC-5 (Eastern (EST))
  - Summer (DST): UTC-4 (EDT)
- Zip code: 15675
- FIPS code: 42-58872

Penn is a borough in Westmoreland County, Pennsylvania, United States. As of the 2020 census, Penn had a population of 435.

The borough was named for Pennsylvania founder William Penn.

== Geography ==
Penn is located at 40°19′44″N 79°38′25″W (40.329018, -79.640141).

According to the United States Census Bureau, the borough has a total area of 0.2 square miles (0.52 km^{2}), all of it land.

== Demographics ==
Historical population
Census	Pop.	Note	%±
1870	820		—
1880	604		−26.3%
1890	931		54.1%
1900	763		−18.0%
1910	1,048		37.4%
1920	1,019		−2.8%
1930	926		−9.1%
1940	1,081		16.7%
1950	987		−8.7%
1960	858		−13.1%
1970	735		−14.3%
1980	619		−15.8%
1990	511		−17.4%
2000	460		−10.0%
2010	475		3.3%
2020	435		−8.4%

At the time of the 2000 census there were 460 people, 182 households, and 133 families living in the borough.

The population density was 2,974.7 inhabitants per square mile (1,148.5/km^{2}). There were 187 housing units at an average density of 1,209.3 units per square mile (466.9 units/km^{2}).

The racial makeup of the borough was 96.52% White, 1.52% African American, 1.09% from other races, and 0.87% from two or more races.

Of the 182 households 37.4% had children under the age of 18 living with them, 51.1% were married couples living together, 18.7% had a female householder with no husband present, and 26.4% were non-families. 25.8% of households were one person and 12.6% were one person aged 65 or older.

The average household size was 2.52 and the average family size was 2.99.

The age distribution was 27.6% under the age of 18, 6.1% from 18 to 24, 32.2% from 25 to 44, 18.0% from 45 to 64, and 16.1% 65 or older. The median age was 35 years.

For every 100 females, there were 81.8 males. For every 100 females age 18 and over, there were 77.1 males.

The median household income was $35,962 and the median family income was $40,481. Males had a median income of $32,031 compared with that of $22,875 for females.

The per capita income for the borough was $14,312.

Roughly 4.4% of families and 7.4% of the population were below the poverty line, including 9.1% of those under age 18 and 7.0% of those age 65 or over.
