= North Irwin, Pennsylvania =

Borough in Pennsylvania, US

- Borough
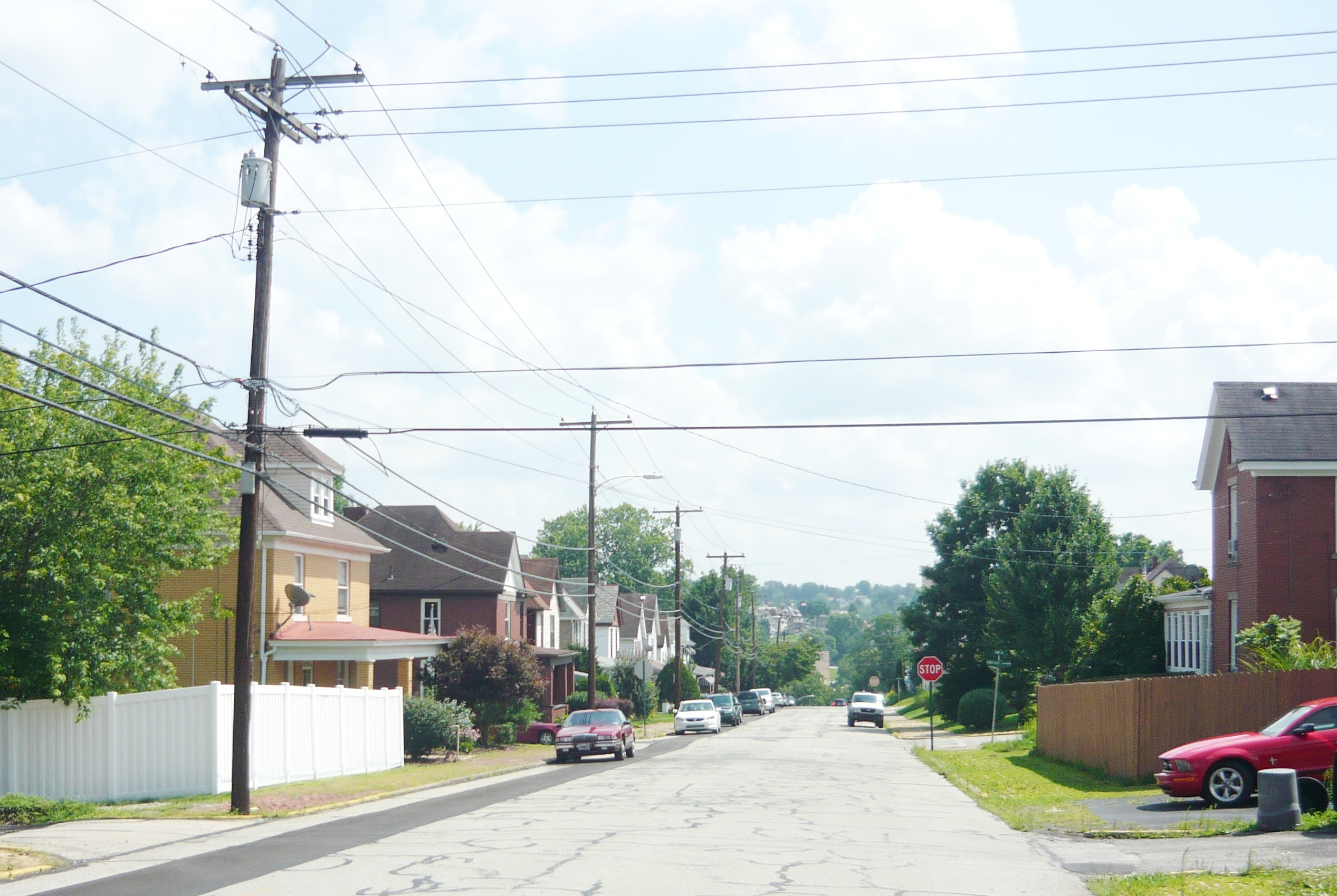
- First Street

- Location of North Irwin in Westmoreland County, Pennsylvania.

- Location within Pennsylvania
- Coordinates: 40°20′17″N 79°42′39″W
- Country: United States
- State: Pennsylvania
- County: Westmoreland
- Incorporated: December 29, 1894

Government
  - Type: Borough Council

Area
  - Total: 0.20 sq mi (0.52 km^{2})
  - Land: 0.20 sq mi (0.52 km^{2})
  - Water: 0 sq mi (0.00 km^{2})
- Elevation: 1,010 ft (310 m)

Population (2020)
  - Total: 823
  - Density: 4,069.5/sq mi (1,571.23/km^{2})
- Time zone: UTC-5 (Eastern (EST))
  - Summer (DST): UTC-4 (EDT)
- Zip code: 15642
- FIPS code: 42-55136
- Website: https://www.northirwinborough.com/

North Irwin is a borough in Westmoreland County, Pennsylvania, United States. As of the 2020 census, North Irwin had a population of 823.

== Geography ==
North Irwin is located at 40°20′17″N 79°42′39″W (40.338119, -79.710966).

According to the United States Census Bureau, the borough has a total area of 0.2 square miles (0.52 km^{2}), all of it land.

== Demographics ==
Historical population
Census	Pop.	Note	%±
1900	403		—
1910	646		60.3%
1920	908		40.6%
1930	1,064		17.2%
1940	1,153		8.4%
1950	1,076		−6.7%
1960	1,143		6.2%
1970	1,306		14.3%
1980	1,016		−22.2%
1990	956		−5.9%
2000	879		−8.1%
2010	846		−3.8%
2020	823		−2.7%

As of the census of 2000, there were 879 people, 381 households, and 243 families living in the borough.

The population density was 4,307.2 inhabitants per square mile (1,663.0/km^{2}). There were 393 housing units at an average density of 1,925.8 units per square mile (743.6 units/km^{2}).

The racial makeup of the borough was 98.29% White, 0.11% African American, 0.46% Native American, and 1.14% from two or more races. Hispanic or Latino of any race were 0.23% of the population.

There were 381 households, out of which 28.6% had children under the age of eighteen living with them; 50.9% were married couples living together, 9.7% had a female householder with no husband present, and 36.2% were non-families. 33.3% of all households were made up of individuals, and 13.9% had someone living alone who was 65 years of age or older.

The average household size was 2.31 and the average family size was 2.96.

In the borough, the population was spread out, with 22.5% under the age of eighteen, 8.1% from eighteen to twenty-four, 30.8% from twenty-five to forty-four, 22.5% from forty-five to sixty-four, and 16.0% who were sixty-five years of age or older. The median age was thirty-nine years.

For every one hundred females, there were 94.0 males. For every one hundred females aged eighteen and over, there were 95.1 males.

The median income for a household in the borough was $33,750, and the median income for a family was $40,217. Males had a median income of $29,318 versus $19,881 for females.

The per capita income for the borough was $15,665.

Roughly 4.8% of families and 5.8% of the population were living below the poverty line, including 6.0% of those who were under the age of eighteen and 9.4% of those aged sixty-five or over.
