= Pennsylvania Route 130 =

State highway in Pennsylvania, US

Pennsylvania Route 130

Route information
- Maintained by PennDOT
- Length: 49.273 mi (79.297 km)

Major junctions
- West end: PA 8 in Pittsburgh
- PA 380 in Penn Hills: I-376 / US 22 in Churchill; PA 48 in Pitcairn; PA 993 in Penn Township; PA Turnpike 66 near Jeannette; US 119 / PA 819 in Greensburg; US 30 in Greensburg; PA 981 in Pleasant Unity; PA 982 near Pleasant Unity; PA 711 in Stahlstown
- East end: PA 381 near Kregar

Location
- Country: United States
- State: Pennsylvania
- Counties: Allegheny, Westmoreland

Highway system
- Pennsylvania State Route System; Interstate; US; State; Scenic; Legislative
← PA 129	→ PA 131
← I-180	PA 180	→ PA 181
← PA 185	PA 186	→ PA 187

Pennsylvania Route 130 (PA 130) is a 49-mile-long (79 km) state highway located in Allegheny and Westmoreland counties in Pennsylvania. The western terminus is at PA 8 in Pittsburgh, and the eastern terminus is at PA 381 near Kregar.

The highway begins at a busy intersection in Pittsburgh's Highland Park neighborhood. For the next 2.7 miles (4.3 km), it follows a portion of the Green Belt, running along a peaceful parkway in the urban environment of Pittsburgh and Penn Hills. It then serves as a major two-lane road through the suburbs of Penn Hills, Churchill, and Wilkins Township. It then connects with the old industrial suburbs of Turtle Creek, Wilmerding, Pitcairn, and Trafford. The road continues through suburban Penn Township, before passing through the industrial city of Jeannette, and entering Greensburg, one of several edge county seats which serve as Pittsburgh edge cities.

After journeying through heavily suburbanized Hempfield Township, the road enters a very rural area at the foothills of the Appalachian Mountains.

== Route description ==
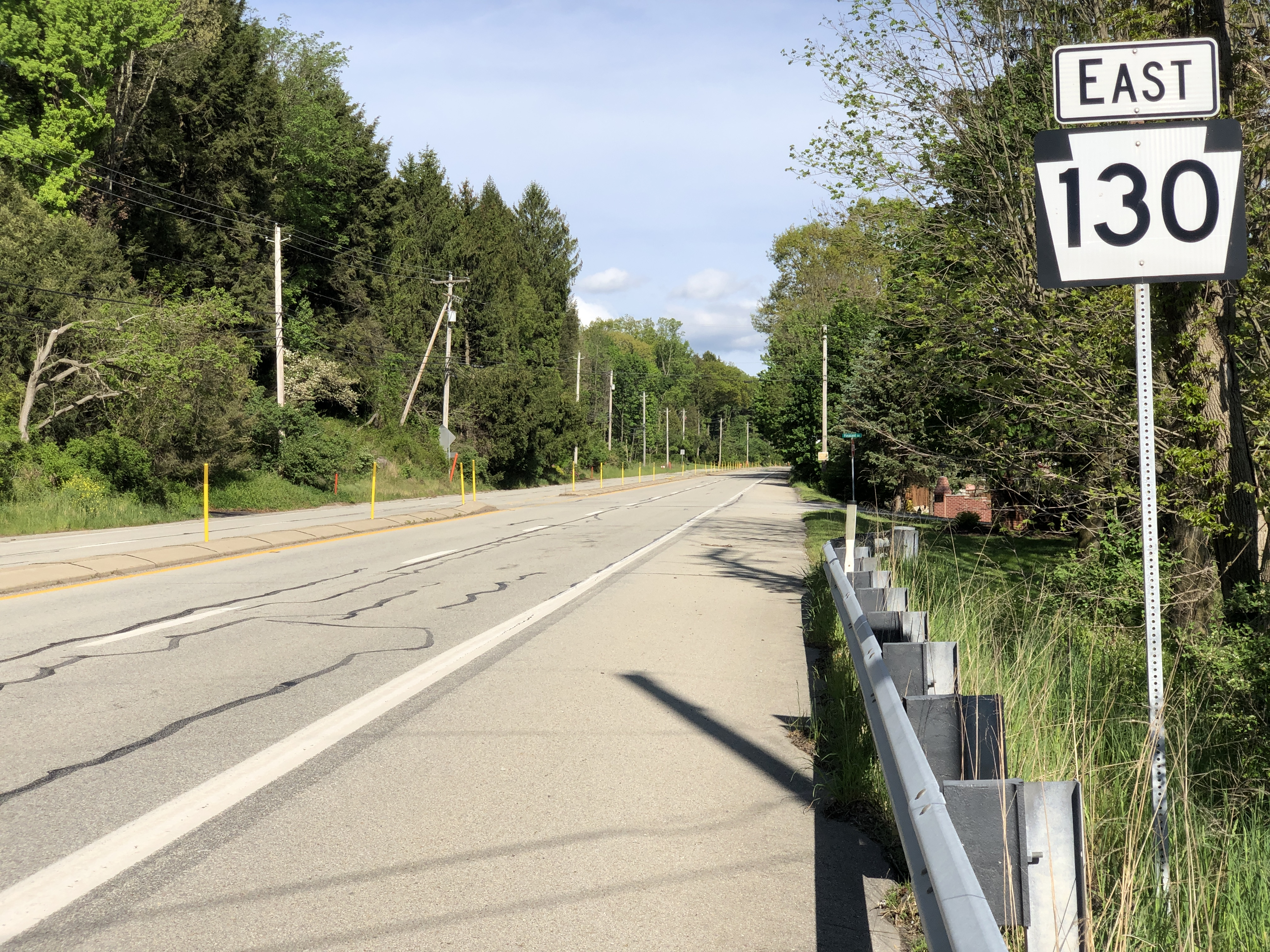
PA 130 eastbound in Hempfield Township

=== Allegheny County ===
PA 130 begins at an intersection with PA 8 (which is a part of the Blue Belt of the Allegheny County belt system) in the Highland Park neighborhood of the city of Pittsburgh in Allegheny County, heading east on two-lane undivided Allegheny River Boulevard, which is a part of the Green Belt. The road passes under the Brilliant Branch railway line and a connector track as it heads through woodland with the Allegheny Subdivision line and the Allegheny River to the north of the road. The route crosses into Penn Hills and continues alongside the railroad and the river, turning southeast onto Sandy Creek Road away from the Allegheny River. PA 130 heads through wooded areas of commercial development and turning south. The route comes to an intersection with Verona Road in Sandy Creek, at which point the Green Belt turns west. The road becomes Coal Hollow Road and passes through woodland near residential subdivisions, curving southeast before heading south onto Old Coal Hollow Road and reaching an intersection with PA 380 in a commercial area. PA 130 becomes Beulah Road and runs through suburban residential neighborhoods, turning southwest as it crosses into the borough of Churchill. The route heads through wooded areas with some nearby homes, curving southeast and south before reaching an interchange with Interstate 376/US Route 22 (I-376/US 22), at which point it is a four-lane divided highway. Past this, the road becomes a four-lane undivided road and continues past homes, narrowing back to two lanes. PA 130 enters Wilkins Township and heads through commercial areas with some homes, becoming Brown Avenue and heading south. The road continues through wooded areas with some development, heading into the borough of Turtle Creek and passing homes.

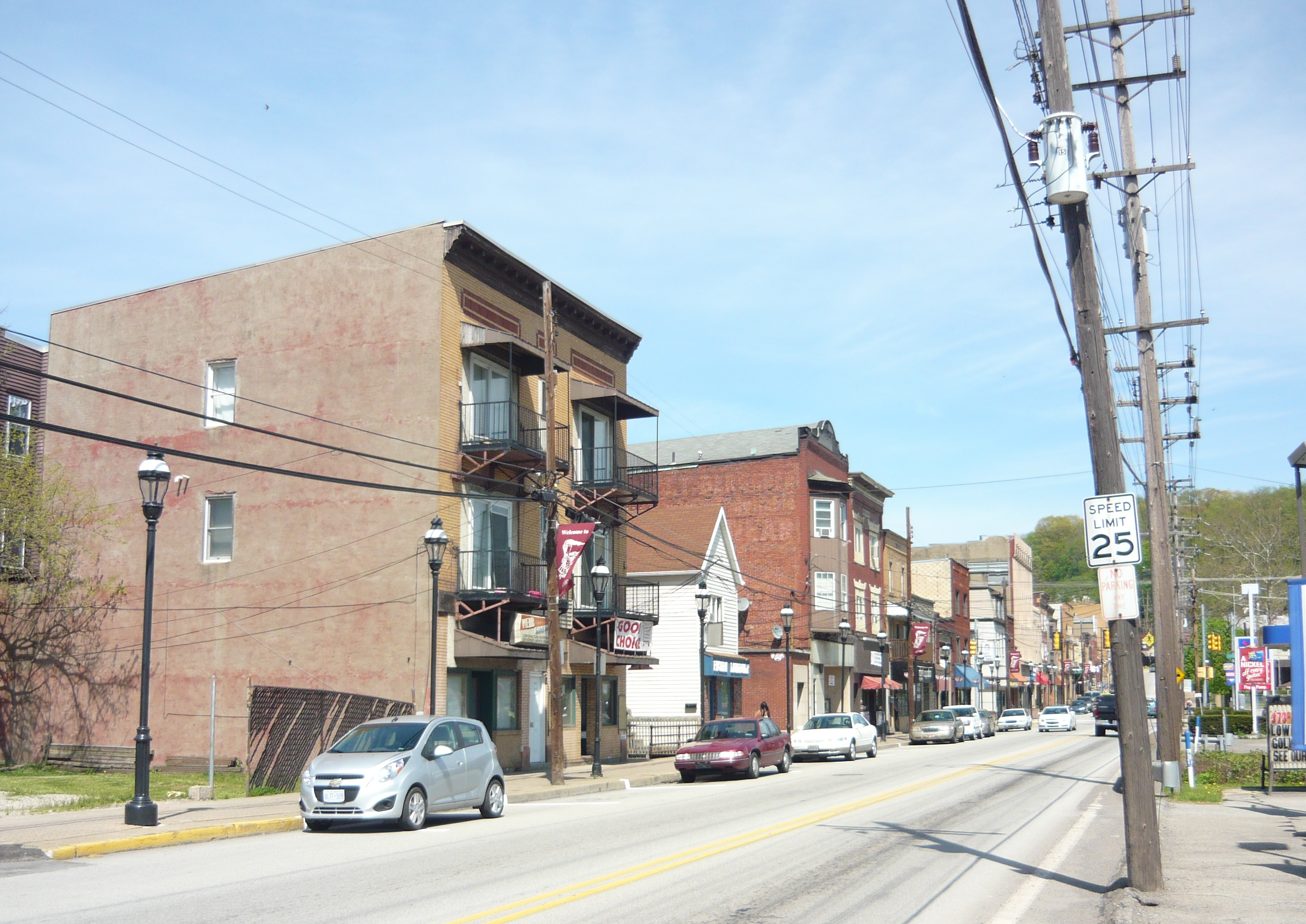
PA 130 in Pitcairn

The route curves southeast and passes under a Union Railroad line, turning east onto four-lane divided Osborne Street. PA 130 becomes Tri Boro Expressway and continues through commercial areas, with the Yellow Belt joining the road at the Thompson Street intersection. The road heads southeast between woods to the northeast and residential areas to the southwest, with the road elevated over the developed areas. The route becomes the border between Turtle Creek to the northeast and the borough of Wilmerding to the southwest before fully entering Wilmerding. PA 130 curves east and comes to an interchange with Patton Street, at which point the Yellow Belt splits from the route by heading south. The road crosses into the borough of Monroeville and runs north of Turtle Creek and Norfolk Southern's Pittsburgh Line as it turns northeast onto two-lane undivided Broadway Boulevard into woodland with some commercial development. The route heads into the borough of Pitcairn and passes downtown businesses, turning southeast. The route heads through woodland as it crosses back into Monroeville. PA 130 intersects PA 48, which also carries the Orange Belt. Past this intersection, the road continues south through more wooded areas of homes and businesses. The route turns east and crosses into the borough of Trafford, becoming 5th Street.

=== Westmoreland County ===
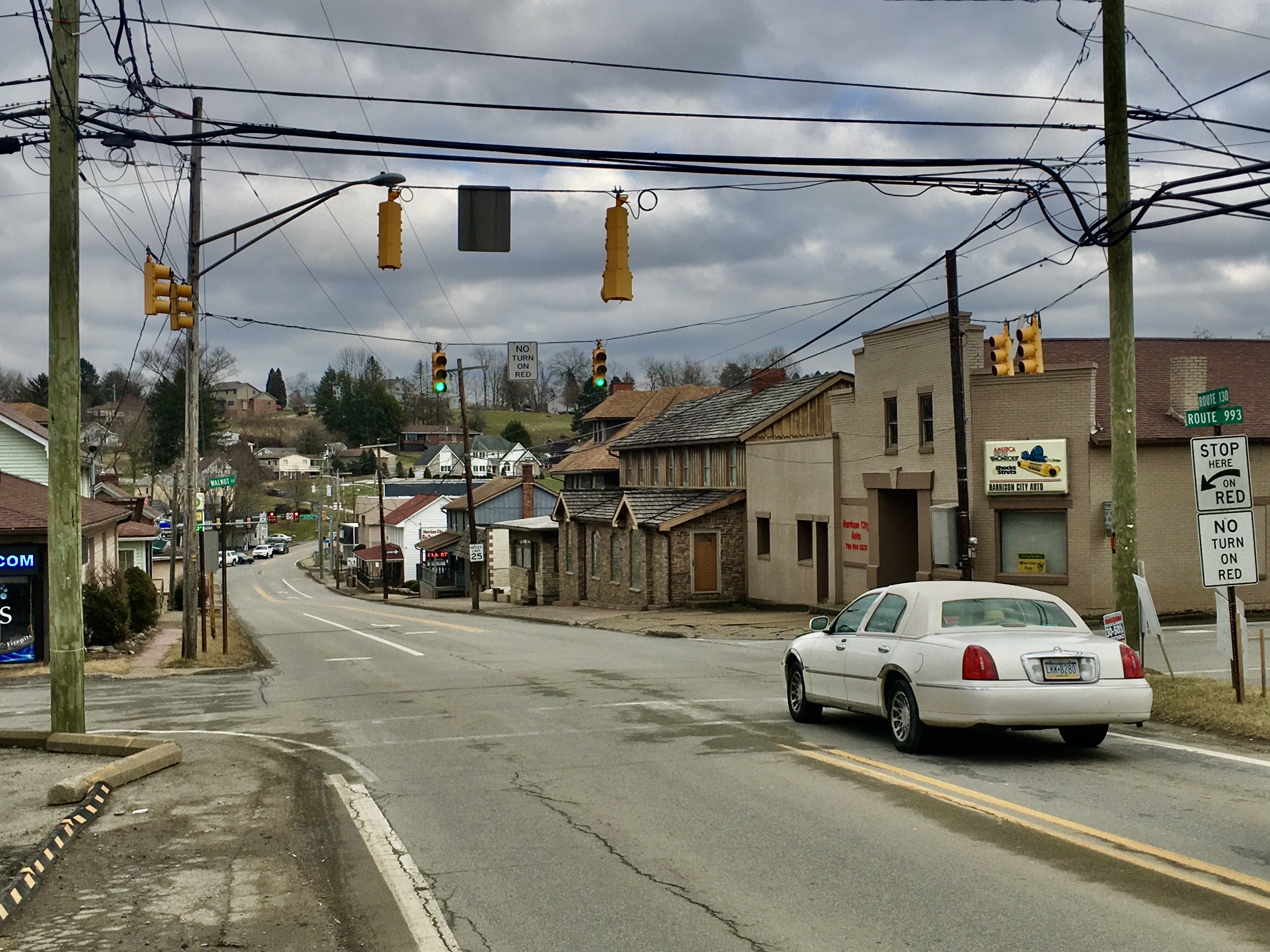
PA 130 through Harrison City

PA 130 comes to a bridge over the Turtle Creek into Westmoreland County, heading east through more of Trafford on the bridge, passing near industrial areas and heading over the abandoned Turtle Creek Industrial Railroad line. After the bridge, the route intersects the western terminus of PA 993 and runs through the commercial downtown, turning northeast onto Forest Avenue and heads into residential areas. PA 130 turns east onto 7th Street and passes more homes. The road turns northeast and becomes the border between Trafford to the northwest and North Huntingdon Township to the southeast, fully entering Trafford again and becomes Seventh Street Extension as it heads through more residential areas with some woods, curving east. The route crosses into Penn Township and becomes Harrison City Road, running through more areas of suburban housing developments. PA 130 continues southeast into more wooded areas of homes with a few businesses as an unnamed road, heading past more commercial establishments and crossing over I-76 (Pennsylvania Turnpike). The road continues into dense areas of housing developments, becoming Harrison City-Jeannette Road. The route comes to another intersection with PA 993 in Harrison City, at which point that route turns southeast and runs concurrently with PA 130, passing more businesses along with a few homes. After a turn to the south, PA 993 splits from PA 130 by turning east onto Bushy Run Road, and PA 130 continues southeast on Harrison Avenue, heading through more residential areas with a few businesses. The road heads through wooded areas with some farm fields and homes before crossing into the city of Jeannette and winding east through residential areas with some woods. The route turns southeast and passes near industry before continuing past several homes with some businesses. PA 130 turns east and briefly heads through Penn Township before crossing the Brush Creek into Hempfield Township. The road becomes unnamed and heads through wooded areas with some nearby homes as a four-lane divided highway. The route comes to an interchange with the PA 66 toll road and continues through more woodland with some homes and fields, becoming College Avenue.

PA 130 turns south and heads into the city of Greensburg, at which point it splits into a one-way pair at the Clopper Street intersection. Eastbound PA 130 continues south on two-lane, two-way, undivided College Avenue, running between the campus of Seton Hill University to the west and residential areas to the east. The road crosses under Norfolk Southern's Pittsburgh Line near the Greensburg station serving Amtrak's Pennsylvanian train and heads into the commercial downtown of Greensburg, becoming Bell Way. Eastbound PA 130 turns east onto one-way West Pittsburgh Street, carrying two travel lanes and coming to an intersection with US 119/PA 819/PA 66 Business. From here, eastbound PA 130 continues east on East Pittsburgh Street concurrent with northbound US 119/PA 819. US 119/PA 819 split to the north and eastbound PA 130 soon rejoins PA 130. Westbound PA 130 heads west into downtown Greensburg on one-way East Otterman Street, carrying three travel lanes. The route becomes concurrent with southbound US 119/PA 819 and continues west carrying two travel lanes. At the intersection with PA 66 Business, US 119/PA 819 turn south to join that route while westbound PA 130 turns north to join PA 66 Business on two-lane, two-way North Main Street. The road crosses Norfolk Southern's Pittsburgh Line and heads into residential areas, with westbound PA 130 splitting from PA 66 Business by heading west on Clopper Street, passing more homes before rejoining eastbound PA 130.

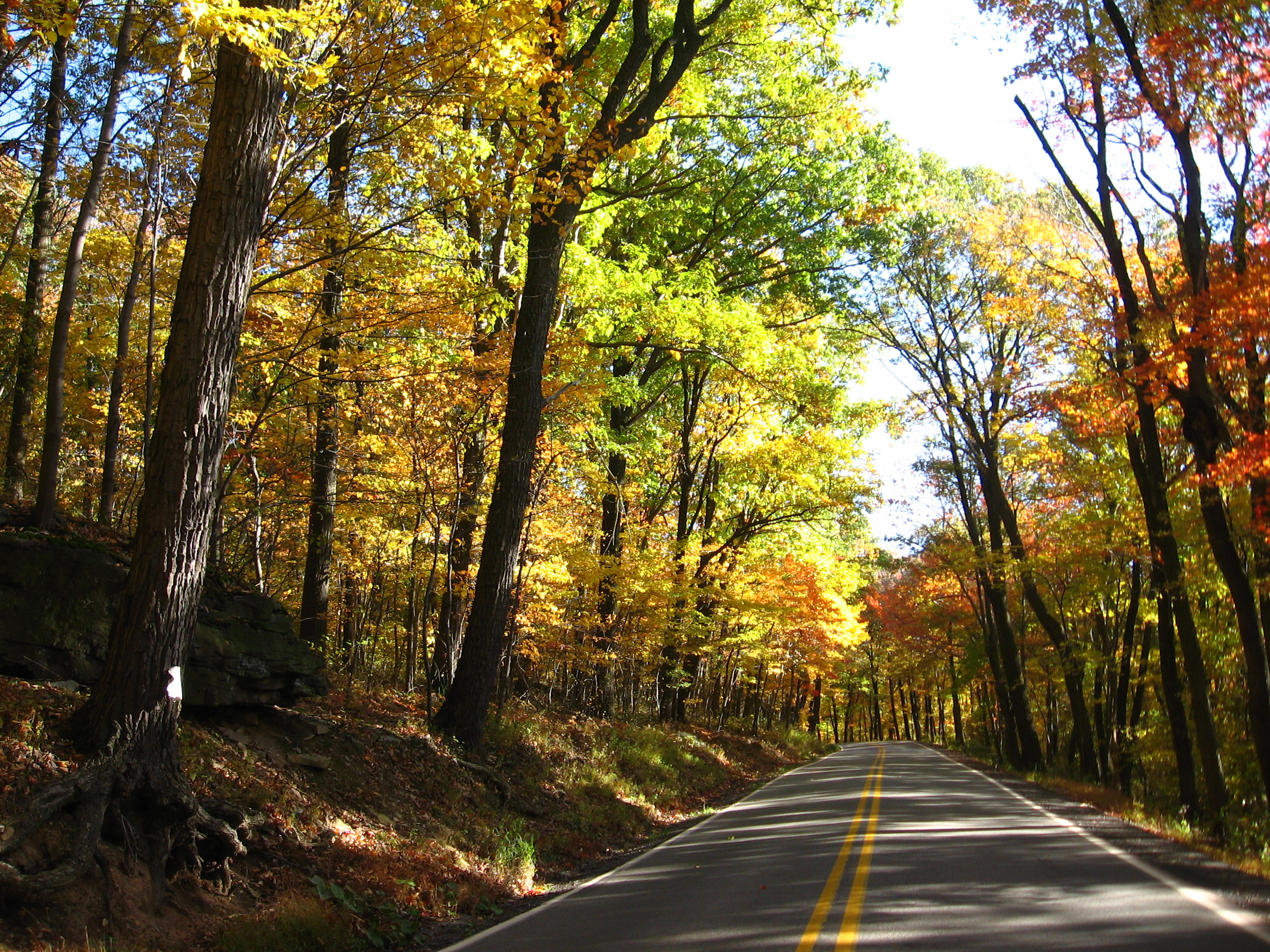
Autumn colors near Stahlstown on PA 130

At the end of the one-way pair, both directions of PA 130 head east on two-lane undivided East Pittsburgh Street, crossing under the Southwest Pennsylvania Railroad's Greensburg Industrial Track line and the Five Star Trail, passing homes and businesses. The route heads into commercial areas and turns southeast onto Humphrey Road, with East Pittsburgh Street continuing east to provide access to and from the eastbound direction of US 30. PA 130 heads through residential areas in Hempfield Township with some commercial establishments, coming to an interchange with access to and from the westbound direction of the US 30 freeway. The road passes through more residential neighborhoods in Stonevilla before turning south into more wooded areas with a few homes as an unnamed road. The route winds southeast through more woodland with some nearby housing developments, crossing into Unity Township as it passes to the southwest of Unity Reservoir. PA 130 becomes Pleasant Unity Road and heads into a mix of farmland and woodland with some homes, becoming unnamed again. The route turns southwest onto Myers Road before turning south onto another unnamed road. PA 130 turns east and curves south through more rural areas with some housing developments, curving southeast and making a turn to the northeast at Humphreys. The road curves east-southeast and heads into the residential community of Pleasant Unity, coming to an intersection with PA 981. Here, PA 981 turns east to form a concurrency with PA 130, with the road heading southeast through more of the community. PA 981 splits to the northeast and PA 130 continues southeast into open agricultural areas with some woods and homes.

The road becomes the border between Unity Township to the northeast and Mount Pleasant Township to the southwest as it forms a short concurrency with PA 982 in Lycippus. The route heads through more farmland as an unnamed road and heads into forested areas, crossing Chestnut Ridge. PA 130 turns south to fully enter Mount Pleasant Township before curving southeast into Donegal Township. The road becomes the border between Cook Township to the northeast and Donegal Township to the southwest and heads through more forests with some farm fields and homes. The route comes to an intersection with PA 711 in Stahlstown and continues through more forested areas. PA 130 turns east fully into Cook Township and runs a short distance to the north of I-70/I-76 (Pennsylvania Turnpike) before reaching its eastern terminus at an intersection with PA 381.

== History ==
Pennsylvania Route 180
- Location: Pittsburgh–Cook Township
- Existed: 1932–1961

Pennsylvania Route 186
- Location: Pittsburgh–Greensburg
- Existed: 1936–1941

Originally, the PA 130 designation between Greensburg and Turtle Creek was known as PA 993 from 1928 until 1932. In 1932, PA 993 was replaced by PA 180 and extended west toward PA 380 near Pittsburgh. In 1936, PA 186 replaced PA 180, and PA 180 was shifted to an alignment continuing east of its old alignment to PA 381 in Cook Township. In 1941, the PA 186 designation was eliminated, and PA 180 took its place from PA 380 near Pittsburgh to PA 381 in Cook Township. With the introduction of the Interstate Highway System, Interstate 180 was introduced as a spur highway of I-80 into Williamsport. As a result, the PA 180 designation was replaced by PA 130 in 1961.

In 1971, the Tri-Boro Expressway was completed, of which a portion of PA 130 runs concurrent. PA 130 joins the expressway Brown Avenue and continues east to State Street in Allegheny County. In 1998, PA 130 was rerouted along College Avenue and Bell Way, a one-way pair in Greensburg.

== Future ==
In 2019, the Pennsylvania Turnpike Commission (PTC) announced that it would begin work to construct a new interchange in Penn Township that would connect the Pennsylvania Turnpike to PA 130. The interchange would involve cashless tolling. On October 28, 2021, it was announced that design work on the interchange would begin. The interchange between the turnpike and PA 130 is projected to be completed in 2026.

== Major intersections ==
County	Location	mi	km	Destinations	Notes
Allegheny	Pittsburgh	0.000	0.000	PA 8 / Blue Belt / Green Belt (Washington Boulevard) – Squirrel Hill, Millvale	Western terminus of PA 130 and its concurrency with the Green Belt
Allegheny	Penn Hills	3.623	5.831	Green Belt (Verona Road (SR 2058))	Eastern terminus of Green Belt concurrency
Allegheny	Penn Hills	4.813	7.746	PA 380 (Frankstown Road) – Plum, Pittsburgh	
Allegheny	Churchill	6.044	9.727	I-376 east / US 22 east (Penn-Lincoln Parkway) / William Penn Highway (SR 2110) – Monroeville, Pittsburgh	Exit 79B (I-376); no direct access to I-376/US 22 west
Allegheny	Turtle Creek	9.221	14.840	Yellow Belt (Thompson Street (SR 2065))	Western terminus of Yellow Belt concurrency
Allegheny	Wilmerding	10.516– 10.697	16.924– 17.215	Yellow Belt (Patton Street) – Wilmerding, East McKeesport	Eastern end of Yellow Belt concurrency; interchange; eastbound entrance to PA 130 via State Street
Allegheny	Monroeville	12.816	20.625	PA 48 / Orange Belt (Mosside Boulevard) – Monroeville, White Oak	
Westmoreland	Trafford	13.836	22.267	PA 993 east (Brinton Avenue)	Western terminus of PA 993
Westmoreland	Penn Township	21.054	33.883	PA 993 west (Manor Harrison City Road) – Manor, Irwin	Western end of PA 993 concurrency
Westmoreland	Penn Township	21.216	34.144	PA 993 east (Bushy Run Road) – Bushy Run Battlefield	Eastern end of PA 993 concurrency
Westmoreland	Hempfield Township	25.616– 25.815	41.225– 41.545	PA Turnpike 66 (Amos K. Hutchinson Bypass) – Delmont, New Stanton	Exit 8 (PA 66); E-ZPass or toll-by-plate
Westmoreland	Greensburg	28.646	46.101	US 119 south / PA 819 south / PA 66 Bus. north (South Main Street)	Western end of US 119/PA 819 concurrency; southern terminus of PA 66 Bus.
Westmoreland	Greensburg	28.842	46.417	US 119 north / PA 819 north (Arch Avenue)	Eastern end of US 119/PA 819 concurrency
Westmoreland	Greensburg	29.656	47.727	East Pittsburgh Street (SR 3030) to US 30 east	
Westmoreland	Hempfield Township	29.984– 30.088	48.255– 48.422	US 30 west (Lincoln Highway)	Access to US 30 westbound / from US 30 eastbound only; interchange
Westmoreland	Unity Township	35.921	57.809	PA 981 south / Marguerite Road (SR 2019)	Western end of PA 981 concurrency
Westmoreland	Unity Township	36.431– 36.480	58.630– 58.709	PA 981 north (Pleasant Unity Road)	Eastern end of PA 981 concurrency
Westmoreland	Mount Pleasant–Unity township line	37.760	60.769	PA 982 south	Western end of PA 982 concurrency
Westmoreland	Mount Pleasant–Unity township line	37.832	60.885	PA 982 north	Eastern end of PA 982 concurrency
Westmoreland	Cook–Donegal township line	46.284	74.487	PA 711 – Ligonier, Donegal	
Westmoreland	Cook Township	49.273	79.297	PA 381 / Felgar Road – Rector, Jones Mill	Eastern terminus of PA 130
1.000 mi = 1.609 km; 1.000 km = 0.621 mi: Concurrency terminus; Electronic toll collection; Incomplete access
