= Pennsylvania Route 993 =

State highway in Westmoreland County, Pennsylvania, US

Pennsylvania Route 993

Route information
- Maintained by PennDOT
- Length: 14.4 mi (23.2 km)
- Existed: 1928–present

Major junctions
- West end: PA 130 in Trafford
- PA 130 in Harrison City
- East end: PA 66 Bus. in Hempfield Township

Location
- Country: United States
- State: Pennsylvania
- Counties: Westmoreland

Highway system
- Pennsylvania State Route System; Interstate; US; State; Scenic; Legislative
← PA 992	→ PA 994

Pennsylvania Route 993 (PA 993) is a 14.4-mile-long (23.2 km) state highway located in Westmoreland County, Pennsylvania. The western terminus is at PA 130 in Trafford. The eastern terminus is at PA 66 Business in Hempfield Township. The route connects several of the eastern suburban communities of Pittsburgh, before ending in a rural area in between two urbanized fingers, Jeannette and Greensburg.

== Route description ==
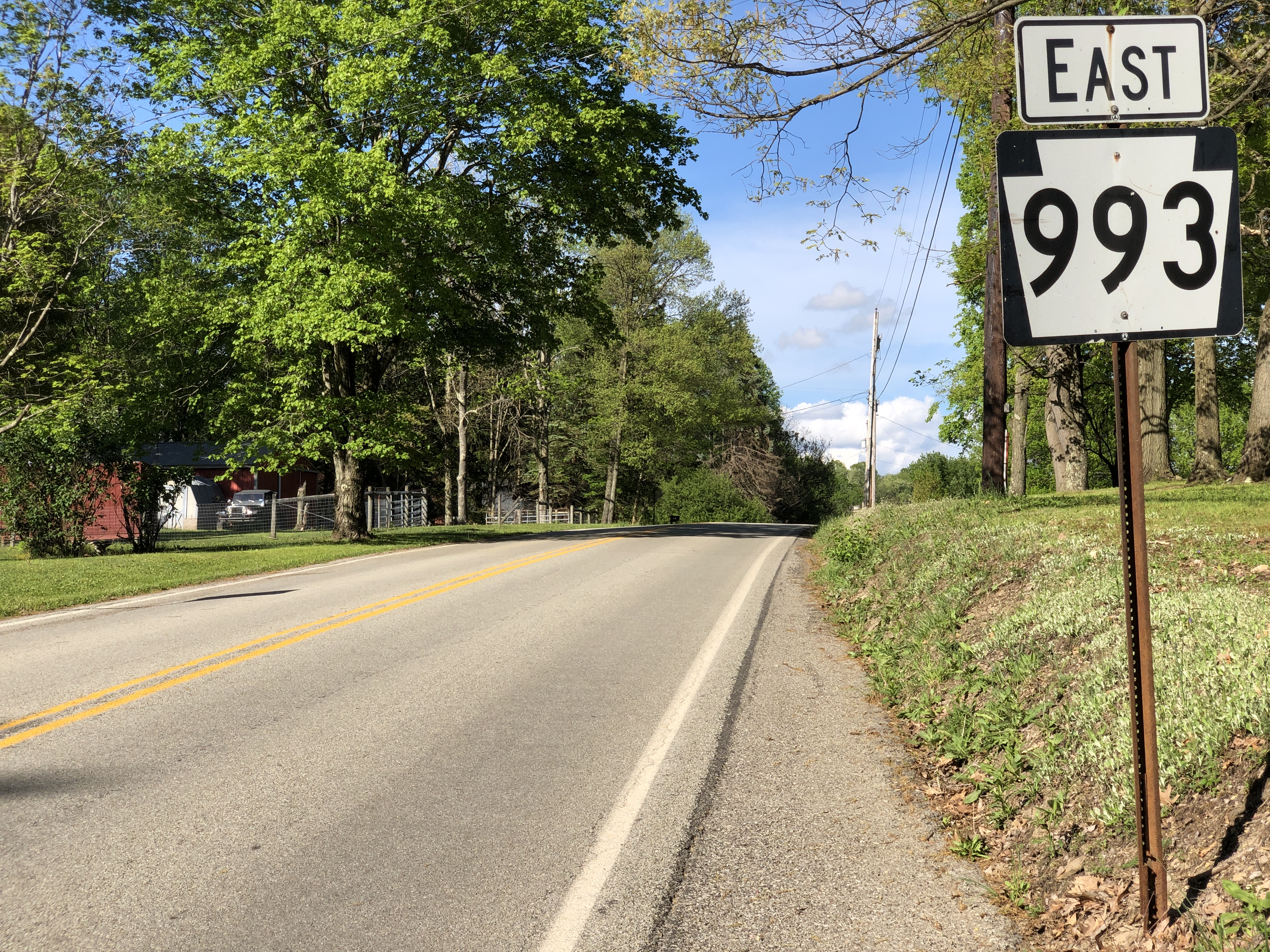
PA 993 eastbound in Penn Township

PA 993 begins at an intersection with PA 130 in the borough of Trafford, heading south on two-lane undivided Brinton Avenue. The route heads through residential and business areas, curving southeast along East Brinton Avenue through more areas of homes. The road heads into North Huntingdon Township and becomes Trafford Road, turning east at Cavittsville and runs through woods, crossing the Brush Creek before passing a field and turning southeast into wooded areas with some development, with the creek winding across the road, crossing it three times. PA 993 runs through Ardara, at which point it runs a short distance to the east of Norfolk Southern's Pittsburgh Line. The route passes through more forested areas, curving south onto Water Street and passing under the railroad line near residential Larimer, at which point it crosses the Brush Creek and again winds southeast along the creek. The road passes through more woodland with some industrial development, turning east and continuing into the borough of Irwin. PA 993 passes homes and businesses, turning south onto Main Street, where it passes more businesses. The route heads east onto 3rd Street and heads through residential areas. Crossing back into North Huntingdon Township, the road becomes Broadway Street and passes through woods before running through areas of homes and industry in Shafton.

PA 993 passes under I-76 (Pennsylvania Turnpike) and continues into the residential community of Westmoreland City. The route heads northeast, becoming the border between North Huntingdon Township to the north and the borough of Manor to the south as it turns east onto Main Street and runs to the south of the Norfolk Southern line. PA 993 turns north onto Manor Harrison City Road and passes under the railroad line, turning northeast into wooded residential areas. The road continues northeast near more rural areas of homes along with some fields, crossing into Penn Township. The route reaches an intersection with PA 130 in a commercial area of the community of Harrison City. Here, PA 993 turns east to form a concurrency with PA 130 on Harrison City-Jeannette Road, passing more businesses along with a few homes. After a turn to the south, PA 993 splits from PA 130 by turning east onto Bushy Run Road, passing more residences. Farther east, the route heads into a mix of farmland and woodland with some homes, passing Bushy Run Battlefield. PA 993 passes through more rural areas with occasional residences as it continues into Hempfield Township and comes to its eastern terminus at PA 66 Business.

== Major intersections ==
The entire route is in Westmoreland County.

Location	mi	km	Destinations	Notes
Trafford	0.000	0.000	PA 130 (5th Street)	Western terminus
Penn Township	9.879	15.899	PA 130 west	West end of PA 130 overlap
Penn Township	10.036	16.151	PA 130 east	East end of PA 130 overlap
Hempfield Township	14.409	23.189	PA 66 Bus. – Greensburg, Delmont	Eastern terminus
1.000 mi = 1.609 km; 1.000 km = 0.621 mi: Concurrency terminus
