= Penn-Trafford High School =

Coordinates: 40.3536°N 79.6566°W

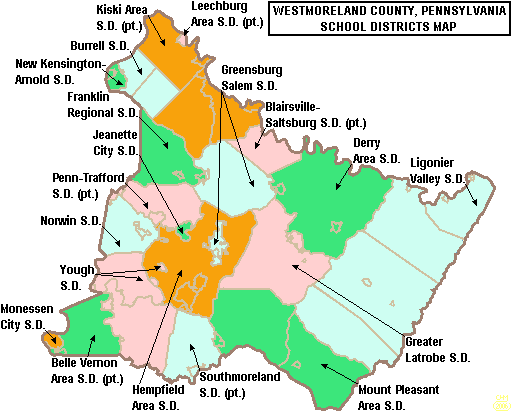

Location
- 3381 Route 130; Harrison City, Allegheny, Westmoreland, Pennsylvania 15636; United States

Information
- Type: Public
- Established: 1972
- School district: Penn-Trafford School District
- Principal: Tony Aquilio
- Staff: 67.50 (FTE)
- Grades: 9-12
- Enrollment: 1,167 (2024–2025)
- Student to teacher ratio: 17.29
- Mascot: Warrior
- Team name: Warriors or Lady Warriors
- Website: http://pths.penntrafford.org/

Penn-Trafford School District region in Allegheny County

Penn-Trafford High School is a public high school located in Harrison City, Pennsylvania in Westmoreland County, and is the secondary school serving the Penn-Trafford School District. It is the result of several mergers of smaller school districts and entities. It is the successor of Penn Joint High School and Trafford High School. The school colors are green and gold. The different government entities that are incorporated into this school district are, in size order, Penn Township, Trafford Borough, Manor Borough (part), and Penn Borough. The school district is mainly in Westmoreland County, Pennsylvania with a small part of Trafford Borough in Allegheny County, Pennsylvania.

The school opened in the fall of 1972 and graduated its first class in June 1973, with Reynold Peduzzi its first principal and William G. Kuznik serving as Penn-Trafford Superintendent at that time.

== Extracurriculars ==
The Penn-Trafford School District offers a large variety of clubs, activities and sports.

=== Athletics ===
Penn-Trafford participates in the Western Pennsylvania Interscholastic Athletic League (WPIAL). The colors are Dartmouth Green and Green Bay Gold. The nickname of the school's teams are the Warriors. In keeping with the Native American theme of the two high schools that merged to form Penn-Trafford, Warriors was chosen. The nickname of Penn Joint High School (a predecessor to Penn-Trafford) was the Indians. The nickname of Trafford High School (a predecessor to Penn-Trafford) was the Tomahawks. In 1971-1972, prior to the merger of the two high schools, a panel of eight students, four from each high school met to develop the new school nickname and color-schemes. The student body of each school were given the task of voting on the new school colors from three color-scheme options chosen by the student panel, Kelly Green and Green Bay Gold being one of them. The color-scheme options were selected by the panel to differentiate Penn-Trafford from the other Keystone Conference member schools. The top vote getter was Green and Gold. Dartmouth Green eventually replaced Kelly Green.

The Warriors Girls Golf team won the WPIAL championships during the 2012- 2013 and the 2013-2014 seasons. In both competitive years, they proceeded to the PIAA state championships where they placed as runners- up.

The Warriors Field Hockey team won the WPIAL championships in 2011, 2016, 2017, 2018, 2019, and 2020.

The Penn-Trafford Men's Volleyball team won three Section Championships in 2016, 2017, and 2018. They also won their first WPIAL Championship game in 2016.

In 2021, Penn-Trafford football won the Pennsylvania state championship in the 5A class. It was their first ever championship in the schools history.

=== List of Penn-Trafford high clubs ===
Academic Quiz Team, Art, A.S.L. (American Sign Language), Astronomy, Band, Barbershop Harmony Society, Biology, Bots IQ, C.A.P. (Community Action Program), Chess, Chorus/Encore, Colorguard, Drama Guild, Engineering, Fashion Club, F.B.L.A. (Future Business Leaders of America), FGR (French German Russian), Indoor Track and Field, Math, Mock Trial, N.H.S (National Honor Society), Newspaper, Prom, S.A.D.D. (Students Against Destructive Decisions), Ski and Snowboard, Spanish Honor Society, Stage Crew, Student Union, Traces, Trap, Unified Club, Video, Warrior Esports, Warriors for All, Women in Science, Yearbook.

=== Marching Band ===
When Penn High School and Trafford High School merged to form Penn-Trafford, the Marching Band used both the Penn and Trafford uniforms and was known as "The Big Green Machine". Later it was known as the Warrior Marching Band. In 2011 Penn-Trafford hosted a band show dedicated to the founding director who directed the band from 1972-1986.

The band competes in Class AAA in PIMBA (they originally performed in AAAA until 2013) and Class 3 Open in TOB. They hosted the PIMBA Championships in 1999, 2001, 2004, 2010, 2012, and 2014 and the TOB Chapter 8 Championships in 2016, 2017, and 2018. The band is also a BOA Regional Finalist and a seven-time TOB Class 3 Open Champion.

== Notable alumni ==
- Paul Zeise, radio host and columnist
