= Penn-Trafford School District =

School district in Pennsylvania

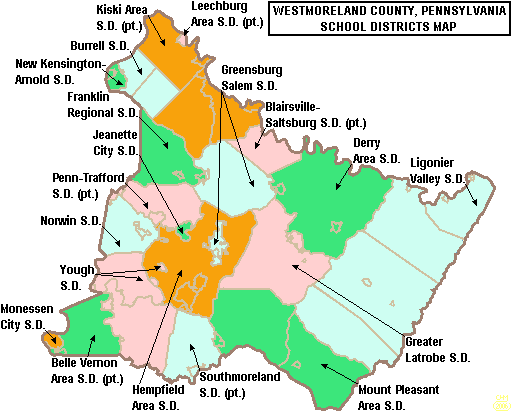
- Location of Penn-Trafford School District in Westmoreland County

Address
- 1006 Harrison City/Export Road Harrison City, Pennsylvania, Allegheny and Westmoreland Counties, 15085; United States

District information
- Type: Public

Students and staff
- District mascot: Warrior
- Colors: Green and Gold

Other information
- Website: www.penntrafford.org

Penn-Trafford School District area in eastern Allegheny County

The Penn-Trafford School District is a public school district that serves western Westmoreland County, Pennsylvania and a small portion of Allegheny County, Pennsylvania. The district is governed by a locally elected, nine member school board who serve, staggered four-year terms, the Pennsylvania General Assembly and the Pennsylvania Department of Education. The district neighbors 7 other school districts: Franklin Regional, Greensburg-Salem, Hempfield Area, Jeannette City, Norwin, Gateway, and East Allegheny. The district mascot is the Warrior.

The Suburban Pittsburgh district serves the municipalities of Trafford, Penn, Penn Township, Manor, and Harrison City.

== Schools ==
- Elementary (K-5)
  - McCullough Elementary
  - Level Green Elementary
  - Sunrise Estates Elementary
  - Trafford Elementary
  - Harrison Park Elementary
- Middle (6-8)
  - Penn Middle
  - Trafford Middle
- High school (9-12)
  - Penn-Trafford High School

The Penn-Trafford School District is the public school system of the following County entities; Penn Township, Trafford Borough, Penn Borough, and parts of Manor Borough. All areas of the Penn-Trafford School District are in Westmoreland County except for a small area of Trafford Borough that is part of Allegheny County.

Penn-Trafford grew out of the Penn Joint school system that was formed in 1951 when Penn Township and Penn Borough formed a partnership. In 1956 Trafford Borough became a third party to form a district administrative unit under the County Plan for the Reorganization of School Districts, however all three areas retained their own identity in the joint school system. In 1963 Manor Borough annexed part of Penn Township but the annexed area remained within the Penn Joint school system. In the meantime plans for a full merger of Penn Joint and Trafford were initiated in 1961 and were finalized in 1965 when the Commonwealth of Pennsylvania approved the Penn-Trafford School District as Administrative Unit XV of the Westmoreland County Plan.

Penn Middle School and Trafford Middle School are the previous high schools before the school districts joined. Trafford Middle's boundaries now include a large area of Penn Township to roughly equalize the school sizes of the two middle schools.
