= Pennsylvania Route 66 =

State highway in Pennsylvania, US

Pennsylvania Route 66
- Major highways in Western Pennsylvania with PA 66 in red and alternate routes in blue

Route information
- Maintained by PennDOT and PTC
- Length: 139.7 mi (224.8 km)
- Existed: 1927–present
- Component highways: PA Turnpike 66 from New Stanton to Delmont; PA 66 from Delmont to Kane

Major junctions
- South end: US 119 in New Stanton
- US 30 near Greensburg; US 22 near Delmont; PA 56 in Apollo; US 422 in Kittanning; PA 28 in New Bethlehem; I-80 near Clarion
- North end: US 6 in Kane

Location
- Country: United States
- State: Pennsylvania
- Counties: Westmoreland, Armstrong, Clarion, Forest, Elk, McKean

Highway system
- Pennsylvania State Route System; Interstate; US; State; Scenic; Legislative
← PA 65	→ PA 67
← PA 564	→ PA 568

Pennsylvania Route 66 (PA 66) is a 139.7-mile-long (224.8 km) state highway in Western Pennsylvania. Its southern terminus is at U.S. Route 119 (US 119) near Interstate 70 (I-70) near New Stanton. Its northern terminus is at US 6 in Kane.

The southernmost 13.7 miles (22.0 km) of the route is a controlled-access toll road named the Amos K. Hutchinson Bypass and is signed as PA Turnpike 66, a part of the Pennsylvania Turnpike System serving as a bypass of Greensburg. The Bypass runs between US 119 and US 22. This portion is also part of Corridor M of the Appalachian Development Highway System.

== Route description ==
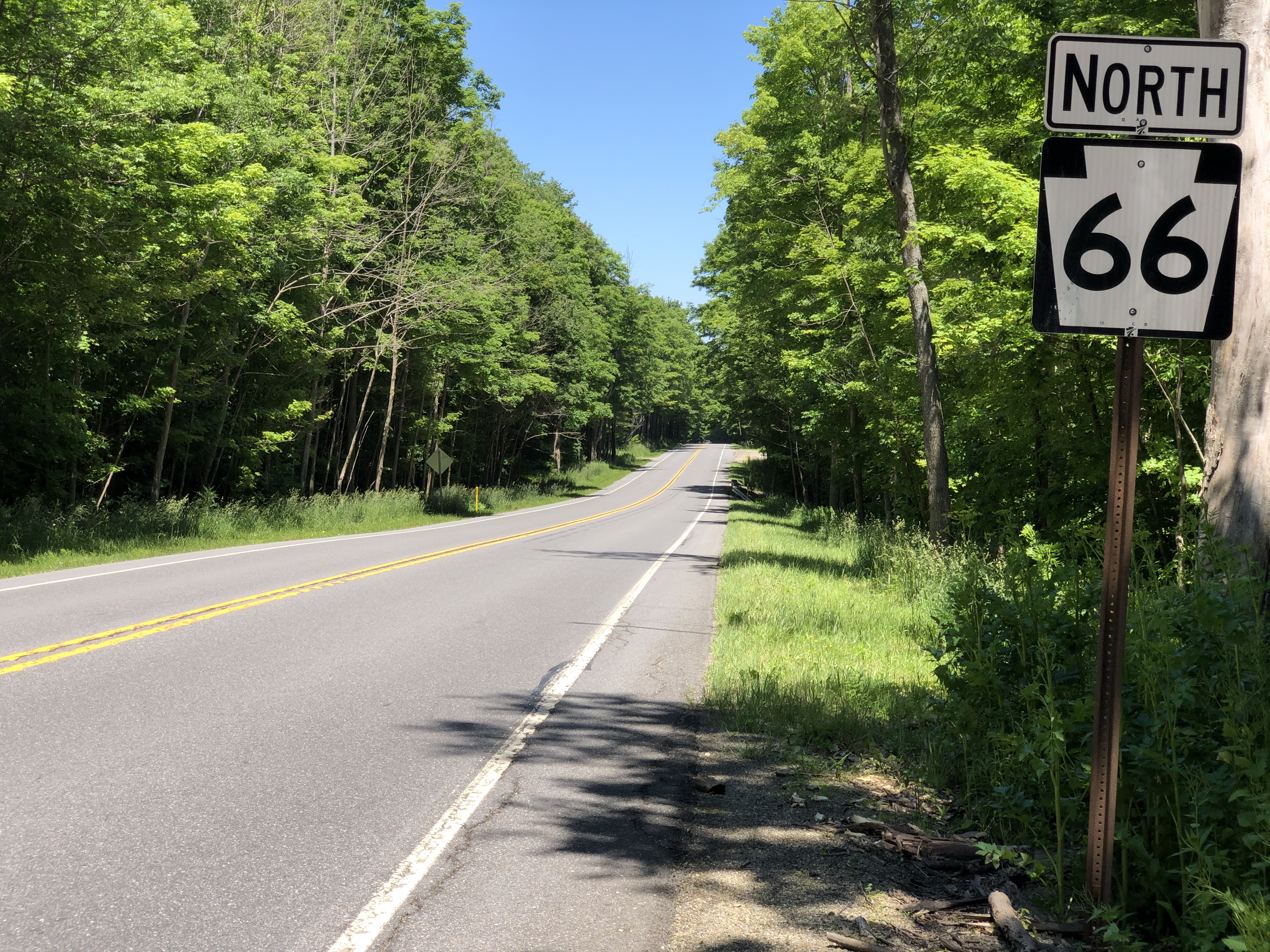
PA 66 northbound in Highland Township

=== Amos K. Hutchinson Bypass ===
PA Turnpike 66 begins in New Stanton at a cloverleaf interchange with US 119, near the New Stanton Interchange of the Pennsylvania Turnpike (I-70/I-76). Up to Arona Road, its first interchange, no tolls are collected. The route then meets PA 136 before reaching the Hempfield Toll Plaza.

Near Jeannette, PA Turnpike 66 interchanges with US 30 and PA 130. North of here, the road meets PA 66 Business before reaching the northern terminus of the same route 3 miles (4.8 km) further north.

At this point, PA Turnpike 66 becomes PA 66 and the freeway ends at a traffic signal just north. PA 66 then meets US 22 at a single-point urban interchange.

=== Westmoreland County ===
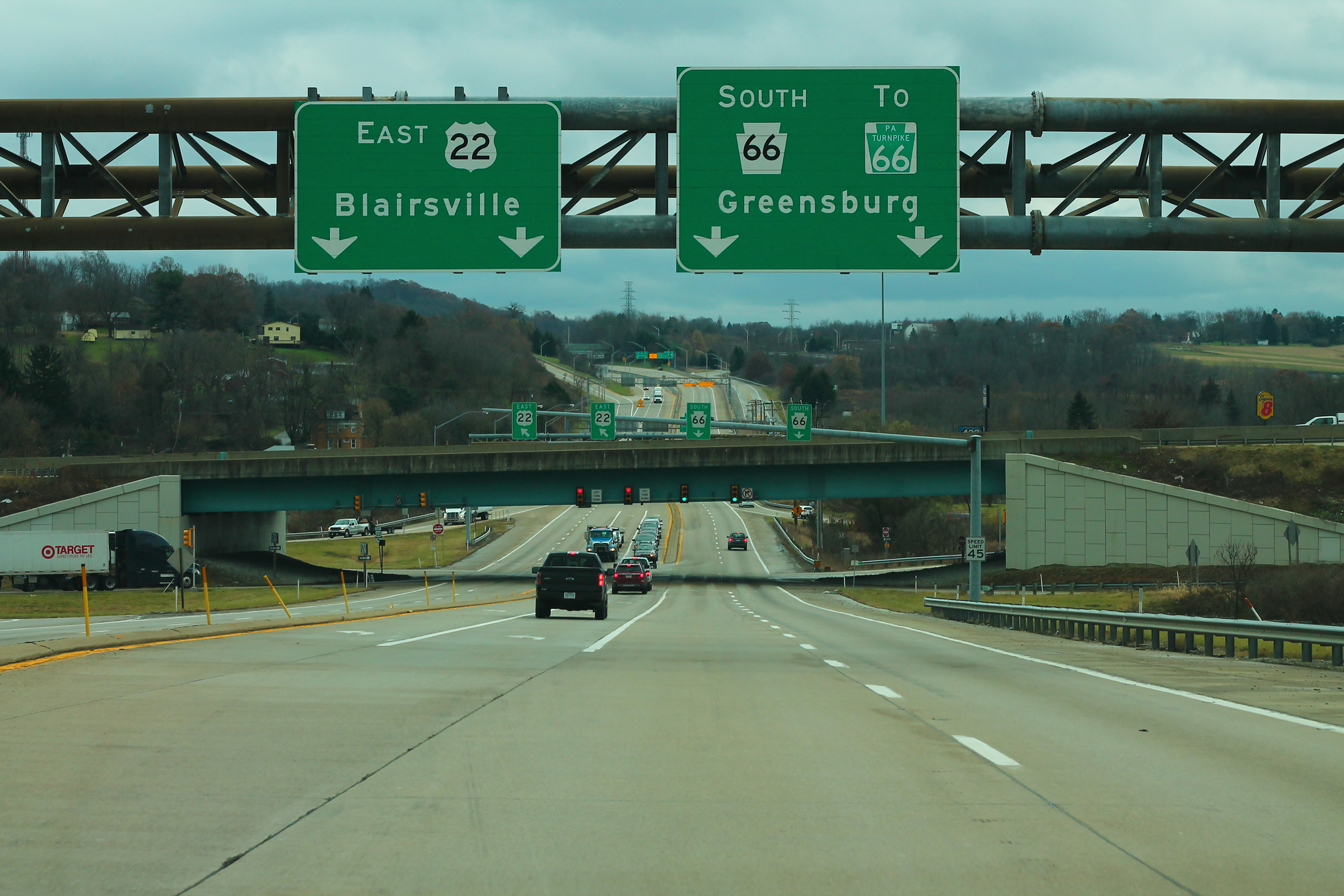
PA 66 southbound at the US 22 interchange near Delmont

North of the Amos K. Hutchinson Bypass, PA 66 enters Salem Township as Sheridan Road. In Delmont, PA 66 is called Sheridan Road. In Washington Township, PA 66 passes west of Beaver Run Reservoir.

In the village of Mamont, PA 66 intersects Pennsylvania Route 286. In the village of Poke Run north of PA 286, PA 66 intersects the eastern terminus of Pennsylvania Route 366. Then PA 66 intersects Pennsylvania Route 380, PA 380 west heads for downtown Pittsburgh.

South of Oklahoma, PA 66 intersects the southern terminus of Pennsylvania Route 356. In the village of Paulton, PA 66 intersects the southern terminus of Pennsylvania Route 66 Alternate.

PA 66 Alternate goes into Vandergrift and PA 66 goes into Apollo. In Oklahoma, PA 66 meets the northern terminus of Pennsylvania Route 819. In downtown Oklahoma, PA 66 turns to the east and crosses the Kiskiminetas River.

=== Armstrong County ===
After crossing the Kiskiminetas River, PA 66 enters Armstrong County and begins a concurrency with Pennsylvania Route 56 in Apollo. As they began their concurrency, PA 56/PA 66 are called Warren Avenue in Apollo. As PA 56/PA 66 enter the boro of North Apollo they parallel the Kiskiminetas River. In the village of North Vandergrift, the concurrency between PA 56 and PA 66 ends when PA 66 intersects PA 66 Alternate and PA 56 and PA 66 ALT begin their own concurrency into Vandergrift.

As PA 66 continues to parallel the Kiskiminetas River, it is called Lincoln Avenue. While paralleling the Kiskiminetas River, PA 66 has snake like curves. In Leechburg, PA 66 becomes Market Street, 3rd Street, and Pershing Avenue. As PA 66 exits Leechburg it does not parallel the Kiskiminetas River.

In Bethel Township, PA 66 meets the northern terminus of PA 66 Alternate. In Ford City, PA 66 becomes Main Street and intersects the northern terminus of Pennsylvania Route 128 at an "Y" intersection.

Southeast of Kittanning, PA 66 begins a concurrency with U.S. Route 422 and Pennsylvania Route 28 at an interchange. At the next exit US 422 leaves the concurrency and PA 28/PA 66 continue north at-grade.

In Rayburn Township, PA 28/PA 66 intersect the western terminus of Pennsylvania Route 85. PA 28/PA 66 continue towards the northeast without intersecting a route for more than 17 miles (27 km).

In South Bethlehem, PA 28/PA 66 become Broad Street and meet the northern terminus of Pennsylvania Route 839. The route then crosses the Redbank Creek into Clarion County after spending 43 miles in Armstrong County.

=== Clarion County ===
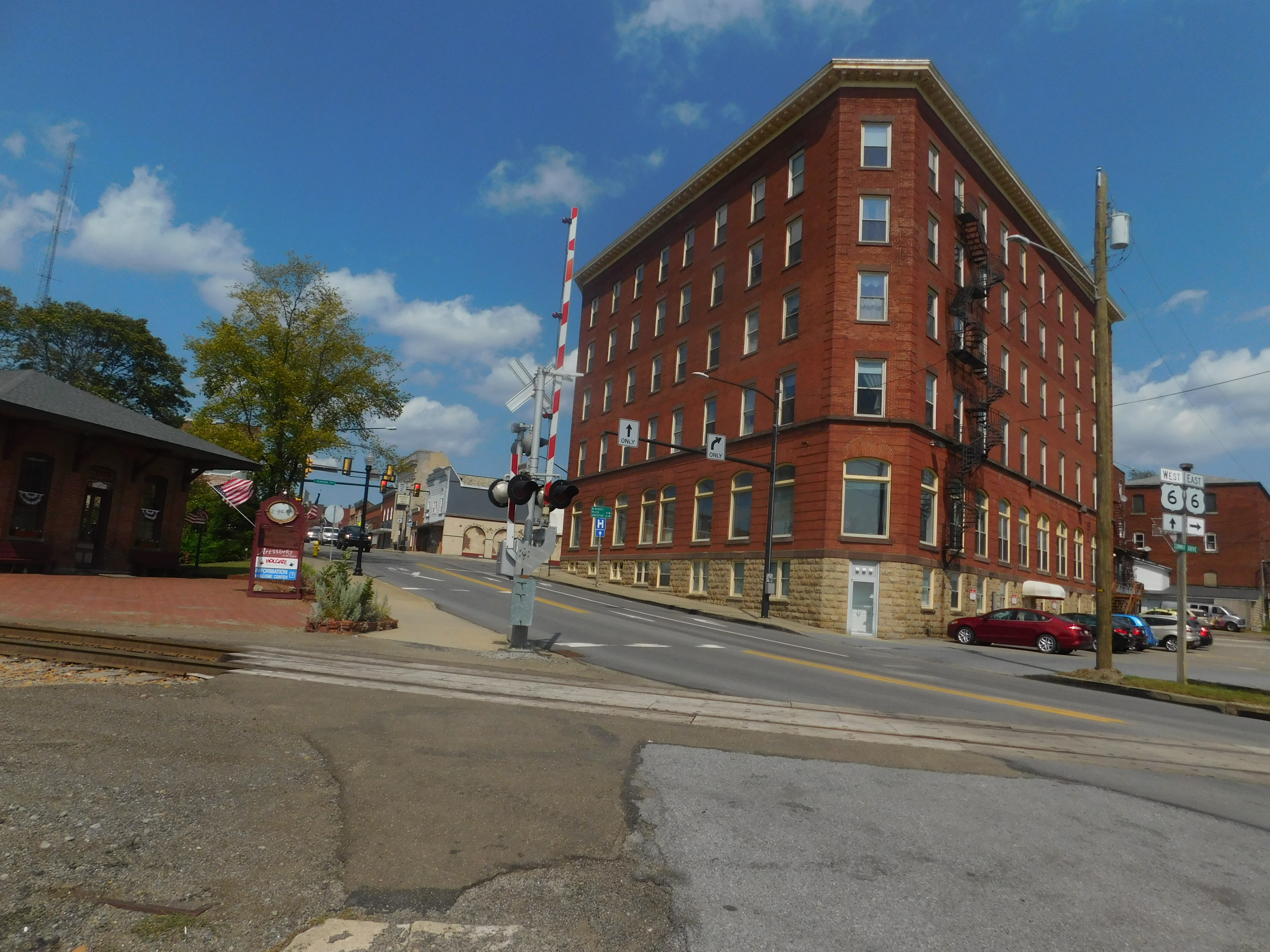
PA 66 approaching its end at US 6 in Kane

After crossing the Redbank Creek, PA 28/PA 66 enter Clarion County. In New Bethlehem, the concurrency between PA 28 and PA 66 ends when PA 66 leaves PA 28.

North of PA 28, PA 66 becomes Wood Street and intersects the eastern terminus of Pennsylvania Route 861. In Clarion Township, PA 66 begins a concurrency with Interstate 80 at exit 64. Then I-80/PA 66 meet Pennsylvania Route 68 at exit 62.

After crossing the Clarion River, PA 66 leaves I-80 at exit 60 (trumpet interchange). PA 66 continues north at grade. In Paint Township, PA 66 intersects U.S. Route 322 as Paint Boulevard. PA 66 continues towards the north paralleling rail road tracks.

In Farmington Township, PA 66 intersects Pennsylvania Route 36.

=== Forest, Elk, and McKean counties ===
As PA 66 enters Forest County, PA 66 intersects the northern terminus of Pennsylvania Route 899. In Jenks Township, PA 66 enters Allegheny National Forest. As PA 66 enters Elk County, PA 66 has a 2 miles (3 km) concurrency with Pennsylvania Route 948. Northeast of PA 948, PA 66 becomes Kane-Russell City Road. PA 66 enters McKean County as Fraley Street. In Kane, PA 66 ends at a "T" intersection with U.S. Route 6.

== History ==
The original road was designated in 1927.

In 1930, the section from West Virginia to Greensburg was decommissioned in favor of US 119. Following this, in 1935, the northern terminus was relocated to Tionesta.

Construction on the US 22/PA 66 cloverleaf was completed in 1958.

In 1960, the designation was moved from Courthouse Road to bypass Kittanning on a new alignment.

In 1968, route moved onto I-80 to bypass Clarion and onto its current route between Clarion Junction and Kane. That same year, PA 66 was routed onto its current alignment from US 322 north to its current terminus.

In 1982, the road was widened to four lanes with a median from Ford City to US 422.

From August 1990 to December 1993, the Amos K. Hutchinson Bypass was opened as an extension. It was designated as PA Turnpike 66 and designated as the Amos K. Hutchinson Bypass. It was tolled, and supported cash, as well as a system known as the PTC Credit Card.

From 1999 to 2000, the interchange with US 22 was rebuilt into a SPUI.

From 2000 to 2001, the Kittitang Bypass was opened.

E-ZPass was added to the Amos K. Hutchinson Bypass in October 2006.

In Westmoreland County, part of the road was dangerous in Winter due to ice. This was corrected in 2011 as part of a resurfacing.

In 2016, Exit 1 was officially named the David B. Sheridan Memorial Interchange.

Tolls along PA 66 were originally collected using a barrier toll system. At the mainline toll plaza, a staffed full-service lane existed, accepting cash or credit cards. For most exit ramp tolls, exact change was required; however some automatic toll collection machines accepted paper money and gave change. All toll collecting machines gave receipts. On October 27, 2019, all-electronic tolling was implemented along the Amos K. Hutchinson Bypass section of PA 66.

== Tolls ==
The Amos K. Hutchinson Bypass portion of the route has tolls. Tolls are collected once during travel on the road, either at the mainline toll barrier, or at the exit or entrance point, depending on the possibility of reaching the mainline toll barrier during travel. No toll is charged for travel between exits 0 and 1 or north of exit 12.

The Amos K. Hutchinson Bypass uses all-electronic tolling, with tolls payable by toll-by-plate (which uses automatic license plate recognition to take a photo of the vehicle's license plate and mail a bill to the vehicle owner) or E-ZPass. As of 2024, the mainline toll barrier between exits 4 and 6 costs passenger vehicles $5.50 using toll-by-plate and $2.90 using E-ZPass. At the northbound exit and southbound entrance at exit 4 and the southbound exit and northbound entrance at exit 6, passenger vehicles are charged $4.70 using toll-by-plate and $1.90 using E-ZPass. The southbound exit and northbound entrance at exits 8 and 9 costs passenger vehicles $3.50 using toll-by-plate and $1.50 using E-ZPass.

== Major intersections ==
County	Location	mi	km	Old exit	New exit	Destinations	Notes
Westmoreland	New Stanton	0.0	0.0			US 119 south – Connellsville	Southern terminus
Westmoreland	New Stanton			1	0	US 119 north to I-70 / I-76 Toll / Penna Turnpike – New Stanton, Greensburg	Southbound exit and northbound entrance; signed as exits 0A (US 119) and 0B (I-70/I-76); access to I-70/I-76 via SR 3091
Westmoreland	New Stanton	1.0	1.6	2	1	Arona Road	David B. Sheridan, P.E. Memorial Interchange; last northbound exit before toll
Westmoreland	Greensburg	4.3	6.9	3	4	PA 136 – West Newton, Greensburg	Tolled northbound exit and southbound entrance
Westmoreland	Greensburg			Hempfield Toll Plaza (E-ZPass or toll-by-plate)			
Westmoreland	Greensburg	6.2	10.0	4	6	US 30 – Irwin, Greensburg	Tolled southbound exit and northbound entrance
Westmoreland	Greensburg	7.7	12.4	5	8	PA 130 – Jeannette, Greensburg	Tolled southbound exit and northbound entrance
Westmoreland	Greensburg	9.3	15.0	6	9	Harrison City, Greensburg	Tolled southbound exit and northbound entrance; access via PA 66 Bus./Brick Hill Road; access to Bushy Run Battlefield
Westmoreland	Delmont	12.5	20.1	7	12	Boquet, Forbes Road	Access via PA 66 Bus.; last southbound exit before toll
Westmoreland	Delmont	12.5	20.1	Northern end of freeway section PA Turnpike 66 becomes PA 66			
Westmoreland	Delmont	13.5	21.7			US 22 – Blairsville, Murrysville	Single-point urban interchange
Westmoreland	Washington Township	19.2	30.9			Mamont Drive to PA 286 – Mamont	
Westmoreland	Washington Township	20.0	32.2			PA 366 west (Greensburg Road) – New Kensington, Lower Burrell	Eastern terminus of PA 366
Westmoreland	Washington Township	23.0	37.0			PA 380 – Sardis, Monroeville, Saltsburg	Interchange
Westmoreland	Washington Township	24.7	39.8			PA 356 north – Freeport	Southern terminus of PA 356
Westmoreland	Washington Township	26.3	42.3			PA 66 Alt. north (Hancock Avenue) – Vandergrift	Southern terminus of PA 66 Alt.
Westmoreland	Washington Township	26.6	42.8			PA 819 south – Salina	Northern terminus of PA 819
Armstrong	Apollo	27.3	43.9			PA 56 east (1st Street) – Shelocta	South end of PA 56 overlap
Armstrong	Parks Township	29.9	48.1			PA 56 west / PA 66 Alt. north (Farragut Avenue / First Street) – Vandergrift, Kittanning	North end of PA 56 overlap
Armstrong	Bethel Township	43.5	70.0			PA 66 Alt. south (Dime Road) – North Vandergrift, Apollo	Northern terminus of PA 66 Alt.
Armstrong	Ford City	49.1	79.0			PA 128 south (5th Avenue) – Ford City, Manorville	Northern terminus of PA 128
Armstrong	Manor Township	50.3	81.0			US 422 west / PA 28 south – Butler, Pittsburgh	Interchange; south end of US 422/PA 28 overlap
Armstrong	Manor Township	52.3	84.2			US 422 east / US 422 Bus. west – Indiana, Kittanning	Interchange; north end of US 422 overlap
Armstrong	Rayburn Township	53.4	85.9			PA 85 east – Rural Valley, Plumville	Western terminus of PA 85
Armstrong	South Bethlehem	70.3	113.1			PA 839 south (Putneyville Road) – Mahoning Lake	Northern terminus of PA 839
Clarion	New Bethlehem	70.7	113.8			PA 28 north (Broad Street) – Brookville	North end of PA 28 overlap
Clarion	New Bethlehem	70.8	113.9			PA 861 west (Penn Street) – Rimersburg	Eastern terminus of PA 861
Clarion	Clarion	83.9	135.0	Southern end of freeway section			
Clarion	Clarion	83.9	135.0	10	64	I-80 east – DuBois	South end of I-80 overlap
Clarion	Monroe Township	86.3	138.9	9	62	PA 68 – Sligo, Clarion	
Clarion	Paint Township	88.0	141.6	8	60	I-80 west – Sharon	North end of I-80 overlap
Clarion	Paint Township	88.0	141.6	Northern end of freeway section			
Clarion	Paint Township	91.8	147.7			US 322 – Shippenville, Franklin, Clarion	
Clarion	Farmington Township	103.3	166.2			PA 36 – Tionesta, Cook Forest	
Forest	Jenks Township	112.7	181.4			PA 899 south – Clarington, Brookville	Northern terminus of PA 899
Elk	Highland Township	128.3	206.5			PA 948 north – Warren	South end of PA 948 overlap
Elk	Highland Township	131.0	210.8			PA 948 south – Ridgway	North end of PA 948 overlap
McKean	Kane	138.9	223.5			US 6 (Fraley Street / Greeves Street) – Warren, Wilcox, Smethport	Northern terminus
1.000 mi = 1.609 km; 1.000 km = 0.621 mi: Concurrency terminus; Electronic toll collection; Incomplete access

== Special routes ==
=== PA 66 Alternate ===
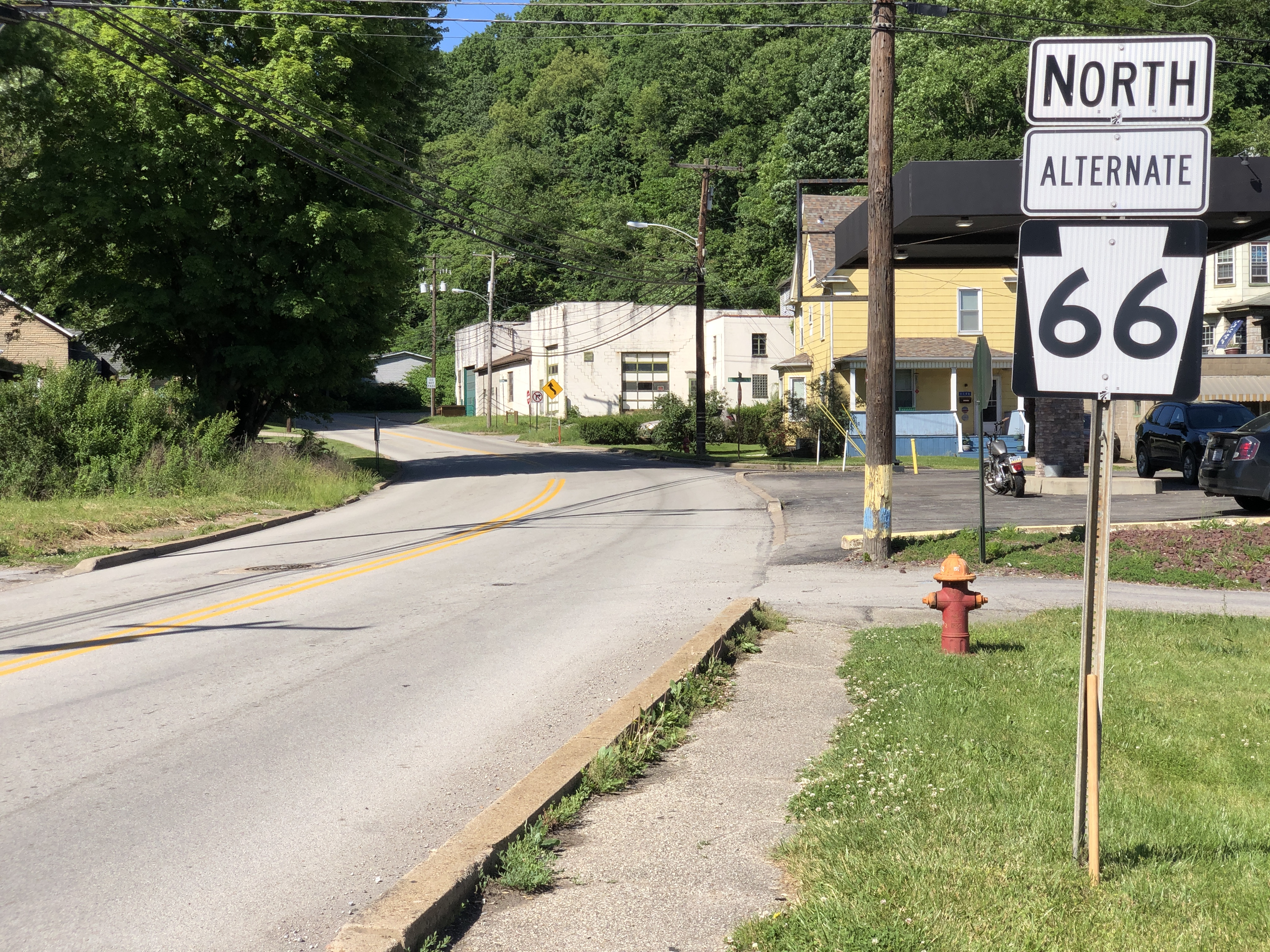
PA 66 Alt. northbound past PA 56 in North Vandergrift

Pennsylvania Route 66 Alternate
- Location: Westmoreland- Armstrong County, Pennsylvania
- Existed: 1938–present

Pennsylvania Route 66 Alternate (PA 66 Alt.) is an 11-mile-long (18 km) alternate route through Westmoreland County and Armstrong County, Pennsylvania.

It leaves its parent route in Washington Township and travels through the center of Oklahoma and Vandergrift, while the mainline route bypasses residential neighborhoods along the riverfront.

PA 66 Alt. merges with PA 56 to cross the Kiskiminetas River. It becomes a separate route again in Parks Township (North Vandergrift), avoiding several riverfront towns as it travels along a hilly, rural stretch, before rejoining mainline PA 66 in Bethel Township.

From 1928 to 1938, the segment from North Vandergrift to the northern terminus was designated as PA 566.

Major intersections

County	Location	mi	km	Destinations	Notes
Westmoreland	Washington Township	0.00	0.00	PA 66 – Apollo, North Washington	Southern terminus of PA 66 Alt.
Westmoreland	Vandergrift	2.98	4.80	PA 56 west (Custer Avenue)	South end of PA 56 overlap
Armstrong	Parks Township	6.46	10.40	PA 56 east / PA 66 (Lincoln Street) – Leechburg, Apollo	North end of PA 56 overlap
Armstrong	Bethel Township	11.37	18.30	PA 66 – Leechburg, Ford City, Kittanning	Northern terminus of PA 66 Alt.
1.000 mi = 1.609 km; 1.000 km = 0.621 mi: Concurrency terminus

=== PA 66 Business ===
Pennsylvania Route 66 Business
- Location: Westmoreland County, Pennsylvania
- Length: 7.743 mi (12.461 km)
- Existed: 1996–present

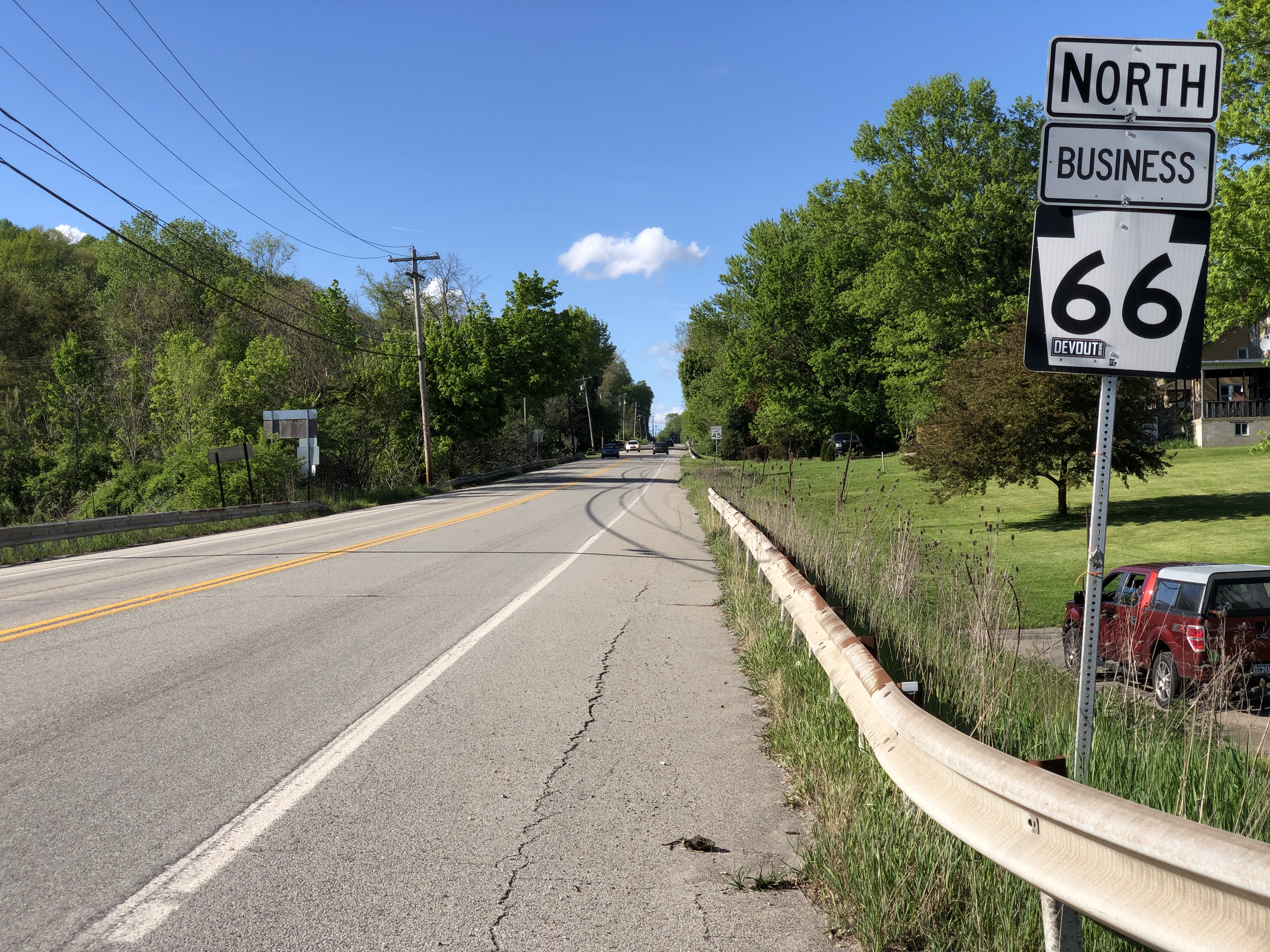
PA 66 Bus. northbound past PA 993 in Hempfield Township

Pennsylvania Route 66 Business (PA 66 Bus.) is an 8-mile-long (13 km) business route in Westmoreland County, Pennsylvania, connected two fingers of suburbia located east of Pittsburgh. The highway was signed PA 66 Business after PA 66 was shifted onto a newly created toll road bypass.

The route begins nearly a mile south of the original terminus of PA 66, at a juncture with US 30 (which loops as a freeway around the city). It is cosigned with US 119 and PA 819 to the city center, before traveling on its own accord through several suburbanized miles.

The route then becomes more rural, as it provides a free connection to the east-central edge of suburban Pittsburgh at Delmont. The highway is designated by PennDOT SR 0119 between US 30 and Pittsburgh Avenue in Greensburg (along the concurrency with US 119), then is part of SR 0066 north of there.

Major intersections
The entire route is in Westmoreland County.

Location	mi	km	Destinations	Notes
Southwest Greensburg	0.000– 0.021	0.000– 0.034	US 30 to PA Turnpike 66 – Pittsburgh US 119 south / PA 819 south (South Main Street) – Youngwood	Interchange; southern terminus of PA 66 Bus.; south end of US 119/PA 819 overlap
Greensburg	1.255	2.020	US 119 north / PA 819 north / PA 130 (Pittsburgh Street) to US 30 – Ligonier	North end of US 119/PA 819 northbound overlap; US 119/PA 130/PA 819 on one-way pair
Greensburg	1.331	2.142	US 119 / PA 130 / PA 819 (Otterman Street)	North end of US 119/PA 819 southbound overlap; south end of PA 130 westbound overlap; US 119/PA 130/PA 819 on one-way pair
Greensburg	1.851	2.979	PA 130 west (Clopper Street)	North end of PA 130 westbound overlap
Hempfield Township	4.815– 4.914	7.749– 7.908	PA Turnpike 66 – New Stanton, Delmont	Exit 9 (PA 66); E-ZPass or toll-by-plate
Hempfield Township	5.960	9.592	PA 993 west (Bushy Run Road) – Harrison City	Eastern terminus of PA 993
Salem Township	7.743	12.461	PA 66 north / PA Turnpike 66 south / Brick Hill Road – Delmont, Greensburg	Exit 12 (PA 66); northern terminus of PA 66 Bus.
1.000 mi = 1.609 km; 1.000 km = 0.621 mi: Concurrency terminus; Electronic toll collection; Route transition
