= Level Green, Pennsylvania =

Unincorporated community in Pennsylvania, US

Coordinates: 40°23′35″N 79°43′14″W

- Census-designated place
- Interactive map of Level Green, Pennsylvania
- Country: United States
- State: Pennsylvania
- County: Westmoreland

Area
  - Total: 3.80 sq mi (9.85 km^{2})
  - Land: 3.80 sq mi (9.85 km^{2})
  - Water: 0 sq mi (0.00 km^{2})

Population (2020)
  - Total: 3,898
  - Density: 1,025.1/sq mi (395.81/km^{2})
- Time zone: UTC-5 (Eastern (EST))
  - Summer (DST): UTC-4 (EDT)
- FIPS code: 42-42912

Level Green is a census-designated place located in Penn Township, Westmoreland County in the state of Pennsylvania, United States. The community is located near Pennsylvania Route 130. As of the 2010 census, the population was 4,020 residents.

== Demographics ==
Historical population
Census	Pop.	Note	%±
2020	3,898		—
U.S. Decennial Census

=== 2020 census ===
As of the 2020 census, Level Green had a population of 3,898. The median age was 48.9 years. 18.1% of residents were under the age of 18 and 24.2% of residents were 65 years of age or older. For every 100 females there were 98.7 males, and for every 100 females age 18 and over there were 95.8 males age 18 and over.

100.0% of residents lived in urban areas, while 0.0% lived in rural areas.

There were 1,538 households in Level Green, of which 25.2% had children under the age of 18 living in them. Of all households, 65.9% were married-couple households, 12.1% were households with a male householder and no spouse or partner present, and 18.5% were households with a female householder and no spouse or partner present. About 20.7% of all households were made up of individuals and 12.3% had someone living alone who was 65 years of age or older.

There were 1,608 housing units, of which 4.4% were vacant. The homeowner vacancy rate was 0.8% and the rental vacancy rate was 9.5%.

Racial composition as of the 2020 census
Race	Number	Percent
White	3,669	94.1%
Black or African American	33	0.8%
American Indian and Alaska Native	0	0.0%
Asian	37	0.9%
Native Hawaiian and Other Pacific Islander	0	0.0%
Some other race	19	0.5%
Two or more races	140	3.6%
Hispanic or Latino (of any race)	45	1.2%
