= Pleasant Unity, Pennsylvania =

Unincorporated community in Pennsylvania, US

- Unincorporated community
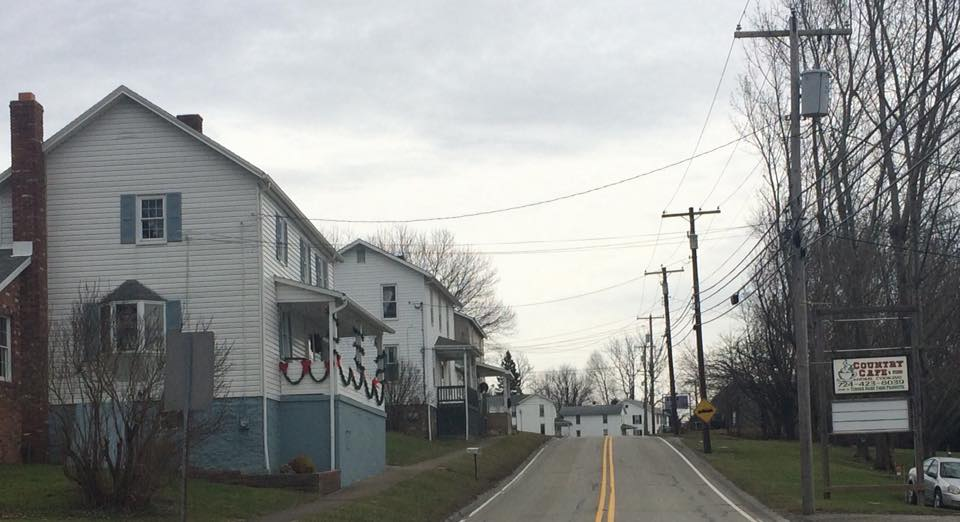
- Pleasant Unity PA, near intersection of Route 981 and Route 130

- Location within Pennsylvania Location within the United States
- Coordinates: 40°14′22″N 79°27′03″W
- Country: United States
- State: Pennsylvania
- County: Westmoreland
- Elevation: 1,083 ft (330 m)
- Time zone: UTC-5 (Eastern (EST))
  - Summer (DST): UTC-4 (EDT)
- ZIP code: 15676
- Area code: 724
- GNIS feature ID: 1184057

Pleasant Unity is an unincorporated community in a rural section of Unity Township, Westmoreland County, Pennsylvania, United States. It is located at the junction of state routes 130 and 981, 6.3 miles (10.1 km) southeast of Greensburg.

Pleasant Unity has a post office, with ZIP code 15676, which opened on November 2, 1825. The area covered by this zip code has a population of 437.

The Jamison Coal and Coke Company operated an underground bituminous coal mine near Pleasant Unity during the period from 1918 through the early 1960s. Known as Jamison No. 20, the mining complex was off Route 981, three miles north of the town. The company store was located on Route 981 at Phillips Street. The mine was served by the Unity Branch of the Pennsylvania Railroad. By 1940, it employed approximately 300 miners.

== See also ==
- Library of Congress. Photos, Prints and Drawings of Pleasant Unity, PA.
- Pennsylvania State University. Pennsvylvania Mine Map Atlas,
