= Battle of Bushy Run =

1763 North American battle

- Part of Pontiac's Rebellion
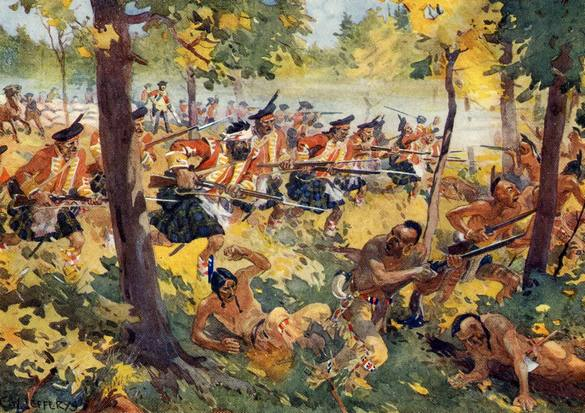
- Highlanders charge at Bushy Run
Date	August 5–6, 1763
Location	near present-day Harrison City, Westmoreland County, Pennsylvania 40°21′20″N 79°37′25″W
Result	British victory

Belligerents
Ohio Country natives	Great Britain

Commanders and leaders
Guyasuta; Keekyuscung †	Henry Bouquet

Strength
110–500	500

Casualties and losses
20–60 killed	42nd Highlanders: Lieutenants John Graham & James McIntosh killed 1 sergeant and 26 rank & file killed Captain John Graham of Duchray & Lieutenant Duncan Campbell wounded 2 sergeants, 2 drummers and 30 rank & file wounded 77th Highlanders: 6 killed 1/60th Royal Americans: 7 killed 8 civilians/volunteers killed Total: 50 killed 36 wounded

The Battle of Bushy Run was fought on August 5–6, 1763, in western Pennsylvania, between a British column under the command of Colonel Henry Bouquet and a combined force of Delaware, Shawnee, Mingo, and Huron warriors. This action occurred during Pontiac's Rebellion. Though the British suffered serious losses, they routed the tribesmen and successfully relieved the garrison of Fort Pitt.

== Battle ==
In July 1763, a relief column of 500 British soldiers, including the 42nd Highlanders, 60th Royal Americans, and 77th Highlanders, left Carlisle, Pennsylvania, to relieve Fort Pitt, then under siege. Indian scouts observed Bouquet's force marching west along Forbes Road and reported this to the Indians surrounding Fort Pitt. On August 5, at about 1:00 pm, a part of the force besieging Fort Pitt ambushed the British column one mile east of Bushy Run Station, at Edge Hill. The British managed to hold their ground until after sunset, when the natives withdrew. Bouquet ordered a redoubt constructed on Edge Hill, and the British placed their wounded and livestock in the center of the perimeter.

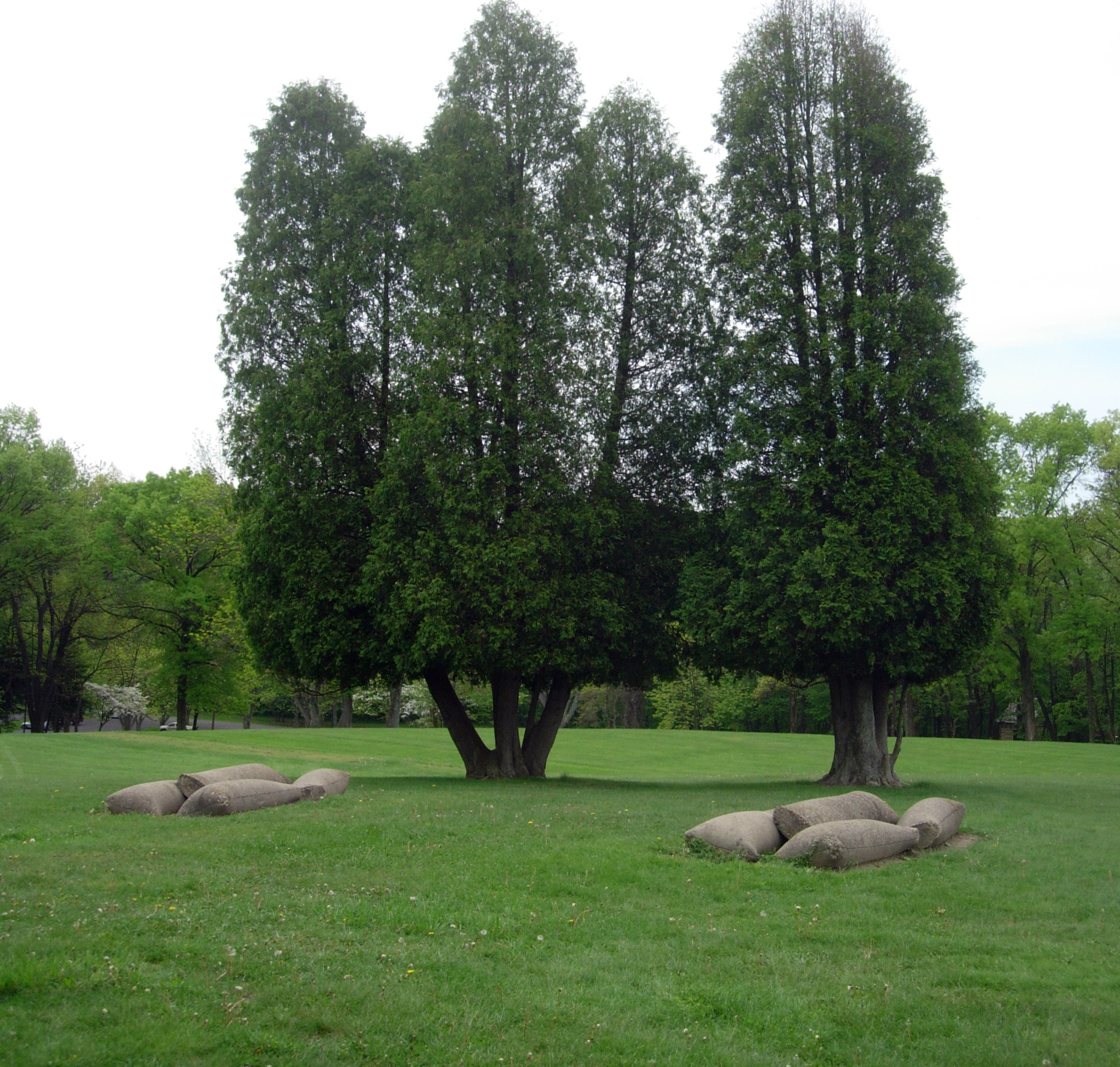
Concrete flour bags at the Bushy Run Battlefield monument on Edge Hill.

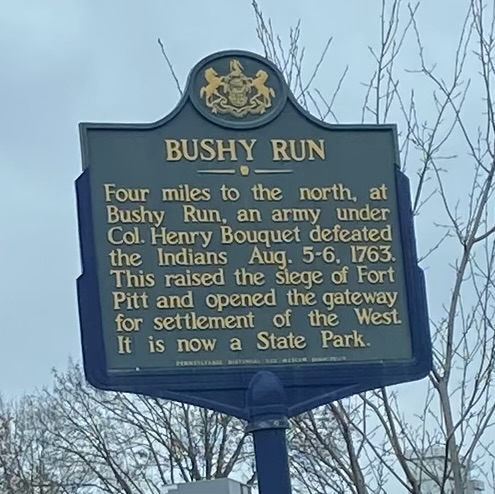
Historical marker, US Route 30, Jeannette PA USA

According to one account, the allied tribes attacked in the morning, but were themselves ambushed by the sentries relieved from their evening duty. With the surprise attack of the sentries, from a flank, and a frontal assault by the main British column, the outnumbered Indians fled in a disorganized retreat.

A second account holds that the warriors attacked in the morning and "redoubled their efforts to break the British line." As the tribesmen became bolder, Bouquet realized the combat was nearing a crisis. Determined to lure his attackers close enough to maim them, the British leader deliberately weakened one section of his line. Spotting the gap in the enemy defenses, the native warriors rushed forward. Instead, the British soldiers fired a volley in their faces and "made terrible havock" with the bayonet. The surviving warriors fled and were unable to rally. This account concurs with that written by Richard Cannon in 1845 in the history of the 42nd Highlanders Regiment in which says that the Colonel of the regiment called in his posts as if about to retreat and the Indians believing that they had victory rushed forward from behind their cover becoming fully exposed. They were then instantly charged in the front and in the flank, by two companies of the 42nd Highlanders, and were thrown into confusion and routed.

Having dispersed its attackers, Bouquet's column headed to Bushy Run, a mile along the Forbes road, where there was badly needed water. The battle has since been attributed to the Bushy Run location, despite the main fighting taking place in Edge Hill. Bouquet then marched to the relief of Fort Pitt.

== Aftermath ==
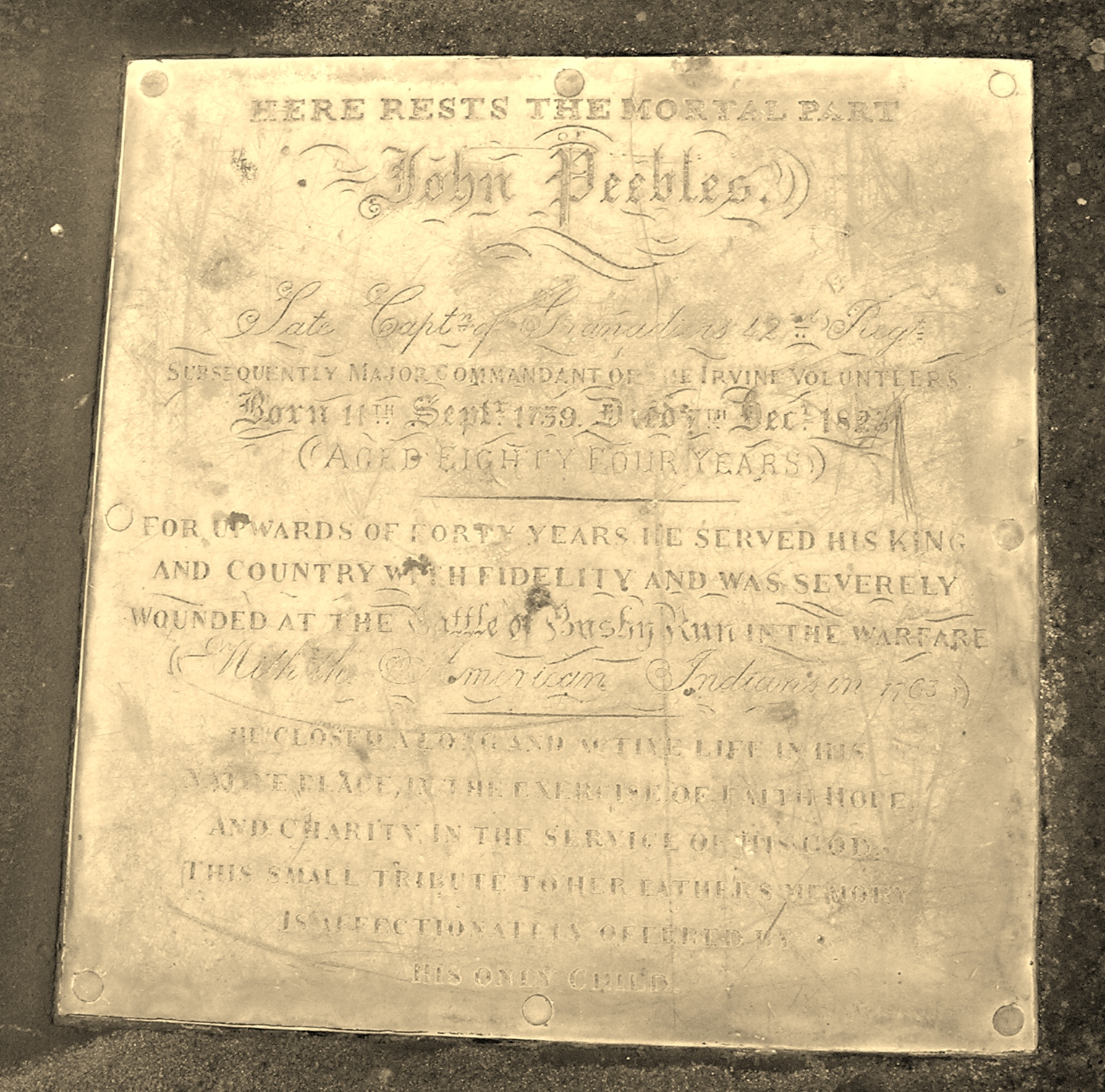
Memorial plaque to John Peebles in the Old Parish Church (Irvine, North Ayrshire) who was wounded at the Battle of Bushy Run.

The battle cost the lives of 50 British soldiers, including 29 of the 42nd Highlanders, seven of the 60th Royal Americans, six of the 77th Highlanders, and eight civilians and volunteers. The confederacy of the Delaware, Shawnee, Mingo, and Huron suffered an unknown number of casualties, including two prominent Delaware chiefs; estimates by contemporaries placed the total Indian loss at about 60. The warrior Killbuck later told Sir William Johnson that only 110 Indians were engaged. Bouquet estimated he fought a number equal to his own force. One contemporary report claimed 20 Indians were killed and many more wounded. The result of the battle inspired in the British "widespread relief on the frontier", since the Indians had finally been defeated on their own ground, prompting one newspaper to exclaim, "that Indians are no more invulnerable than other Men, when attacked on equal Terms, and especially by British Troops."

The site of the battle is now Bushy Run Battlefield Park.
