= Ardara, Pennsylvania =

Unincorporated community in Pennsylvania, US

- Unincorporated community
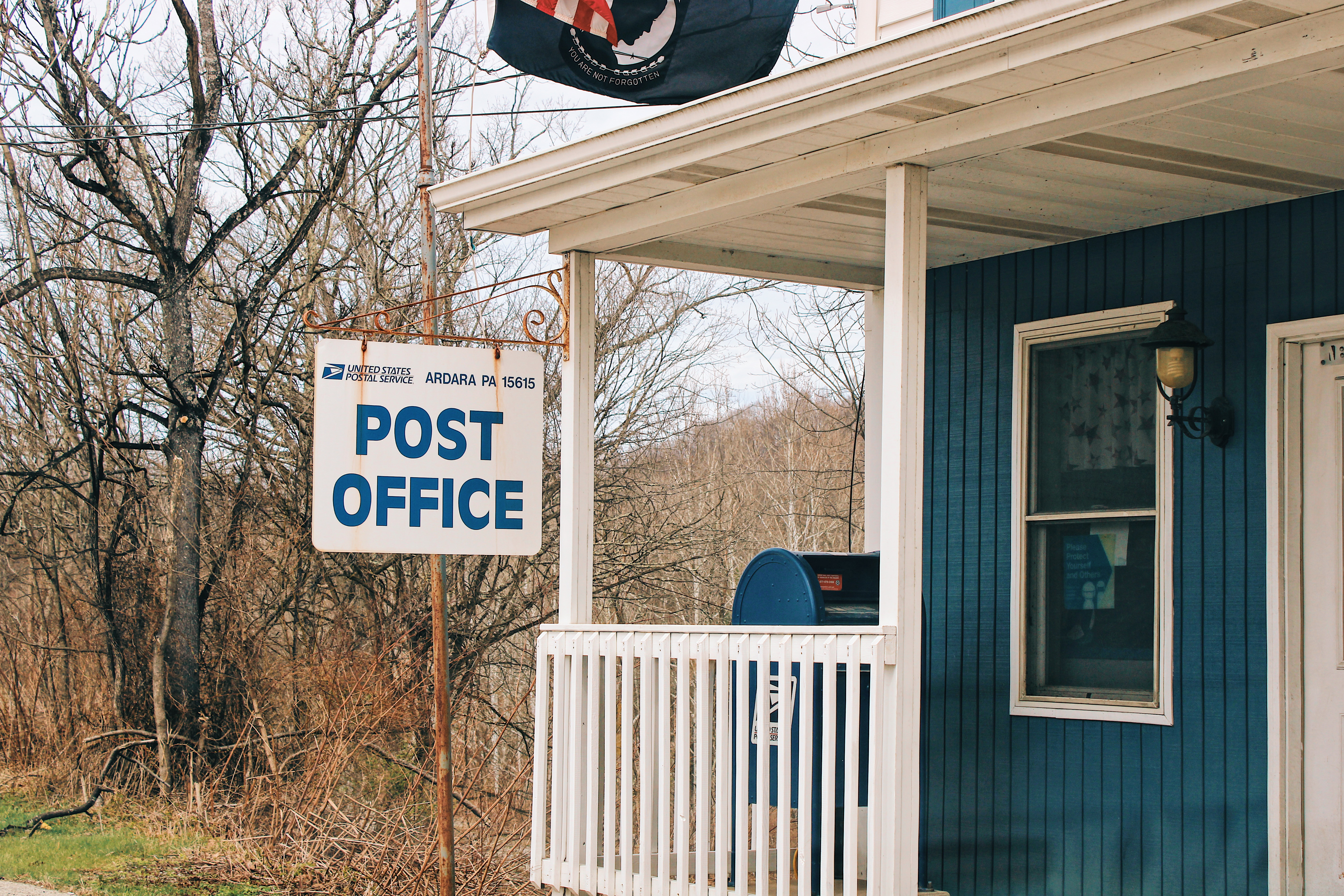
- Ardara post office

- Location within Pennsylvania
- Coordinates: 40°21′28″N 79°44′06″W
- Country: United States
- State: Pennsylvania
- County: Westmoreland
- Elevation: 961 ft (293 m)
- Time zone: UTC-5 (Eastern (EST))
  - Summer (DST): UTC-4 (EDT)
- ZIP code: 15615
- Area codes: 724, 878
- GNIS feature ID: 1168376

Ardara is an unincorporated community in Westmoreland County, Pennsylvania, United States. The community is located along Pennsylvania Route 993, 2.9 miles (4.7 km) northwest of Irwin. Ardara has a post office, with ZIP code 15615, which opened on May 6, 1907.
