= Bushy Run Battlefield =

- U.S. National Register of Historic Places
- U.S. National Historic Landmark
- Pennsylvania state historical marker
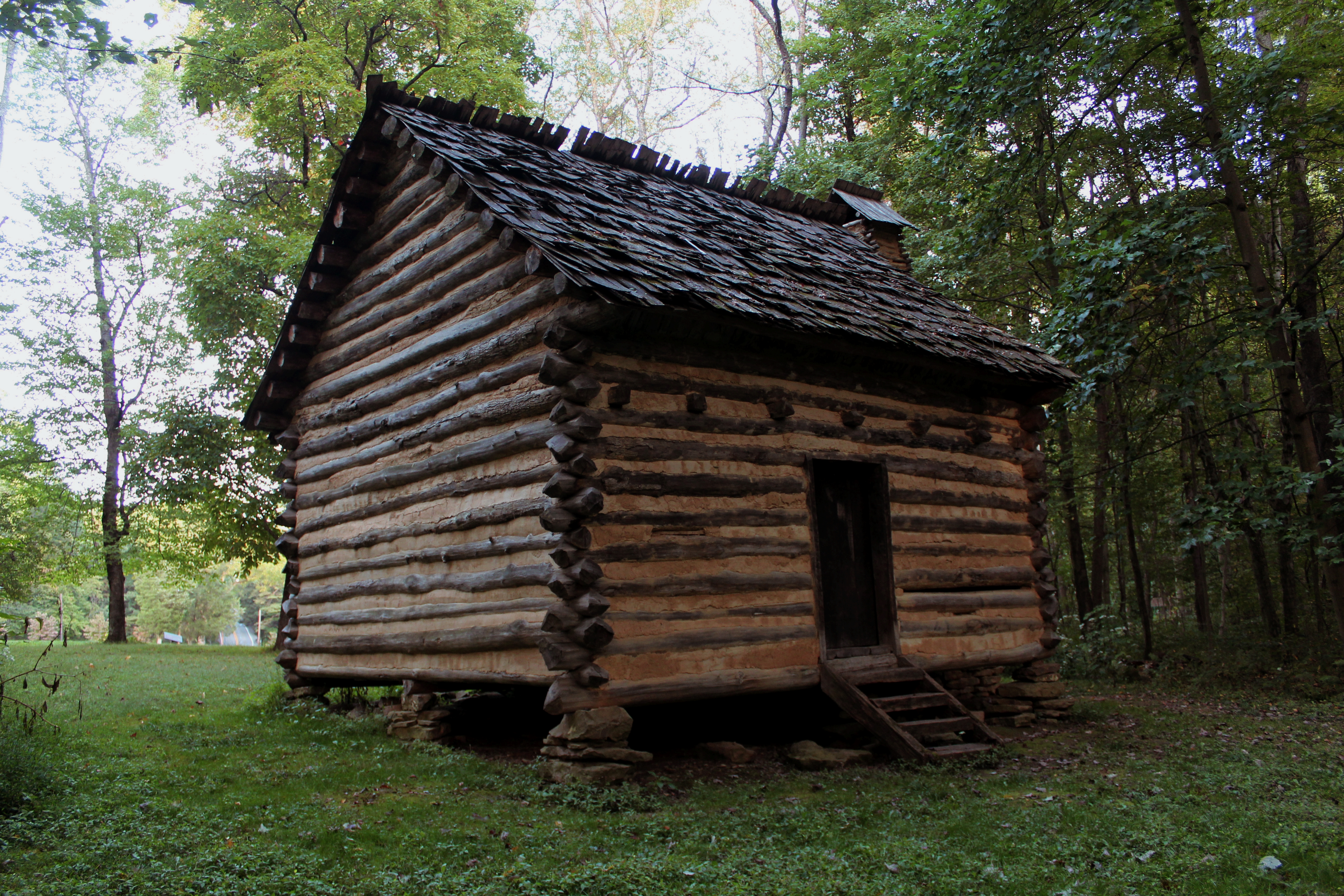
- Backside of cabin, taken 2017.

- Location within Pennsylvania Location within the United States
- Location: Westmoreland County, Pennsylvania, USA
- Nearest city: Harrison City, Pennsylvania
- Coordinates: 40°21′19″N 79°37′12″W
- Area: 218 acres (88 ha)
- NRHP reference No.: 66000696

Significant dates
- Added to NRHP: October 15, 1966
- Designated NHL: October 9, 1960
- Designated PHMC: September 14, 1964

Bushy Run Battlefield Park is a historical park operated by the Pennsylvania Historical and Museum Commission (PHMC) and the Bushy Run Battlefield Heritage Society on 218 acres (88 ha) in Penn Township, Westmoreland County, Pennsylvania in the United States. It was the site of the Battle of Bushy Run fought on August 5–6, 1763 during the Pontiac's Rebellion. The battle was a major victory for the British and enabled them to secure their control of the Ohio River Valley and what was to become the Northwest Territory.

Bushy Run Battlefield Park was established as a Pennsylvania state park in 1927 and declared a National Historic Landmark in 1960. Bushy Run Battlefield Park is the only historic site or museum that deals exclusively with Pontiac's Rebellion and Pennsylvania's only recognized Native American battlefield. The park is located on Pennsylvania Route 993 near Harrison City and Jeannette.

== Battle history ==
The Battle of Bushy Run was fought between a British relief column under the command of Colonel Henry Bouquet and a combined force of Delaware, Shawnee, Mingo, and Huron warriors. In July 1763, a British relief column consisting of 500 British soldiers was sent to relieve Fort Pitt, then under siege. Under the command of Bouquet, the column left Carlisle, Pennsylvania. On August 5, while passing through present-day Westmoreland County, Pennsylvania, the column was ambushed by a large force of Delaware, Shawnee, Mingo, and Huron 25 miles (40 km) east of Fort Pitt. The British managed to hold their ground and, after the natives withdrew after sunset, Bouquet ordered a redoubt, made of sacks of flour, constructed on Edge Hill placing their wounded and livestock in the center of the redoubt.

The following morning, after the evening sentries were being relieved, the allied tribes attacked only to be ambushed themselves by the relieved sentries. As the tribal forces were flanked, the warriors fled in a disorganized retreat. With troops under Bouquet, the column dispersed the attackers before heading to Bushy Run, where there was badly needed water. The battle has since been attributed to Bushy Run despite the main fighting taking place in Edge Hill. Bouquet then marched to the relief of Fort Pitt. The battle was costly with 50 British soldiers killed. The confederacy of the Delaware, Shawnee, Mingo, and Huron also suffered an unknown number of casualties including two prominent Delaware chieftains.

== Park history ==
Bushy Run Battlefield Park was established as a state park in 1927.

In August 2009, the state closed several PHMC museums indefinitely due to a lack of funding as part of an ongoing budget crisis. Bushy Run Battlefield was one of the sites set to be closed. With the help of the Bushy Run Battlefield Heritage Society, the site's volunteer organization, the museum remained open despite budget cuts. On May 5, 2010, the Bushy Run Battlefield Heritage Society came to an agreement with the PHMC to allow the volunteers to staff and operate the museum.

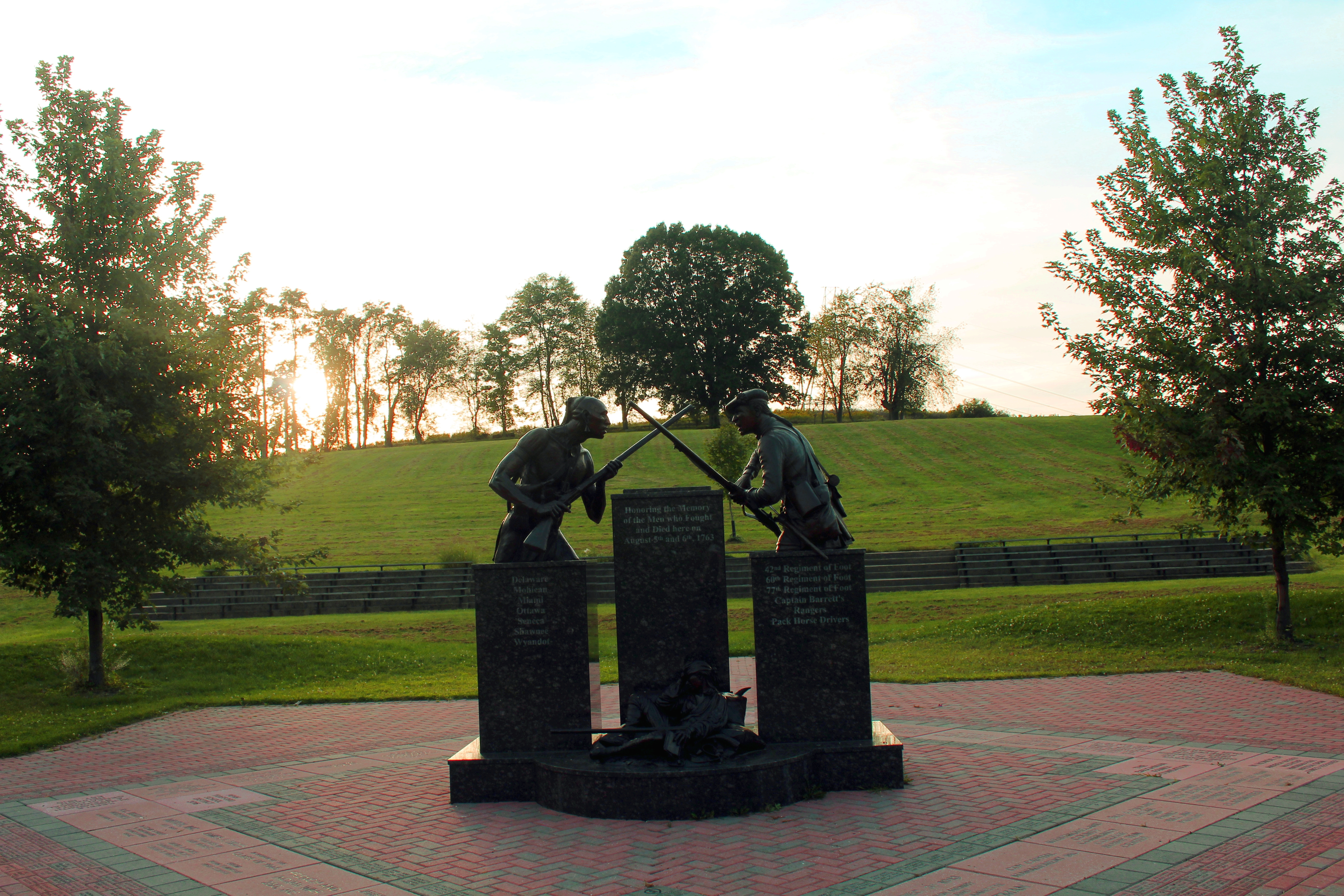
Bronze monument installed in 2013 to commemorate the 250th anniversary of the Battle of Bushy Run.

In 2013, the Bushy Run Battlefield Heritage Society installed a bronze monument at the park to commemorate the 250th anniversary of the Battle of Bushy Run. The monument was created by bronze sculptor Wayne Hyde. Historical artists Robert Griffing and John Buxton designed concepts for the monument. Hyde and Griffing worked together to photograph reenactors for the final design. The location of the bronze monument and surrounding memorial courtyard mark where the first action in battle took place on August 5, 1763.

In May 2024, the park was inducted into the Old-Growth Forest Network for its old-growth trees. The oldest trees on the property are estimated to be 170 and 210 years old. On June 26, 2024, the park sustained damage from an EF1 tornado. While buildings and sections of old-growth forest were spared, many trees came down and caused the park to close for several months for cleanup.

== Recreation ==
=== Visitor Center ===
The Visitor Center is open throughout the year and includes museum exhibits, a theater, and a gift shop.

=== Tours and programs ===
Bushy Run Battlefield Heritage Society offers guided tours of the battlefield, along with educational programs including field trips, day camps, lectures, nature walks, and reenactor demonstrations. Battle reenactments are held annually on the first full weekend of August.

=== Trails and grounds ===
The grounds have several trails through wooded and open landscapes. Wayside exhibits located throughout the park interpret the Battle of Bushy Run. A granite monument on Edge Hill marks the site of Colonel Henry Bouquet's "flour bag fort," where soldiers placed bags of flour to protect themselves and the wounded. Bronze plaques on the stone have quotes from Bouquet's letters about the battle. A bronze monument and memorial courtyard mark the location of the first action in battle on August 5, 1763.

== See also ==
- List of National Historic Landmarks in Pennsylvania
- National Register of Historic Places listings in Westmoreland County, Pennsylvania
