= Penn Township, Westmoreland County, Pennsylvania =

Township in Pennsylvania, US

Coordinates: 40°22′00″N 79°36′59″W

Penn Township
- Township
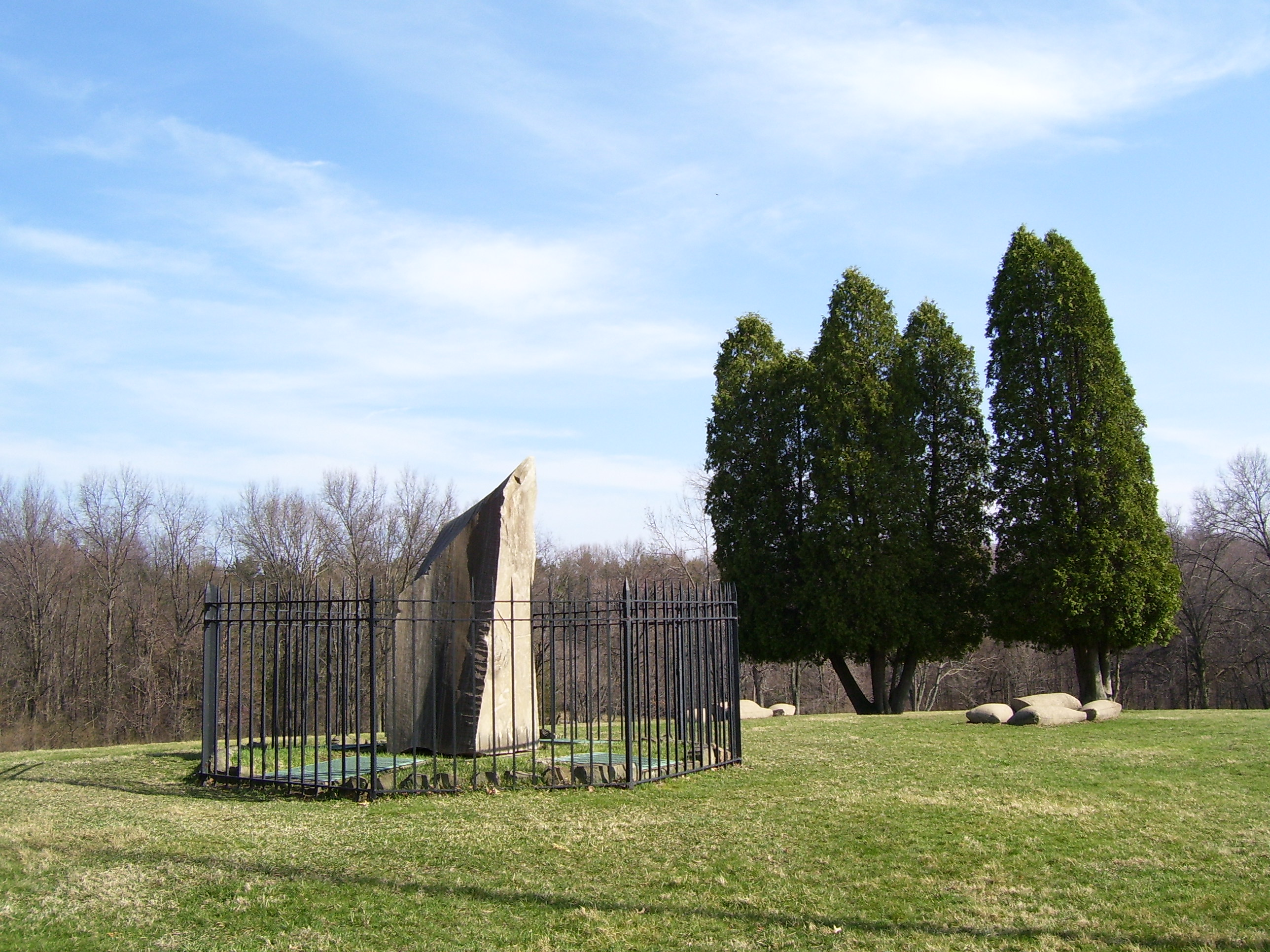
- Monument at the Bushy Run Battlefield

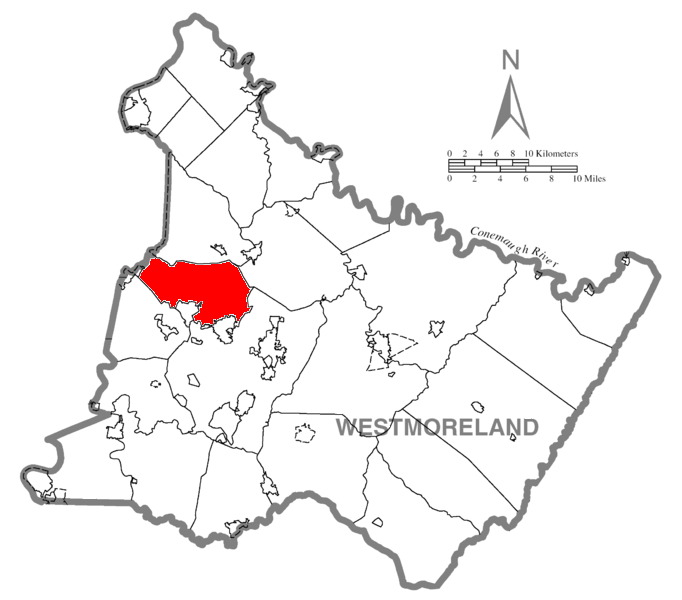
- Map of Westmoreland County, Pennsylvania Highlighting Penn Township

- Map of Pennsylvania highlighting Westmoreland County
- Country: United States
- State: Pennsylvania
- County: Westmoreland
- Incorporated: February 23, 1855

Government
  - Type: Board of commissioners

Area
  - Total: 30.76 sq mi (79.68 km^{2})
  - Land: 30.76 sq mi (79.68 km^{2})
  - Water: 0 sq mi (0.00 km^{2})

Population (2010)
  - Total: 20,047 ▲
  - Estimate (2021): 20,346
  - Density: 636.5/sq mi (245.74/km^{2})
- Time zone: UTC-5 (Eastern (EST))
  - Summer (DST): UTC-4 (EDT)
- FIPS code: 42-129-58880
- Website: https://penntwp.org/

Penn Township is a township in Westmoreland County, Pennsylvania, United States.

== History ==
Penn Township, officially known as the Township of Penn, was named after Pennsylvania founder William Penn. The township was incorporated on February 23, 1855.

In the early years after its founding, numerous Scotch-Irish Americans came to the area to farm its rich land. Later in the township's history, coal mining contributed heavily to the economy.

Penn Township is also home to the Bushy Run Battlefield. The Bushy Run Battlefield was listed on the National Register of Historic Places in 1966, and is designated a National Historic Landmark.

In 1957 Carnegie Mellon University chose the township for a new lab facility.

== Geography ==
Penn Township is located in the western part of Westmoreland County. It is approximately 25 miles east from Pittsburgh and seven miles west of Greensburg. The township is bordered by north by Murrysville, to the northeast by Salem Township, to the east by Hempfield Township, to the southeast by Jeannette, to the southwest by North Huntington Township, to the west-southwest by Trafford, and to the west by Monroeville.

Penn Township maintains nearly 100 miles of roadways. The township has three major transportation routes within its boundaries: Pennsylvania Route 130, Pennsylvania Route 993, and the Pennsylvania Turnpike.

According to the United States Census Bureau, the township has a total area of 30.76 square miles (79.7 km^{2}), all 0 land.

Penn Township is also part of the Turtle Creek (Monongahela River tributary) watershed.

The township contains the census-designated places of Harrison City and Level Green.

== Government ==
Penn Township was incorporated in 1855 and became a First Class township in 1958. The township is governed by five commissioners who are publicly elected and serve a four-year term. Penn Township also has a tax collector elected to serve a four-year term.

Like all First Class Townships, Penn Township has a fully functioning police force.

== Demographics ==
Historical population
Census	Pop.	Note	%±
1940	6,085		—
1950	7,461		22.6%
1960	10,702		43.4%
1970	12,975		21.2%
1980	16,153		24.5%
1990	15,945		−1.3%
2000	19,591		22.9%
2010	20,005		2.1%
2020	20,047		0.2%
2021 (est.)	20,346		1.5%

=== Population ===
As of July 1, 2021, Penn Township has a population of 20,346. This is a 1.5% increase from the 2020 US Census Population.

=== Age and Sex ===
	Penn Township	Pennsylvania	United States
Persons under 5 Years, percent	5.4	5.5	6.1
Persons under 18 Years, percent	20.0	20.7	22.4
Persons 65 Years and over, percent	18.7	18.2	16.0
Female Persons, percent	50.4	51	50.

=== Race ===
	Penn Township	Pennsylvania	United States
White alone, percent	98.0	81.8	76.5
Black or African American alone, percent	0.2	12.0	13.4
American Indian and Alaska Native alone, percent	0.0	0.4	1.3
Asian alone, percent	0.1	3.7	5.9
Native Hawaiian and Other Pacific Islander alone, percent	0.1	0.1	0.2
Two or More Races, percent	1.5	2.1	2.7
Hispanic or Latino, percent	0.7	7.6	18.3
White alone, not Hispanic or Latino, percent	97.6	76.1	60.4

== Education ==
Penn Township is within the Penn-Trafford School District. The district operates eight schools, six of which are in Penn Township:

- McCullough Elementary School
- Level Green Elementary School
- Sunrise Estates Elementary School
- Harrison Park Elementary School
- Penn Middle School
- Penn-Trafford High School

The Murrysville branch of the Westmoreland County Community College is located along Mellon Road.

Penn Township has an overall graduation rate of 96.3% and a bachelor's degree rate of 37.7%
