= Manor, Pennsylvania =

Borough in Pennsylvania, US

- Borough
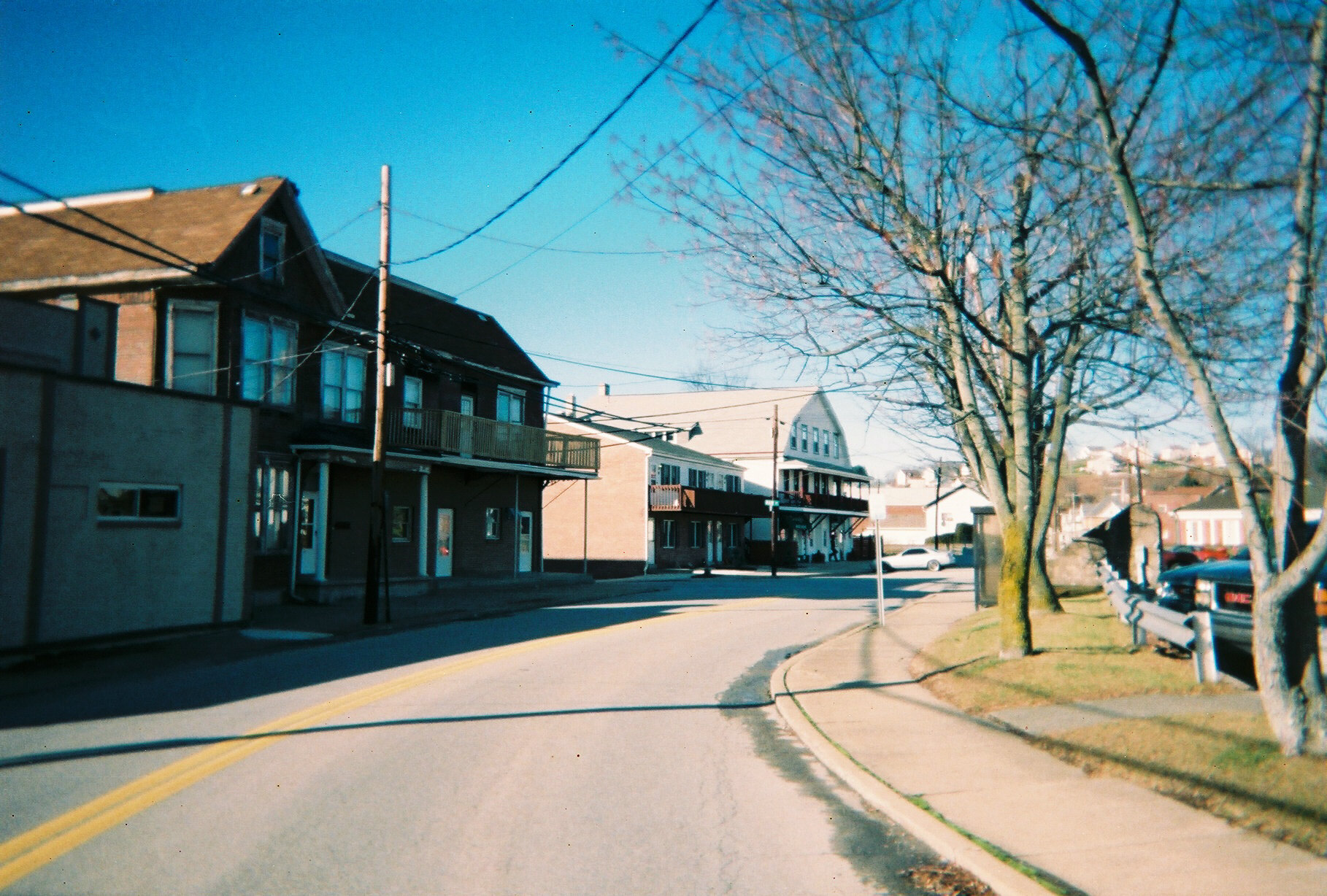
- Manor's business district (Main Street)

- Location of Manor in Westmoreland County, Pennsylvania.

- Location within Pennsylvania Location within the United States
- Coordinates: 40°20′09″N 79°40′06″W
- Country: United States
- State: Pennsylvania
- County: Westmoreland
- Settled: 1873
- Incorporated: 1884

Government
  - Type: Borough Council
  - President: Anthony Gockel
  - Vice President: Dawn Lynn
  - President Pro Tempe: Christine Marchand

Area
  - Total: 1.91 sq mi (4.95 km^{2})
  - Land: 1.91 sq mi (4.95 km^{2})
  - Water: 0 sq mi (0.00 km^{2})
- Elevation: 932 ft (284 m)

Population (2020)
  - Total: 3,585
  - Density: 1,874.2/sq mi (723.62/km^{2})
- Time zone: UTC-5 (Eastern (EST))
  - Summer (DST): UTC-4 (EDT)
- Zip code: 15665
- Area code: 724
- FIPS code: 42-47000
- Website: Official website

Manor is a borough that is located in Westmoreland County, Pennsylvania, United States. The population was 3,585 at the time of the 2020 census.

== History ==
Manor metamorphosed from the original railroad stop, Manor Station, into the borough it is today.

== Geography ==
Manor is located at 40°20′9″N 79°40′6″W (40.335854, -79.668229).

According to the United States Census Bureau, the borough has a total area of 2.0 square miles (5.2 km^{2}), all land.

== Surrounding neighborhoods ==
Manor has three borders, including the townships of Penn from the northwest to the east, Hempfield to the southeast and North Huntingdon from the south to the west.

== Demographics ==
Historical population
Census	Pop.	Note	%±
1890	578		—
1900	684		18.3%
1910	1,039		51.9%
1920	1,077		3.7%
1930	1,305		21.2%
1940	1,289		−1.2%
1950	1,230		−4.6%
1960	1,136		−7.6%
1970	2,276		100.4%
1980	2,235		−1.8%
1990	2,627		17.5%
2000	2,796		6.4%
2010	3,239		15.8%
2020	3,585		10.7%

=== 2020 census ===
As of the 2020 census, Manor had a population of 3,585. The median age was 40.8 years. 24.6% of residents were under the age of 18 and 14.3% of residents were 65 years of age or older. For every 100 females there were 97.3 males, and for every 100 females age 18 and over there were 95.7 males age 18 and over.

100.0% of residents lived in urban areas, while 0.0% lived in rural areas.

There were 1,359 households in Manor, of which 33.8% had children under the age of 18 living in them. Of all households, 62.8% were married-couple households, 12.8% were households with a male householder and no spouse or partner present, and 19.8% were households with a female householder and no spouse or partner present. About 20.7% of all households were made up of individuals and 8.9% had someone living alone who was 65 years of age or older.

There were 1,425 housing units, of which 4.6% were vacant. The homeowner vacancy rate was 1.5% and the rental vacancy rate was 7.2%.

Racial composition as of the 2020 census
Race	Number	Percent
White	3,391	94.6%
Black or African American	18	0.5%
American Indian and Alaska Native	4	0.1%
Asian	31	0.9%
Native Hawaiian and Other Pacific Islander	0	0.0%
Some other race	11	0.3%
Two or more races	130	3.6%
Hispanic or Latino (of any race)	47	1.3%

=== 2000 census ===
As of the census of 2000, there were 2,796 people, 1,001 households, and 784 families living in the borough.

The population density was 1,390.7 inhabitants per square mile (537.0/km^{2}). There were 1,044 housing units at an average density of 519.3 per square mile (200.5/km^{2}).

The racial makeup of the borough was 99.39% White, 0.11% African American, 0.07% Native American, 0.21% Asian, 0.07% from other races, and 0.14% from two or more races. Hispanic or Latino of any race were 0.86% of the population.

There were 1,001 households, out of which 42.1% had children under the age of eighteen living with them; 67.5% were married couples living together, 8.1% had a female householder with no husband present, and 21.6% were non-families. 20.1% of all households were made up of individuals, and 8.9% had someone living alone who was sixty-five years of age or older.

The average household size was 2.73 and the average family size was 3.15.

Within the borough, the population was spread out, with 28.7% of residents who were under the age of eighteen, 5.9% who were aged eighteen to twenty-four, 32.2% who were aged twenty-five to forty-four, 20.1% who were aged forty-five to sixty-four, and 13.2% who were sixty-five years of age or older. The median age was thirty-seven years.

For every one hundred females, there were 96.1 males. For every one hundred females who were aged eighteen or older, there were 90.1 males.

The median income for a household in the borough was $41,266, and the median income for a family was $47,440. Males had a median income of $38,281 compared with that of $26,250 for females.

The per capita income for the borough was $18,118.

Approximately 4.5% of families and 5.4% of the population were living below the poverty line, including 4.7% of those who were under the age of eighteen and 8.1% of those who were aged sixty-five or older.
