= Trafford, Pennsylvania =

Borough in Pennsylvania, US

- Borough
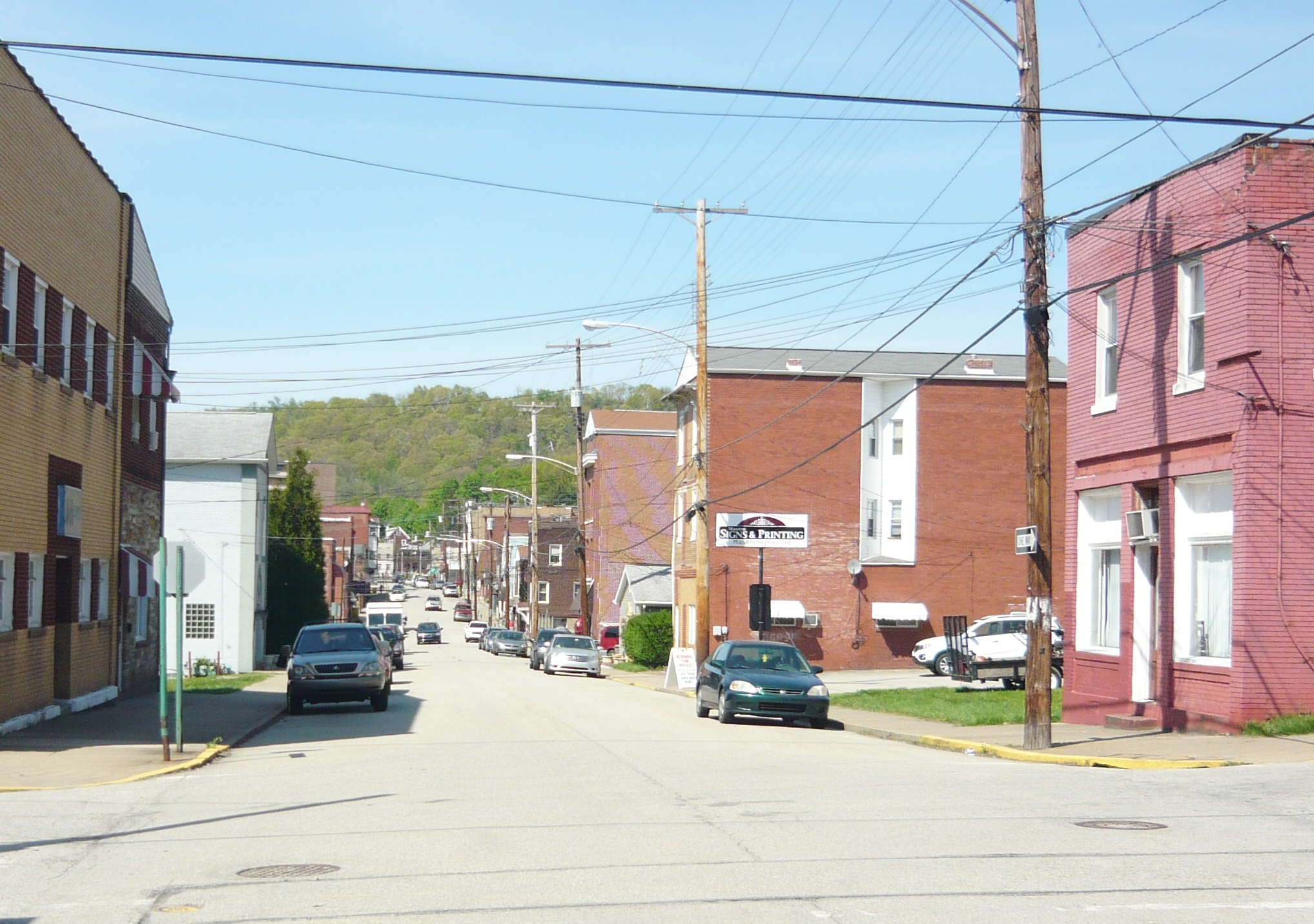
- Cavitt Avenue

- Location in Allegheny County and Westmoreland County in the U.S. state of Pennsylvania.

- Location within Pennsylvania
- Coordinates: 40°23′02″N 79°45′32″W
- Country: United States
- State: Pennsylvania
- Counties: Westmoreland and Allegheny
- Incorporated: August 29, 1904

Government
  - Type: Borough Council
  - Mayor: Edward Llewellyn

Area
  - Total: 1.45 sq mi (3.76 km^{2})
  - Land: 1.45 sq mi (3.76 km^{2})
  - Water: 0 sq mi (0.00 km^{2})
- Elevation: 859 ft (262 m)

Population (2020)
  - Total: 3,317
  - Estimate (2019): 3,039
  - Density: 2,096.0/sq mi (809.26/km^{2})
- Time zone: UTC-5 (Eastern (EST))
  - Summer (DST): UTC-4 (EDT)
- Zip code: 15085
- FIPS code: 42-77272
- Website: www.traffordborough.com

Trafford is a borough in Allegheny and Westmoreland counties in the U.S. state of Pennsylvania. Located near Pittsburgh in western Pennsylvania, the borough lies primarily in Westmoreland County; only a small portion extends into Allegheny County. It was incorporated in 1904 from the northernmost corner of North Huntingdon Township, and was named by George Westinghouse for Trafford near Manchester, England. Westinghouse purchased the land in 1902, and the Trafford Foundry began operations on October 3, 1903. The population was 3,317 at the 2020 census. Of this, 3,113 were in Westmoreland County, and only 61 were in Allegheny County.

== Geography ==
Trafford is located at 40°23′2″N 79°45′32″W (40.383860, -79.758919).

According to the United States Census Bureau, the borough has a total area of 1.4 square miles (3.6 km^{2}), all land.

== Surrounding neighborhoods ==
Trafford has four borders, including Penn Township to the northeast, North Huntingdon from the east-northeast to the south, and the Allegheny County neighborhoods of North Versailles Township to the west and Monroeville to the north.

== Demographics ==
Historical population
| Census | Pop. | Note | %± |
|---|---|---|---|
| 1910 | 1,959 | | — |
| 1920 | 2,859 | | 45.9% |
| 1930 | 4,187 | | 46.4% |
| 1940 | 4,017 | | −4.1% |
| 1950 | 3,965 | | −1.3% |
| 1960 | 4,330 | | 9.2% |
| 1970 | 4,383 | | 1.2% |
| 1980 | 3,682 | | −16.0% |
| 1990 | 3,345 | | −9.2% |
| 2000 | 3,236 | | −3.3% |
| 2010 | 3,174 | | −1.9% |
| 2020 | 3,317 | | 4.5% |

=== 2020 census ===
As of the 2020 census, Trafford had a population of 3,317. The median age was 41.0 years. 21.9% of residents were under the age of 18 and 18.9% of residents were 65 years of age or older. For every 100 females there were 90.2 males, and for every 100 females age 18 and over there were 91.4 males age 18 and over.

100.0% of residents lived in urban areas, while 0.0% lived in rural areas.

There were 1,522 households in Trafford, of which 27.1% had children under the age of 18 living in them. Of all households, 38.6% were married-couple households, 22.1% were households with a male householder and no spouse or partner present, and 32.2% were households with a female householder and no spouse or partner present. About 38.3% of all households were made up of individuals and 15.5% had someone living alone who was 65 years of age or older.

There were 1,679 housing units, of which 9.4% were vacant. The homeowner vacancy rate was 2.8% and the rental vacancy rate was 5.2%.

Racial composition as of the 2020 census
| Race | Number | Percent |
|---|---|---|
| White | 2,976 | 89.7% |
| Black or African American | 96 | 2.9% |
| American Indian and Alaska Native | 4 | 0.1% |
| Asian | 40 | 1.2% |
| Native Hawaiian and Other Pacific Islander | 0 | 0.0% |
| Some other race | 28 | 0.8% |
| Two or more races | 173 | 5.2% |
| Hispanic or Latino (of any race) | 82 | 2.5% |

=== 2000 census ===
As of the 2000 census, there were 3,236 people, 1,526 households, and 900 families living in the borough. The population density was 2,258.6 inhabitants per square mile (872.1/km^{2}). There were 1,631 housing units at an average density of 1,138.4 units per square mile (439.5 units/km^{2}). The racial makeup of the borough was 98.27% White, 0.68% African American, 0.03% Native American, 0.31% Asian, 0.19% from other races, and 0.53% from two or more races. Hispanic or Latino of any race were 0.40% of the population.

There were 1,526 households, out of which 22.5% had children under the age of 18 living with them, 45.1% were married couples living together, 10.7% had a female householder with no husband present, and 41.0% were non-families. 38.0% of all households were made up of individuals, and 20.8% had someone living alone who was 65 years of age or older. The average household size was 2.12 and the average family size was 2.82.

In the borough the population was spread out, with 19.7% under the age of 18, 5.9% from 18 to 24, 27.8% from 25 to 44, 21.6% from 45 to 64, and 25.1% who were 65 years of age or older. The median age was 43 years. For every 100 females there were 86.8 males. For every 100 females age 18 and over, there were 79.8 males.

The median income for a household in the borough was $32,925, and the median income for a family was $40,236. Males had a median income of $36,250 versus $23,409 for females. The per capita income for the borough was $19,487. About 7.4% of families and 11.0% of the population were below the poverty line, including 16.3% of those under age 18 and 11.0% of those age 65 or over.

== Trivia ==
- Parts of the movie Kingpin were filmed in Trafford.
- Trafford City Alumni sandlot football team was the first team to play the newly renamed Pittsburgh Steelers, in an exhibition game on August 28, 1940. (Prior to 1940, the Pittsburgh football team went by the name "Pirates".)

== Government and politics ==
Presidential Elections Results
| Year | Republican | Democratic | Third Parties |
|---|---|---|---|
| 2024 | 60% 1,089 | 39% 710 | 1% 21 |
| 2020 | 56% 27 | 41% 20 | 2% 1 |
| 2016 | 60% 967 | 34% 547 | 6% 95 |
| 2012 | 58% 859 | 41% 601 | 1% 20 |
