= Harrison City, Pennsylvania =

Unincorporated community in Pennsylvania, US

- Census-designated place
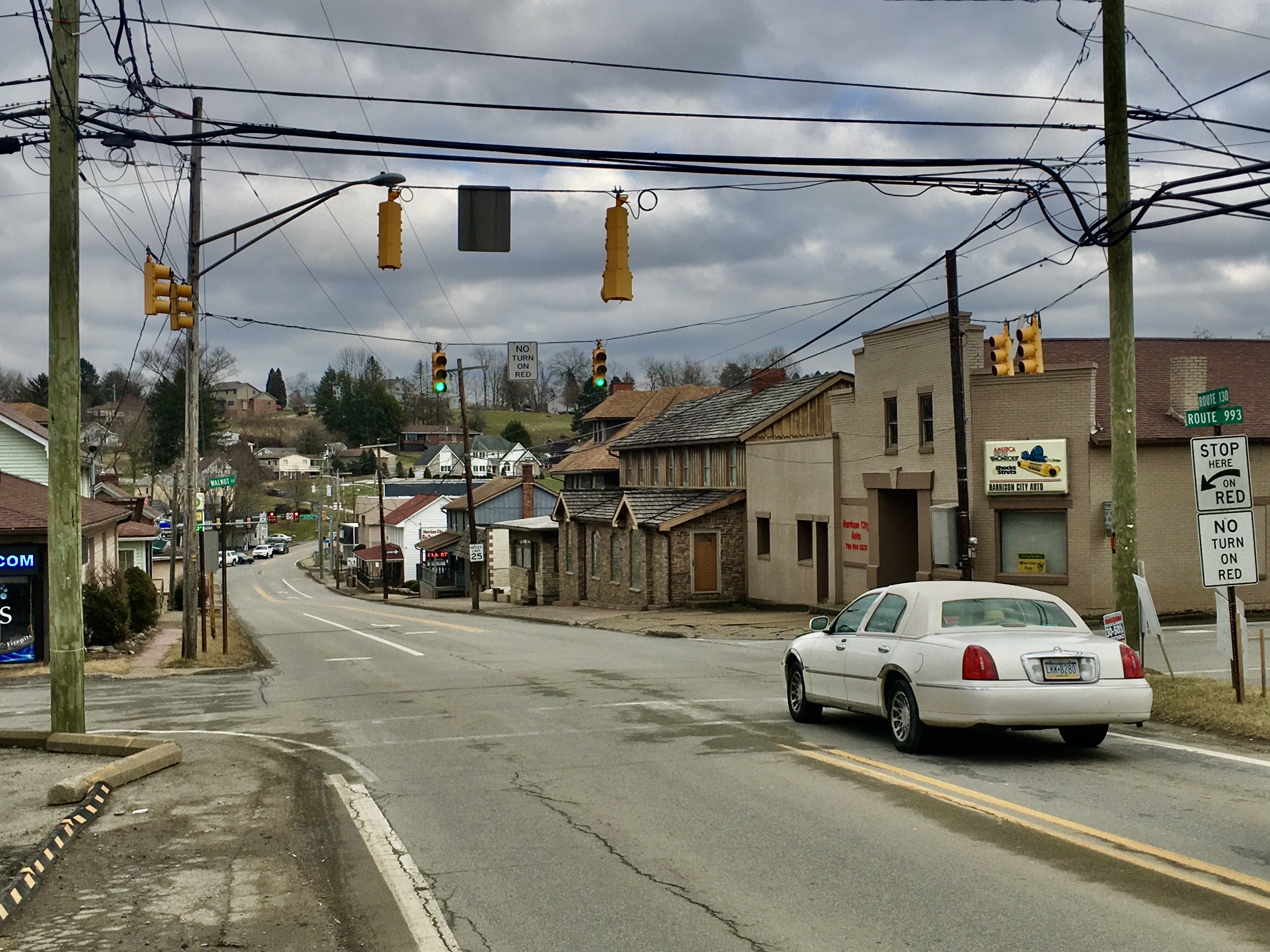
- State Route 130 in Harrison City, February 2021

- Location of Harrison City in Pennsylvania Harrison City, Pennsylvania (the United States)
- Coordinates: 40°21′17″N 79°39′1″W
- Country: United States
- State: Pennsylvania
- County: Westmoreland
- Township: Penn
- Elevation: 991 ft (302 m)
- Time zone: UTC-5 (EST)
  - Summer (DST): UTC-4 (EDT)
- ZIP code: 15636
- Area code: Area code 724

Harrison City is a census-designated place (CDP) in Westmoreland County, Pennsylvania, United States. The population was 174 at the 2020 census.

== Geography ==
Harrison City is located at 40°21′17″N 79°39′1″W (40.3548, -79.6502).

According to the United States Census Bureau, the CDP has a total area of 0.1 square miles (0.26 km^{2}), all land.

== Demographics ==
As of the census of 2000, there were 155 people, 75 households, and 42 families living in the CDP. The population density was 3,029.1 inhabitants per square mile (1,169.5/km^{2}). There were 81 housing units at an average density of 1,582.9 per square mile (611.2/km^{2}). The racial makeup of the CDP was 97.42% White, 1.94% African American, and 0.65% from two or more races. Hispanic or Latino of any race were 1.29% of the population.

There were 75 households, out of which 26.7% had children under the age of 18 living with them, 38.7% were married couples living together, 16.0% had a female householder with no husband present, and 44.0% were non-families. 44.0% of all households were made up of individuals, and 21.3% had someone living alone who was 65 years of age or older. The average household size was 2.07 and the average family size was 2.88.

In the CDP, the population was spread out, with 20.0% under the age of 18, 6.5% from 18 to 24, 23.2% from 25 to 44, 26.5% from 45 to 64, and 23.9% who were 65 years of age or older. The median age was 45 years. For every 100 females, there were 82.4 males. For every 100 females age 18 and over, there were 85.1 males.

The median income for a household in the CDP was $35,179, and the median income for a family was $36,250. Males had a median income of $28,542 versus $16,250 for females. The per capita income for the CDP was $14,759. None of the population or families were below the poverty line.

== Facts ==
Harrison City is near the site of the Battle of Bushy Run. Penn-Trafford High School is in Harrison City, and the CDP is served by the Penn-Trafford School District. Harrison City is named after former United States President Benjamin Harrison.
