= Pennsylvania House of Representatives, District 57 =

American legislative district

Pennsylvania's 57th State House of Representatives district
Representative
Eric Nelson; R–Hempfield Township, Westmoreland County
- Population (2022): 66,577

The 57th Pennsylvania House of Representatives District is located in southwest Pennsylvania and has been represented by Eric Nelson since 2016.

== District profile ==
The 57th District is located in Westmoreland County and includes the following areas:

- Adamsburg
- Arona
- Greensburg
- Hempfield Township
- New Stanton
- South Greensburg
- Southwest Greensburg
- Youngwood

== Representatives ==
Representative	Party	Years	District home	Note
Prior to 1969, seats were apportioned by county.
Amos K. Hutchinson	Democrat	1969 – 1988		
Thomas Tangretti	Democrat	1989 – 2008	Hempfield Township	Retired
Tim Krieger	Republican	2009 – 2015	Hempfield Township	Retired following election to the Westmoreland County Court of Common Pleas
Eric Nelson	Republican	2016 – present	Hempfield Township	Incumbent

== Recent election results ==
PA House election, 2024: Pennsylvania House, District 57
Party	Candidate	Votes	%
Republican	Eric Nelson (incumbent)	Unopposed	
Total votes		29,981	100.00
Republican hold			

PA House election, 2022: Pennsylvania House, District 57
Party	Candidate	Votes	%
Republican	Eric Nelson (incumbent)	Unopposed	
Total votes		21,811	100.00
Republican hold			

PA House election, 2020: Pennsylvania House, District 57
Party	Candidate	Votes	%
Republican	Eric Nelson (incumbent)	Unopposed	
Total votes		28,797	100.00
Republican hold			

PA House election, 2018: Pennsylvania House, District 57
Party	Candidate	Votes	%
Republican	Eric Nelson (incumbent)	16,057	62.82
Democratic	Collin Warren	9,504	37.18
Total votes		25,561	100.00
Republican hold			

PA House election, 2016: Pennsylvania House, District 57
Party	Candidate	Votes	%
Republican	Eric Nelson (incumbent)	20,396	65.15
Democratic	Linda Iezzi	10,909	34.85
Total votes		31,305	100.00
Republican hold			

PA House special election, 2016: Pennsylvania House, District 57
Party	Candidate	Votes	%
Republican	Eric Nelson	4,589	65.97
Democratic	Linda Iezzi	2,367	34.03
Total votes		6,956	100.00
Republican hold			
