= Greater Greensburg Sewage Authority =

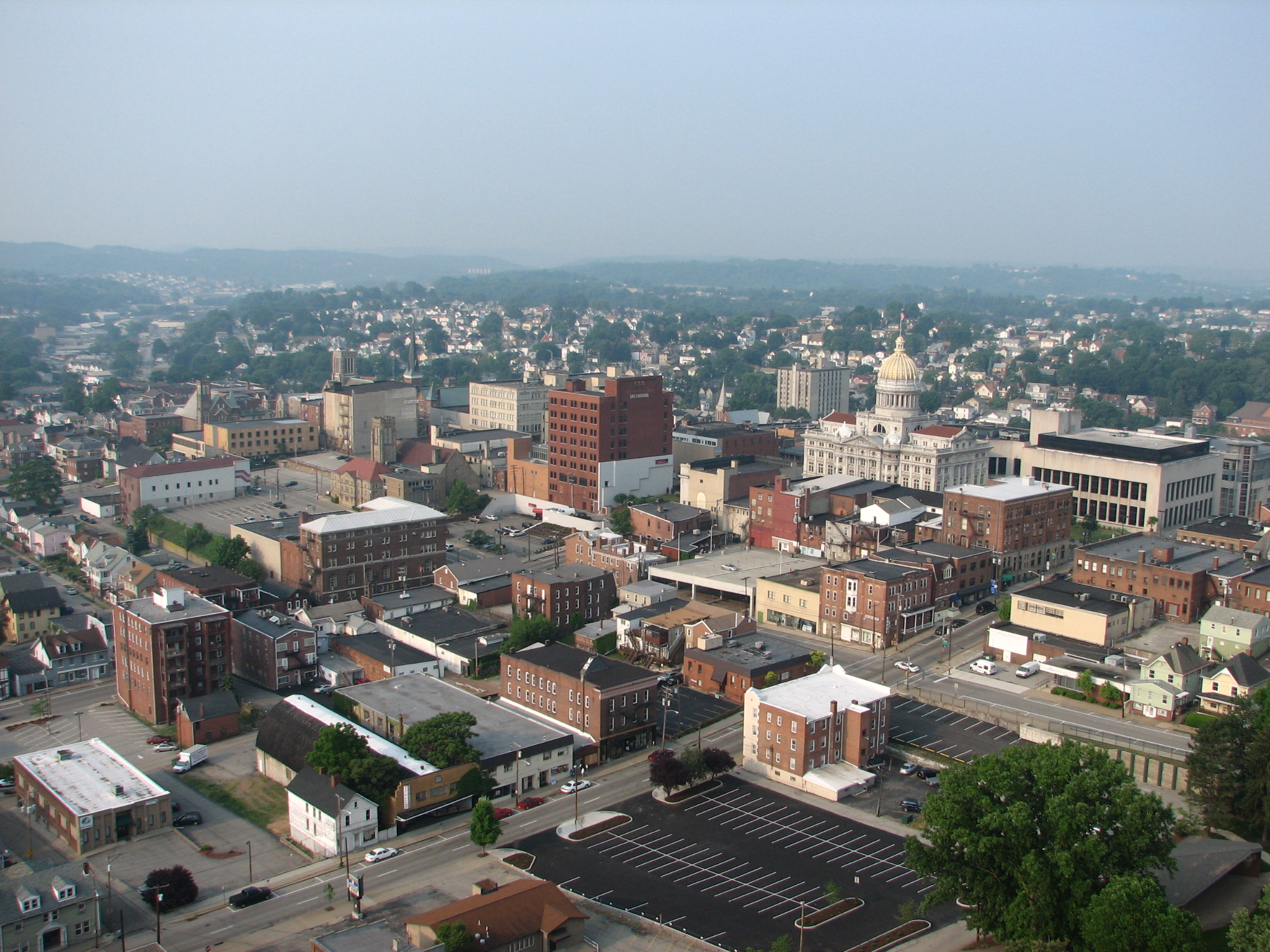
- Downtown Greensburg, 2007

Municipal Authority overview
- Headquarters: 210 W. Otterman St. Greensburg, Pennsylvania 15601
- Website: https://ggsa.us/

The Greater Greensburg Sewage Authority is a publicly operated municipal authority that treats sewage from households and businesses throughout of the city of Greensburg, the boroughs of South Greensburg and Southwest Greensburg, and portions of Hempfield Township, all located in central Westmoreland County, Pennsylvania.

It was established in January 1957.

== History and service statistics ==
Established in January 1957, the Greater Greensburg Sewer Authority received approval from the Pennsylvania Department of Health and its Sanitary Water Board in December 1958 to add an intercepting sewer to its operations system.

In March 1962, the Pennsylvania Sanitary Water Board initially denied permission to the Greater Greensburg Sewer Authority to extend its sewer system to provide services to the new Greensburg Salem High School and the city's Lynch Field swimming pool, which were both under construction at that time. The state based that determination on the sewer authority's "lack of satisfactory progress toward compliance with the [state's] original order to construct [a new] treatment plant." By the end of that year, newspapers were reporting that state mandates had increased the cost of the new school's sewer line construction from $189,000 to $243,000.

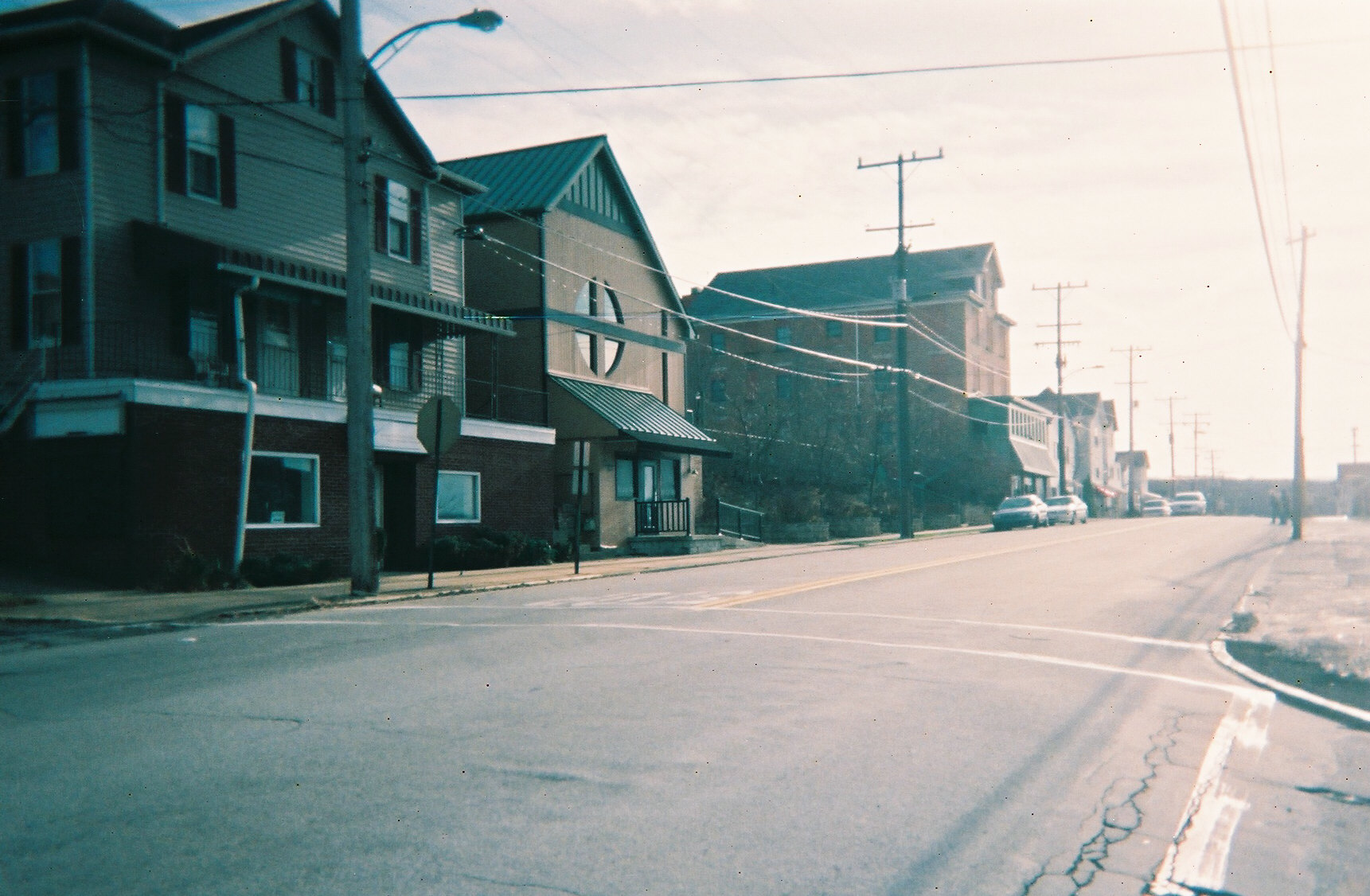
South Greensburg's business district, 2008

During the summer of 1962, sewage authority leaders proposed a $5,180,000 bond issue that would support the construction of a sewage disposal system for the communities of Greensburg, South Greensburg and Southwest Greensburg. Construction costs were estimated at $4,504,523 with $207,000 proposed for engineering costs and $100,000 estimated for the purchase of land, right of way damages, and other related legal fees, and $334,726 estimated for fees associated with the release and maintenance of the bond. The bond was expected to be paid for by water users in the three communities at the rate of one hundred and thirty-two percent of their respective water bills. The Series A bonds issued during that period were called for redemption on October 1, 1986 with all outstanding bonds maturing on or after August 1, 1987. At a meeting in late July of that year, sewage authority board members met with local borough officials to define the service fees that would be charged by the authority to customers, by municipality, for their water consumption, the powers to be given to the sewage authority to operate its various components, including the authority's responsibility for billing and charging consumers, and other operational procedures.

In 1963 and 1965, the sewage authority received challenges to its rate structure from, respectively, Hempfield Township officials who felt the $500 charge for new, individual, residential sewer tap-ins was too high, and from the mayor of Greensburg who was pushing for a five percent reduction in rates for his borough's residents. In August 1965, the Southwest Greensburg Council approved a seventeen percent rate reduction for its residents to bring their bills in line with those of residents from other cities served by the sewage authority.

In August 1966, the Greater Greensburg Sewage Authority received a $71,017 state grant in support of the Clean Streams Act. It had been deemed eligible for a total of $3,550,858 in funding.

In November 1968, the sewer authority received $68,000 from the Pennsylvania Department of Health and its Sanitary Water Board to support the operation and maintenance of its sewage treatment facilities as part of a $1,510,843.29 award made to the Allegheny County Sanitary Authority. In December 1969, the sewer authority received an additional $68,325.50 for that same purpose.

=== 1970s ===
During the early 1970s, Hempfield Township was sued by private real estate developers for failure to issue building permits for a low-cost housing project that was already underway. The township had stopped issuing those permits when executives of the Greater Greensburg Sewage Authority realized that their system would be unable to handle the increased load that would be generated by the addition of the new residential properties and ceased issuing permits for new sewer tap-ins.

=== 1980s ===
In 1980, environmental regulators of the Commonwealth of Pennsylvania denied permission to the Greater Greensburg Sewage Authority to create new sewer tap-ins and new building permits for contractors planning to build new apartments in the community of Greensburg because the sewage authority's system would be unable to process the water flow issues and sewage that were expected to be generated by those proposed apartments.

Less than two years later, the sewage authority was forced to take its sewage treatment plant out of service in January 1982 when a waterline break dumped more than one-and-a-half-million gallons of water into the basement where the plant's solid waste-processing equipment was held. Plant repairs, which were approved by state environmental regulators, involved the subsequent dumping of more than four million gallons of raw sewage into Jack's Run near Route 119 while the plant remained out of service. Following roughly $280,000 in repairs, the plant was placed back into operation in early February.

The multi-year, tap-in hold subsequently continued, with builders being denied permits or delayed by the city's planning department, an impasse which finally ended in 1983 when state regulators ceased their tap ban and authorized the sewage authority's 1984 addition of two hundred and sixty new sewer taps, one hundred and thirty-four of which were slated for the community of Greensburg, with the communities of Hempfield, Southwest Greensburg, and South Greensburg receiving ninety, twelve, and nine new taps, respectively, and the authority itself receiving twenty-one. Four hundred additional new tap-ins were then authorized by the state in late 1985 to enable the sewage authority to link interceptor sewers at new residential and commercial properties to the authority's treatment plant.

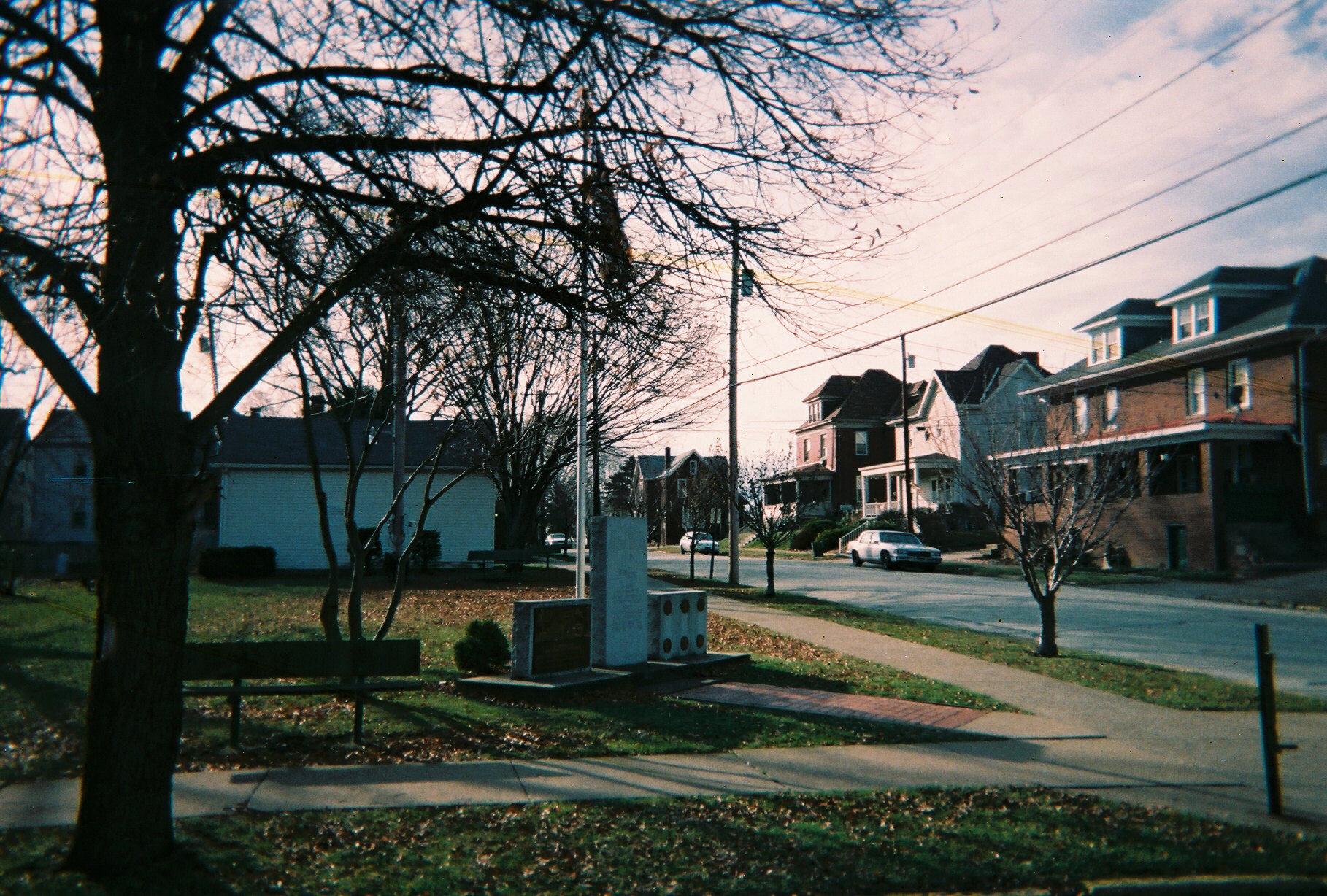
Borough Park, Southwest Greensburg, 2008

On June 11, 1987, sewage authority board members approved a thirty-three percent rate hike for customers in Greensburg, South Greensburg, Southwest Greensburg, and parts of Hempfield Township in order to help reach new sewer system updates mandated by state environmental regulators.

In October 1988, the Environmental Protection Agency awarded a $4,791,540 grant to the Greater Greensburg Sewage Authority for use in making major improvements to sewer lines in the communities it served and in upgrading its sewage treatment plant on Route 119. $780,000 of that grant was dedicated to repairing Hempfield Township sewer lines. Pennsylvania's Office of the Governor also approved an additional $81,600 to enable the sewage authority to install new sewers at Zeller's Run.

In 1989, the sanitary sewer rate charged to customers by the Greater Greensburg Sewer Authority was one hundred and sixty percent of each customer's total water usage, whether that water entered the GGSA sewer system or not. In December of that year, the Pennsylvania Infrastructure Investment Authority, also known as Pennvest, approved a $5.1 million loan to the sewage authority to support its $11.3 million plan to upgrade its sewage treatment plant on Route 119 in order to bring it into compliance with recent federal mandates.

=== 1990s ===
On February 23, 1990, sewage authority executives broke ground on a planned eleven-million-dollar expansion of the authority's sewage treatment plant on Route 119 in South Greensburg. Expected to be completed by the end of 1991, it was designed to increase the plant's capacity in order to meet tighter state and federal environmental regulations.

=== Recent capital improvements ===
Greater Greensburg Sewage Authority has invested more than $15 million in capital improvements to the treatment plant and sewer system over the past twenty years, including expanding the plant from its former capacity of 2.5 million gallons a day to its current capacity, and separating storm and sanitary sewer lines per the Stormwater Management Act No. 174. Future projects include increasing the treatment plant's size to 9.2 million gallons per day capacity. Presently, GGSA is working on equalizing combined sewer overflows (CSO's) at the treatment plant.

The treatment plant, located off of Route 119 in Hempfield Township, currently serves 9,800 customers and treats 6.75 million gallons of wastewater daily into Jack's Run.

== Board of directors ==
GGSA has a 7-member board of directors, which the bylaws include three persons from the City of Greensburg, two from South Greensburg Borough, and two from Southwest Greensburg Borough. There are the following positions on the BOD, including:

- Chairman
- Vice Chairman
- 2nd Vice Chairman
- Secretary
- Assistant Secretary
- Treasurer
- Assistant Treasurer

There is also a consulting engineer and a solicitor that make up the BOD as well.

== Controversies ==
During the early 1970s, Hempfield Township officials repeatedly took legal action against the Greater Greensburg Sewage Authority for dumping sludge from the authority's sewage treatment processes at various township locations in violation of the township's solid waste disposal ordinances. In June 1970, Hempfield Township threatened legal action against the authority for dumping liquid sludge in the township's White's Hill section. Residents expressed concerns that the sludge was being dumped near an environmentally important and sensitive watershed and also had the potential to contaminate underground water in the area. In early February 1971, township officials filed legal charges against the authority and two individuals accused of dumping sludge without a permit on Stone Church Road near Armbrust. In May 1972, the sewage authority won its appeal to the Pennsylvania Commonwealth Court that it be allowed to "deposit sludge on farm property owned by Wayne H. Hillis of Armbrust R.D. 1," an application which had initially been denied by Hempfield Township supervisors in January 1970.

In 1982, conflict of interest charges were alleged against three board members of the Greater Greensburg Sewage Authority by a fourth member, Ruth W. Love (1903-1985), who questioned dual roles held by William Lakin, James E. Smith and James Roman, Jr., all three of whom were members of the Utility Workers of America (Local 487 and 164), which was the contract bargaining agent for eleven employees at the authority's sewage treatment plant. Smith and Roman were also employees of the sewage authority and also, respectively, members of the borough councils of Southwest Greensburg and South Greensburg, while Lakin also represented South Greensburg on the sewer authority's board. Earlier that year, the sewage authority had been forced to close its treatment plant after a waterline break severely damaged the plant's solid-waste processing equipment, resulting in the dumping of millions of gallons of raw sewage into Jack's Run near Route 119. In early November of that same year, sewage rates were reduced by the sewage authority by ten percent for Greensburg residents.

In 1985, the Pennsylvania Department of Environmental Protection (then the Pennsylvania Department of Environmental Resources) prohibited the Greater Greensburg Sewage Authority from creating any new connections to the communities it serviced. Newspapers reported that the prohibition resulted from the failure of GGSA to make sufficient progress correcting system problems, its failure to submit proper annual management reports and to enlarge the treatment plant," which was "operating at capacity" at that point.

In April 1986, residents of Greensburg increased pressure on executives of the sewage authority to fix flooding problems they were having in their basements due to a small stream which overflowed its banks repeatedly. Residents, who said they had been assured by Pennsylvania House of Representatives member Amos Hutchinson that $350,000 had been allocated from the state for use by the Greater Greensburg Sewage Authority to create a new storm sewer, were angry at city officials who claimed that the state had not yet provided the money for the construction. Residents pointed out that sewage authority personnel could at least attempt to alleviate their flooding problems by cleaning the creek of debris while waiting for the state to follow through with the promised storm sewer funding. A year later, representatives from the sewage authority participated in a town hall session sponsored by state environmental regulatory agencies for municipal authorities and water agencies to facilitate discussion regarding infrastructure needs across the Commonwealth of Pennsylvania and about the problems caused by unfunded state and federal infrastructure upgrade mandates for city and county governments.

In 1988, a rate increase of one hundred percent took effect on October 1 for 8,400 customers of the Greater Greensburg Sewage Authority, an increase which doubled the cost of residents' average sewer bills from $34.09 to $68.18 per quarter. The increase was expected to cover the costs of ten-and-a-half-million dollars in sewer line upgrades and sewage treatment plant improvements to bring the plant into compliance with federal regulations. The rate increase followed a previous year's increase that raised rates from sixty to eighty percent of water consumption to repair existing sewer lines and pay for new equipment. A year later, in November 1989, Greensburg city council tabled a proposed ordinance to extend the Greater Greensburg Sewage Authority's term to the year 2025 in order for council members to have time to investigate consumer complaints about water rates and determine if the authority's term, which was slated to expire in 1990, could be renewed for a shorter period.

Although executives of the Greater Greensburg Sewer Authority applied for an $8,000,000 grant from the United States government in February 1988 to enable upgrading of the authority's sewer treatment plant to bring it into compliance with new ammonia nitrogen pollution limits that were scheduled to take effect under the Clean Water Act of the United States on July 1 of that year, treatment plant operators were ultimately unable to meet those tighter restrictions. As a result, the sewer authority was fined $160,000 by the federal government in May 1991, and continued to face additional fines if its sewage treatment plant was not brought into compliance before the end of that year, even though it had already begun construction of a new plant, which was slated to be completed by December 15, 1991.
