= Greengate Centre =

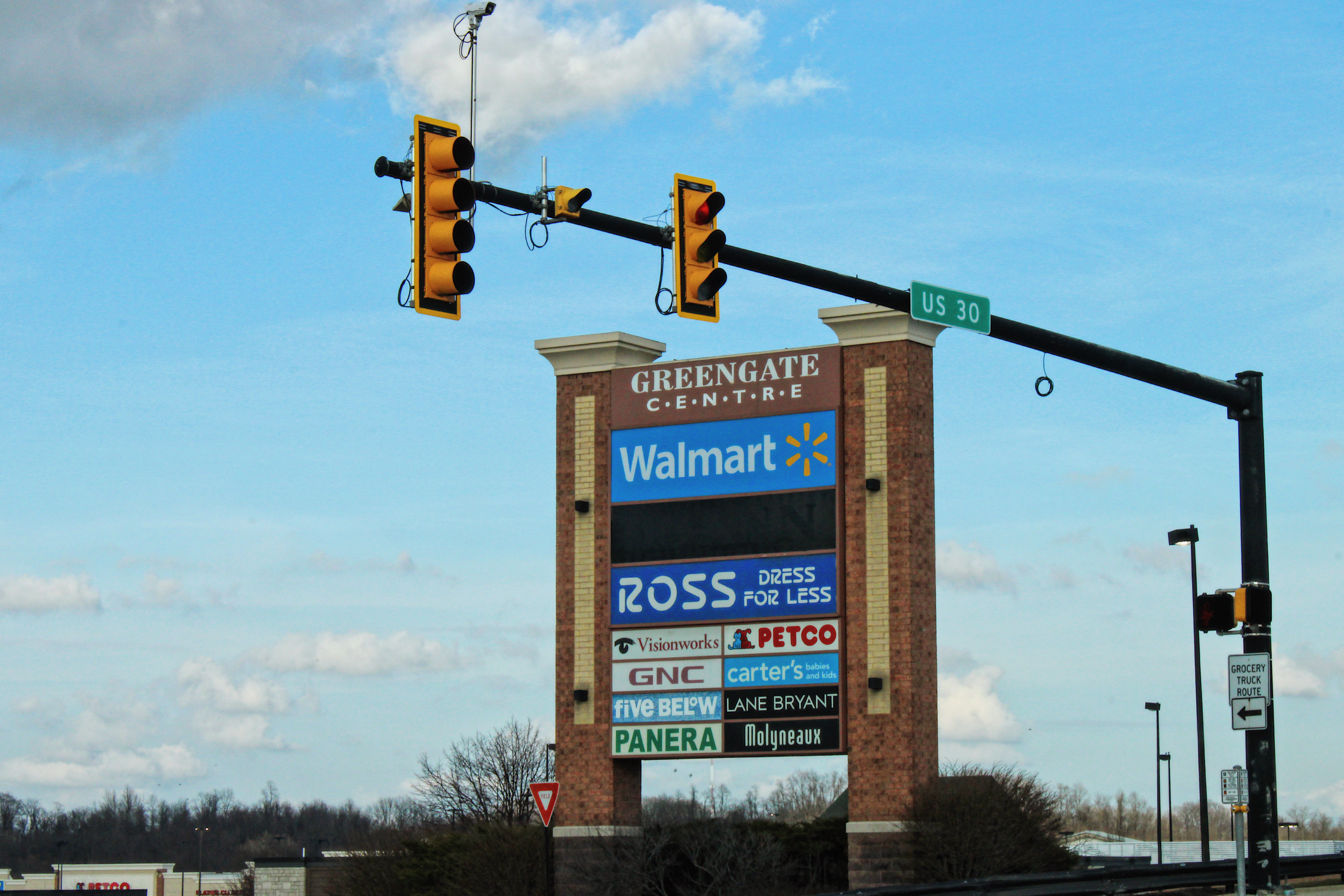
- Sign for Greengate Centre in 2026
- Location: Hempfield, Pennsylvania, United States
- Coordinates: 40.30585°N 79.58236°W
- Opened: 2005
- Developer: THF Realty
- Manager: The Kroenke Group
- Owner: The Kroenke Group
- Num. of stores: 45+
- Num. of anchor tenants: 4
- Floor area: 430,000 square feet (40,000 m^{2})
- Floors: 1 (open-air)
- Parking: 2,000+

Greengate Centre is an open-air power center in Hempfield Township, Pennsylvania, United States. It is located on U.S. Route 30. The center opened in 2005 on the site of the defunct Greengate Mall, which was demolished in 2003. Greengate Centre currently encompasses over 430,000 square feet (40,000 m^{2}) of retail space, and more than 45 stores and restaurants. Anchor stores include Petco, Ross Dress for Less, and Walmart. It also contains dozens of smaller retailers such as Five Below, GameStop, Lane Bryant, General Nutrition Centers, Oshkosh B'gosh, and Verizon Wireless. The Kroenke Group of Columbia, Missouri owns and manages the shopping center.

== Greengate Centre East ==
Greengate Centre East is a 71,576-square-foot (6,649.6 m^{2}) strip shopping center adjacent to Greengate Centre. It was built in the early 1980s. It was originally anchored by a Giant Eagle supermarket, which moved less than a mile west to the Hempfield Square development in 1997. Currently, Greengate Centre East is anchored by a Big Lots discount store and features a Wines & Spirits liquor store, M&M Leather, Play It Again Sports, and Once Upon A Child. Sonic Drive-In opened for business in March 2009 on the former site of Rax restaurant.

== Greengate North Plaza ==
Greengate North Plaza is an ancillary office and retail building at Greengate Centre. It sits on the bottom of the hill behind the Wal-Mart Supercenter and was once part of the Greengate Mall complex. It was built in 1977 and was anchored by a General Cinema triple-screen movie theater, later to become part of Carmike Cinemas. It closed in 1999 when the larger Carmike 15 multiplex opened at Westmoreland Mall, five miles (8 km) east. Today, tenants include a branch of First Commonwealth Bank, La Bliss bridal boutique, and a travel agency. Heartland Hospice and a number of chiropractic, physical therapy, and medical offices also reside in the building.

== Greengate Mall ==
Greengate Mall
- Location: Greensburg, Pennsylvania, U.S.
- Coordinates: 40.30585°N 79.58236°W
- Address: U.S. Route 30
- Opened: August 18, 1965; 61 years ago
- Closed: 2001; 25 years ago (redeveloped into Greengate Centre)
- Demolished: May 2003–August 2003
- Developer: Community Research & Development, Inc.
- Manager: THF Realty
- Owner: THF Realty
- Num. of stores: 100+ (at peak)
- Num. of anchor tenants: 3 (at peak)
- Floor area: 651,000 square feet (60,500 m^{2})
- Floors: 2
- Parking: 3,270 spaces

Greengate Mall was developed by The Rouse Company in 1965 as an enclosed shopping mall. It was the third shopping mall in Greater Pittsburgh to be built as a fully enclosed structure, after Northway Mall, now The Block Northway, and South Hills Village.

=== History ===
Original anchor stores included Horne's, J.C. Penney, and Montgomery Ward. Other major tenants included a G. C. Murphy dime store, various eateries such as Burger King, Hot Sam Pretzels, and Elby's Big Boy (which used to be a Sweet William's), and specialty retailers including New York & Company, Herrold Jewelers, Waldenbooks, The Gap, RadioShack, Foot Locker, KB Toys, and Spencer Gifts. The mall was also home to local FM radio station WSSZ "Z107" (now WHJB) and the first mall-based off-track betting center.

Sears and Kaufmann's, two department store chains, had both expressed interest in opening a store at Greengate Mall since the mall's opening in the 1960s. Rouse, however, did not want to spend additional money to build additional anchor spaces at Greengate Mall. As a result, Westmoreland Mall opened across town in 1977, with Sears and Kaufmann's (turned Macy's) as its original anchor stores, joined later by The Bon-Ton and, from Greengate itself, J.C. Penney.

J.C. Penney's departure to Westmoreland Mall in 1994 left a large vacancy at Greengate that, along with competition from a nearby Walmart and the aforementioned mall, caused it to decline. The Joseph Horne Company was acquired by Lazarus in 1994, and the Horne's store at Greengate Mall was among those converted to the Lazarus name. Lazarus closed two years later, however, and the mall was sold to new owners in August 1998 for $1.6 million.

In 2001, Montgomery Ward closed with the chain's bankruptcy; shortly afterward, an attempt was made to convert the largely vacant mall to a telecommunications center. This plan failed, and the last of the mall's tenants were evicted in the summer of 2001. Greengate Mall remained vacant until 2003, when THF Realty acquired the property. The mall was demolished for Greengate Centre, which opened in 2005.

Today, the defunct mall has become a product of nostalgia, spawning such mediums as a website, a Facebook group with a large following, and even a book titled The Malling of America: Travels in the United States of Shopping by William Severini Kowinski. In addition, the mall was featured in the Helene Klodawsky film Malls R Us.
