= Mary Gregory =

American artist

- Born: 1856; Providence, Rhode Island
- Died: May 24, 1908 (aged 51–52)
- Known for: Art Glass

Examples of Mary Gregory work

Mary Gregory (1856 – May 24, 1908) was an American artist known for her decoration of glass products at the Boston and Sandwich Glass Company in Cape Cod, Massachusetts. Gregory worked for Boston and Sandwich from 1880 to 1884. Gregory painted lamps and plaques of landscape scenes during her years at B&SGC.

== Early life and work ==
Gregory was born in Providence, Rhode Island to John Gregory and Hannah A. Gregory. Her mother was a school teacher in Sandwich, Massachusetts and Mary worked as a teacher as well from 1876 to 1879, but soon abandoned teaching to work for the Boston and Sandwich Glass Company as a glass decorator, beginning in January 1880.

== Victorian children ==
She was particularly well known for her paintings of Victorian-era children, and such artwork has been referred to as Mary Gregory since the 1920s. The glass most likely came from Bohemia, England, or Italy. Despite this, many glass art enthusiasts continue to refer to such pieces as Mary Gregory.

== The "Mary Gregory" style ==
Glassware in the style of Mary Gregory continued after her tenure at the Boston and Sandwich glass factory from 1880 to 1884.

Angela M. Bowey in The Glass Encyclopedia describes the distinguishing features of Mary Gregory glass as "stylised white enamel painting usually of a child in an outdoor setting, playing with such things as butterfly nets, bubbles, fishing rods, or hoops. The trees and foliage often have a typical "feathered" style, the figure is oddly old-fashioned in its proportions, and the enamel is fired onto the glass."

The Westmoreland Glass Company of Grapeville, Pennsylvania began marketing their glasswork as Mary Gregory in the 1920s. They would create glass paintings of Victorian Era children in profile, and say it was done in the style of Mary Gregory. Westmoreland artists painted the cherubic white silhouettes on black milk glass plates, vases, glass boxes, heart-shaped plates, et cetera. In the 1970s, they also painted these scenes on blanks that they called Blue Mist – a semi-opaque glass with a baby blue tint to it. Many pieces of Mary Gregory's work also show up as Cranberry plates, goblets, glasses, etc.

== Technique ==
Gregory, her sister, and possibly others she had trained, used a white enamel paint with ground glass as a paint mixture. To bind the paint to the glass, they fired it after application. It was fused with the piece in this manner so the painting became part of the glass. Similar artwork was made by literally dozens of glass houses, and some, such as Fenton, continue to this day.

== See also ==
- Cranberry glass
