= Eric Nelson (Pennsylvania politician) =

American politician (born 1968)

Member of the Pennsylvania House of Representatives from the 57th district
- Incumbent
- Assumed office April 5, 2016
- Preceded by: Tim Krieger

Personal details
- Born: December 19, 1968 (age 57) Hempfield Township, Pennsylvania, U.S.
- Party: Independent(before 2015) Republican(2015-present)
- Spouse: Susan
- Children: Brooke, Randy, Liberty, Will, Kennedy and Gretchen
- Education: Indiana University of Pennsylvania
- Occupation: Safety professional/professor

Eric Nelson is a member of the Pennsylvania House of Representatives, representing the 57th House district in Westmoreland County, Pennsylvania.

== Early life ==
Nelson served as a Marine and a faculty member at Indiana University of Pennsylvania. He owned a family beef farm and is married with six children. Prior to 2015, Nelson was registered as an Independent, but he changed his political affiliation to Republican that year.

== Political career ==
Nelson became the representative for the 57th House District of Pennsylvania during a special election in March 2016, taking over the seat after Rep. Tim Krieger resigned to serve as a common pleas court judge. He won a full term in November 2016 with sixty-five percent of the vote over opponent Linda Iezzi.

In November 2018, Nelson was elected to a second term, receiving sixty-two percent of the vote over his opponent Collin Warren.

In April 2020, Nelson introduced an amendment to the Heart and Lung Act that would ensure police and firefighters would continue to be paid if they had to miss work because of the COVID-19 pandemic. The bill was signed into law by Governor Tom Wolf.

After the 2020 presidential election, Nelson was one of twenty-six Pennsylvania House Republicans who called for withdrawing certification of presidential electors, despite there being no conclusive evidence of fraud, and despite Joe Biden winning Pennsylvania by more than 80,000 votes. This also occurred after federal appeals brought by the Trump campaign were dismissed due to lack of evidence.

=== Committee assignments ===
- Consumer Affairs
- Insurance
- Labor & Industry, Subcommittee on Workers Compensation and Worker Protection - chair
- State Government
