= Thomas Tangretti =

American politician

Thomas A. Tangretti

Member of the Pennsylvania House of Representatives from the 57th district
- In office January 3, 1989 – November 24, 2008
- Preceded by: Amos K. Hutchinson
- Succeeded by: Tim Krieger

Personal details
- Born: September 20, 1946 (age 80) Pittsburgh, Pennsylvania
- Party: Democratic
- Spouse: Sandra L. Tangretti
- Education: Indiana University of Pennsylvania; University of Pittsburgh
- Website: Official website

Thomas A. "Tom" Tangretti (born September 20, 1946) is a Democratic member of the Pennsylvania House of Representatives for the 57th District and was elected in 1988. He retired prior to the 2008 election and was succeeded by Republican Tim Krieger.

== Personal life ==
Tangretti graduated from Jeannette High School (1964), Indiana University of Pennsylvania (B.A., 1968) and the University of Pittsburgh (MPA, 1974).

He and his wife, Sandra, live in Hempfield Township, Pennsylvania.
