= Live! Casino & Hotel (disambiguation) =

Live! Casino & Hotel is a casino hotel in Hanover, Anne Arundel County, Maryland, United States, adjacent to Arundel Mills Mall. It is owned, operated and was developed by The Cordish Companies.

Live! Casino & Hotel may also refer to:

- Live! Casino & Hotel Philadelphia
- Live! Casino Pittsburgh
