= Glass animal collectibles =

Collectible tiny blown glass animal figurines

Glass animal collectibles are tiny blown glass animal figurines that serve as collectibles. It takes skill to make each one, with each figurine having a unique color and form. Making glass animals requires a torch kit, a kiln, glass, and rods.

== History ==
Making glass animals likely began early in the history of glassblowing, as the ancient Syrians who invented the process often incorporated animals in their culture's artistic themes. Ancient glassworkers would make vessels, vases, and eating utensils. Animals were often used in ornamentation on glass artworks, but the exact origin of glass animal figurines is unknown.

In the 1860s, carousel figurines spread to the United States. Gustav Dentzel started a company that made the parts. He used the acid-cutting method to create his pieces. Glassblowing was introduced to shape the glass.

During the late 19th-century, cameo glass became a popular form of Art Nouveau glassmaking inspired by Roman cameo carvings. Glass vases of the time were decorated by adding molten colored glass in the shape of flora and fauna and carefully carved or etched to achieve a specific design. Some of these artists, particularly those in Bohemia, began making glass animal figurines as collectibles, which were sold to hobbyists in Europe and North America. Some popular glass animal collectible makers include Swarovski, Fenton Art Class Company, Westmoreland Glass Company, and the traditional glassmakers of Murano, Italy.

== Cultural references ==
In the play The Glass Menagerie by Tennessee Williams, Laura has a small collection of animal glass figurines.
