= Winmark =

American used goods retailer

Winmark Corporation
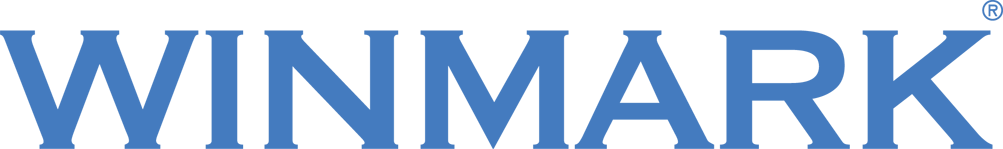
- Winmark Corporation's logo
- Formerly: Play It Again Sports Franchise Corporation (1988–1993); Grow Biz International Inc. (1993–2001); Winmark Corporation (2001–present)
- Type: Public
- Traded as: Nasdaq: WINA; Russell 2000 component; S&P 600 component
- Founded: 1988; 38 years ago
- Founders: Ron Olson and Jeffrey Dahlberg
- Headquarters: Minneapolis, Minnesota
- Key people: Brett Heffes (CEO)
- Revenue: ▲US$86.1 million (2025)
- Net income: ▲US$41.7 million (2025)
- Divisions: Music Go Round; Once Upon a Child; Plato's Closet; Play It Again Sports; Style Encore
- Subsidiaries: Wirth Business Credit
- Website: winmarkcorporation.com

Winmark Corporation is an American franchisor of five retail businesses that specialize in buying and selling used goods. The company is based in Minneapolis, Minnesota. Winmark was founded in 1988 as Play It Again Sports Franchise Corporation by Ron Olson and Jeffrey Dahlberg after they purchased the Play It Again Sports franchise rights from Martha Morris. They renamed the company to Grow Biz International Inc. in June 1993. Grow Biz went public in August 1993. In 2000, John Morgan replaced Dahlberg as CEO and renamed the company to Winmark in 2001. Morgan rescued Winmark from the verge of bankruptcy by selling financially failing franchise concepts and stores and replacing the management team. The company's strategy was to move from owning stores itself to having franchisees own all the stores.

Winmark Corporation owns five franchise-based retail companies that focus on used goods: Music Go Round (musical instruments), Once Upon a Child (children's clothes and toys), Plato's Closet (adolescent and young adult clothes), Play It Again Sports (sports equipment), and Style Encore (women's clothing). Winmark also owned but subsequently sold four franchise-based retailed companies: Computer Renaissance (computer equipment), Disc Go Round (CDs), It's About Game (computer games and video games), and ReTool (tools). Its subsidiary Wirth Business Credit is a small-business supplies leasing company.

Around 2013, research company IBISWorld reported that in the used goods outlet market, Goodwill Industries was first with a 21.5% share, Winmark was second with nearly 6%, and The Salvation Army was third with nearly 4%. In 2016, Winmark had a $1 billion market share in the $17 billion resell industry through its 1,170 franchisees.

== History ==
Ron Olson and Jeffrey Dahlberg started a consulting firm, Franchise Business Systems, in 1986. Olson had been the president of R.J. Brandon Galleries and Dahlberg had been the chief executive officer of his father Kenneth H. Dahlberg's company, Dahlberg Inc. (now Miracle-Ear). Martha Morris was an initial customer of Olson and Dahlberg's consulting company. Morris, who started Play It Again Sports in 1983 in Uptown, Minneapolis, had purchased camping and backpacking supplies, found out she was not interested in camping, and decided to sell her used goods. She had attempted to sell a costly, lightly used backpack through making ads and visiting a sports shop, where an employee told her, "We don't sell used equipment." Morris decided to start her own store since she believed other people might have used sports equipment they would like to sell.

Morris expressed a desire to make her idea a franchise. Although Olson and Dahlberg were first concerned about the idea's outlook for success, their worries disappeared after they dropped by her outlet a Saturday morning and found a line of 10 customers before Morris' store had even opened. Their strategy to captivate franchisees was to add urbanity to something they called a "garage sale-looking environment" but not harm the initial idea. Olson and Dahlberg quickly realized they preferred to be the owners of a company instead of be advisers. Morris sold her Play It Again Sports franchise rights to Olson and Dahlberg in 1988. She sold her stores to them in 1990. Play It Again Sports became Winmark's first division.

The company was incorporated as Play It Again Sports Franchise Corporation in 1988 and was renamed to Grow Biz International Inc. in June 1993. It went public in August 1993. The company was listed on NASDAQ as GBIZ; it is now listed on NASDAQ as WINA. In 1995, a significant number of the company's franchises were on Entrepreneur's annual "Franchise 500" list. In 2001, Grow Biz was renamed to Winmark Corporation. Winmark Corporation is based in Minneapolis, Minnesota.

In March 2000, John Morgan took over as CEO from Jeff Dahlberg. By a year after joining the company as CEO, Morgan rescued Winmark from the precipice of bankruptcy by introducing stringent review of franchisee finances, shuttering failing Play It Again Sports stores, and appointing his own people to executive and board positions. Morgan chose Steve Briggs, who had been at Valspar, as the company's president. He selected as board members Kirk MacKenzie, whom he had worked with at Winthrop Resources, and Paul Reyelts, the chief financial officer at Valspar. In June 2000, Winmark sold its corporate headquarters building to Koch Trucking. The company had lost $350,700 in 2000; in 2001, it had a net income of $3.2 million. Morgan said in a 2009 interview with the Star Tribune about the state of Winmark before he joined, "The company was very good at selling franchises, but it was still losing money." Around 2002, Winmark sold the franchises Retool, Computer Renaissance and Disc-Go-Round.

In 2011, Winmark was ranked the 11th company on Forbes's "The Top 20 Small Public Companies In America". Around 2013, research company IBISWorld found that in the used goods outlet market, Goodwill Industries was first with a 21.5% share, Winmark was second with nearly 6%, and The Salvation Army was third with nearly 4%. In 2016, the company had a $1 billion market share in the $17 billion resell industry through its 1,170 franchisees.

In February 2016, President Brett Heffes was chosen as Winmark's next CEO, succeeding John Morgan, who became the executive chairman. According to a 2014 article in The Toronto Star, Morgan holds the most shares in the company.

== Franchises ==
Winmark Corporation owns five franchise-based retail companies that focus on used goods: Music Go Round (musical instruments), Once Upon a Child (children's clothes and toys), Plato's Closet (adolescent and young adult clothes), Play It Again Sports (sports equipment), and Style Encore (women's clothing). Winmark sold four franchise-based retailed companies: Computer Renaissance (computer equipment), Disc Go Round (CDs), It's About Game (computer games and video games), and ReTool (tools).

The cost to become a franchisee in 2009 was $25,000 and five percent of the franchisee's gross revenue. Franchisees further are required to pay Winmark for advertising and miscellaneous assistance. Although Winmark's contract with franchisees does not allot them territories, the contract ensures that any rival outlets must be located five or more miles away.

Despite Winmark's specializing in used goods, its stores sell new goods too. Through its many stores, Winmark uses its buying power to negotiate competitive prices for the stores' new goods. It also teaches franchisees about the used goods industry and offers pricing software to establish standards for the used goods they purchase.

Between 2006 and 2010, Winmark started around 50 stores annually. In 2013, Winmark had over 1,000 franchised stores—none of which it owned—that in total had sales of over $900 million.

=== Current franchises ===
==== Music Go Round ====
Music Go Round purchases, sells, and exchanges used musical instruments and paraphernalia. Founded as Hi-Tech Consignments in Minneapolis by Bill Shell in 1986, Winmark purchased it in 1993 and renamed it to Music Go Round. In 2009, roughly 30% of Music Go Round's musical instruments purchased were new. In 2011, it had 35 locations in the United States. In 2010, the complete cost to start a Music Go Round was $300,000 and the average yearly sales were between $650,000 and $725,000.

==== Once Upon a Child ====
Once Upon a Child purchases and sells used children's attire and toys. The first Once Upon a Child store was opened in 1985 in Perrysburg, Ohio, by Dennis and Lynn Blum in 1985 after they observed Goodwill Industries accepting and selling used baby attire. Prior to opening a store, Lynn Blum had been selling her three sons' and friends' and neighbors' clothing in a garage sale from her house every week. Her husband resigned from his employment in 1989 to work with Lynn . Winmark purchased the company in 1992. In 2009, roughly 10% of Once Upon a Child's children's attire and playthings purchased were new. In 2011, it had 240 locations in the United States and 24 in Canada. In 2010, the complete cost to start a Once Upon a Child was between $200,000 and $250,000 and the average yearly sales were between $650,000 and $725,000.

==== Plato's Closet ====
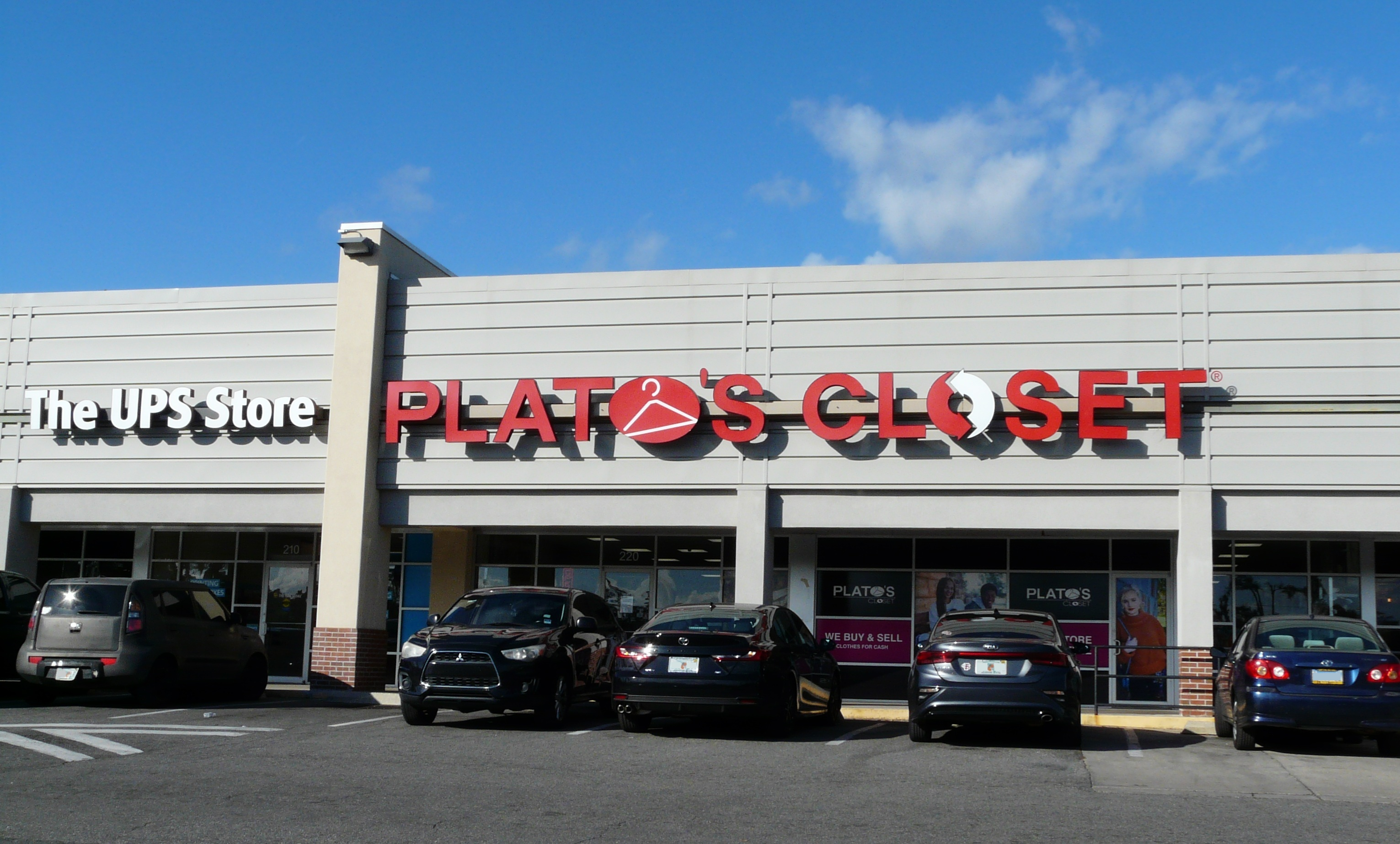
Plato's Closet in Tallahassee, Florida

Plato's Closet purchases and sells used brand name teenager and young adult clothing, shoes, and accessories. It focuses on clothes for people ages 12 to 24. Winmark purchased Plato's Closet from Dennis and Lynn Blum, the founders of Once Upon a Child, in 1998. The store's name was inspired by a Blum son's schoolwork about Plato who had been an early advocate of recycling, which paralleled the aim to recycle used clothes. In 2011, there were over 280 franchisees in the United States and Canada. In 2010, the complete cost to start a Plato's Closet was between $200,000 and $250,000 and the average yearly sales were $825,000.

A 2001 article in the Star Tribune noted that Plato's Closet in 2001 stocked up on brand names such as Abercrombie & Fitch, Gap Inc., Silver Jeans Co., Sean John, Express, Inc., and Dr. Martens that they sold at a markdown of between 50% and 75%. Unlike consignment shops, Plato's Closet pays sellers on the spot. Used clothes are purchased at between 30% and 40% of what Plato's Closet intends to sell them at. In a 2009 interview with Star Tribune, CEO John Morgan said Plato's Closet did the best during the Great Recession among Winmark's franchises because people were more likely to sell used clothing to make money and to buy used clothing to save money.

==== Play It Again Sports ====
Play It Again Sports purchases and sells used sports goods and is Winmark's largest chain. Roughly 70% of Play It Again Sports' sports equipment is new. In 2011, it had over 330 locations in the United States and Canada. In 2010, the complete cost to start a Play It Again Sports was $300,000 and the average yearly sales were between $650,000 and $725,000.

==== Style Encore ====
Style Encore buys and sells used women's and men's clothing. In January 2013, Winmark announced that it would start a new franchise, Style Encore, that would focus on used women's clothing. The first store opened in Texas in August 2013. Style Encore immediately pays cash to people looking to sell used women's and men's attire, footwear, handbags, and jewelry.

=== Former franchises ===
==== Computer Renaissance ====
Computer Renaissance bought and sold new and used computer supplies such as computers, computer memory, computer monitors, and printers. The store also sold computer games and books and helped customers build custom computers. Computer Renaissance was started in 1993. On July 7, 2000, Winmark sold Computer Renaissance, which had 209 stores, to Jack Hollis' Hollis Technologies LLC in Lakeland, Florida, for $3 million. Hollis had been a Computer Renaissance franchisee. CEO John Morgan stated that the business was spun off as unlike durable products like musical instruments and sporting goods that always have a strong resale market, Computer Renaissance's used equipment and software had a lower resale value due to the era's rapidly-changing technology.

==== Disc Go Round ====
Disc Go Round bought and sold new and used compact discs (CDs). In July 1994, Winmark spent $2.3 million to purchase CDX Audio, which used the name CD Exchange in Green Bay, Wisconsin. When Winmark purchased the company, it had 42 stores. Winmark renamed the used CD store to Disc Go Round because they could not nationally trademark the name "CD Exchange". The outlet had an electronic system that recorded all the CDs a store had so customers did not have to browse the shelves trying to determine whether a particular CD was present. Disc Go Around also had "listening stations" for customers to listen to CDs. Winmark sold Disc Go Round, which had increased to 137 stores, to CD Warehouse on June 26, 1998, for $7.4 million.

==== It's About Games ====
It's About Games bought and sold used PC games, video games, and board games. It was founded in Cleveland as Video Game Exchange in 1990 and grew to 83 stores by the end of 1994, but its excessive expansion resulted in a Chapter 11 bankruptcy in February 1995 and the closure of half its stores. Winmark spent roughly $6.8 million to acquire Video Game Exchange in 1997 and renamed it to It's About Games. It's About Games locations were largely in Ohio, Pennsylvania, Kentucky, Georgia and Maryland. It made money for Winmark until 1998. During its last year under Winmark management, It's About Games lost $3.4 million due to excessive inventory, a buggy computer system, poorly chosen products, and improperly trained employees. Winmark owned 60 of the 64 It's About Games stores in the franchise and would have been profitable without It's About Games. Winmark sold or closed all its It's About Games stores in 1999 to reduce losses. Winmark also aimed to cut down on the number of stores it owned because it wanted to focus on franchisee-owned stores.

==== ReTool ====
ReTool bought and sold used tools. Winmark opened the first ReTool on November 10, 1999, in Chicago. Roughly 65% of ReTool's goods were purchased from people, while the remainder was purchased from factories that produced too many tools or from closing businesses. CEO John Morgan said in an October 2000 interview that many people did not sell tools they did not use so it was hard to accumulate used tools at ReTool. Winmark sold ReTool around 2002.

== Subsidiaries ==
=== Wirth Business Credit ===
Wirth Business Credit is a small-business supplies leasing company owned by Winmark. In a 2008 interview with the Star Tribune, CEO John Morgan said Winmark plowed the $9 million to $10 million in profit from its franchisees into Wirth Business Credit because they believed leasing supplies will become a profitable business even though the current growth had been slow. In 2008, there were 27 Wirth Business Credit franchises.

In 2004, Winmark created Winmark Business Solutions, a website for small businesses owners. Winmark Business Solutions was intended to help franchisees and clients of Wirth Business Credit. The website hosted 6,000 pages related to business such as how to found a company and how to sell a company. It had a forum for people to discuss small business issues and its articles also discussed finance, insurance, and technology topics with a focus on business.
