= Nicholas Lutz =

Nicholas J. Lutz (21 February 1835 St. Louis-lès-Bitche, France - 31 March 1906 Somerville, Massachusetts) was a French glassmaker who received his training at the Cristalleries de St. Louis, and later emigrated to the United States where he settled in White Mills in Pennsylvania, later working at the Boston and Sandwich Glass Company.
