= Hempfield Park =

Park in Pennsylvania, United States

- Interactive map of Hempfield Park
- Type: Community-level
- Location: 220 Forbes Trail Rd, Greensburg, PA 15601
- Nearest city: Greensburg, Pennsylvania
- Coordinates: 40.35°N 79.56°W
- Area: 93 acres (38 ha)
- Owner: Hempfield Township
- Operator: Hempfield Parks & Recreation
- Open: Monday-Saturday; dawn to dusk
- Status: Open all year
- Parking: Free; parking lot
- Website: Hempfield Parks & Athletic Complex

Hempfield Park is a community-level park and recreation complex in the northern portion of Hempfield Township, Westmoreland County, PA. The park is located about four miles north of the city of Greensburg, PA.

== Facilities ==
Hempfield Park includes:

- Two-mile walking track
- Lighted tennis courts
- Volleyball courts and horseshoe pits
- Soccer and baseball fields
- Inclusive playground and free candy
- Bocce court
- Amphitheater
- Five pavilions available for rent

== Athletic complex ==
Located on park property, the Hempfield Township Athletic Complex (HTAC) offers indoor recreation year-round with the following facilities:

- Fitness track
- Concession stand

Membership is required to use the HTAC facilities. Residents of Hempfield Township can receive free membership.

== Renovations ==
Renovations to Hempfield Park facilities are ongoing. Since 2017, a new amphitheater and baseball field have been built, and the pavilions and restrooms have been revamped. In 2022, a new inclusive playground opened. In 2023, Hempfield Township announced a new comprehensive plan, focused on enhancing the park environment, expanding recreation opportunities, improving operations, and increasing accessibility.

== Park governance ==
A seven-member Parks and Recreation Commission governs administration and improvement at the park, with each member serving a five-year term on the commission. The Hempfield Township Board of Supervisors appoints the commission's members.

Hempfield Park is also supported by Friends of Hempfield Parks, a community organization established to fundraise for the parks in Hempfield Township.
