= Amos Hutchinson =

American politician

Amos K. Hutchinson

Member of the Pennsylvania House of Representatives from the 57th district
- In office 1969–1988
- Preceded by: District created
- Succeeded by: Thomas Tangretti

Personal details
- Born: January 1, 1920
- Died: August 1, 1990 (aged 70)
- Party: Democratic

Amos K. Hutchinson (January 1, 1920 – August 1, 1990) is a former Democratic member of the Pennsylvania House of Representatives.

== Issues ==
In April 1986, residents of Greensburg, Pennsylvania, who were represented by Hutchinson, expressed anger and frustration with him and with executives of the Greater Greensburg Sewage Authority because of their failure to respond to their requests for help in fixing the basement flooding problems they were having due to a small stream which overflowed its banks repeatedly. Residents, who said they had been assured by Hutchinson that $350,000 had been allocated from the state for use by the sewage authority to create a new storm sewer, were angry at city officials who claimed that the state had not yet provided the money for the construction. Residents pointed out that sewage authority personnel could at least attempt to alleviate their flooding problems by cleaning the creek of debris while waiting for the state to follow through with the promised storm sewer funding.
