= Tim Krieger =

American politician

Tim Kreiger

Member of the Pennsylvania House of Representatives from the 57th district
- In office January 6, 2009 – December 29, 2015
- Preceded by: Thomas Tangretti
- Succeeded by: Eric Nelson

Personal details
- Party: Republican
- Spouse: Eleanor Krieger
- Children: Sarah, Elisabeth, Abigail and Jack
- Education: Liberty University; University of Pittsburgh
- Website: repkrieger.com

Timothy A. Krieger is an American Republican politician who represented the 57th district in the Pennsylvania House of Representatives from 2009 to 2015.

== Personal life ==
Krieger grew up in Connellsville, attending Connellsville Area Senior High School. He then attended Liberty University, graduating with a degree in mathematics in 1984. Krieger then entered the United States Navy before attending law school at the University of Pittsburgh, from which he graduated in 1992. He was in private practice, most recently in Greensburg, Pennsylvania until he was elected to the PA House of Reps for the 57th district in 2008. Later, he was elected to be a Westmoreland County Court of Common Pleas judge.

== Political career ==
Kreiger was elected to the Pennsylvania House of Representatives in November 2008, defeating John W. Boyle and winning the previously Democratic seat with 52% of the vote. He served on the Game & Fisheries, Intergovernmental Affairs, Judiciary and State Government committees.
