= Boston and Sandwich Glass Company =

Glass manufacturing company in Massachusetts, United States (1826–1888)

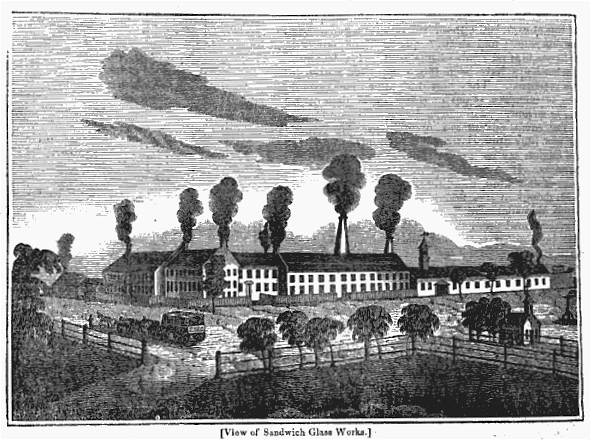
Illustration of the manufactory in Sandwich from the American Magazine, 1835

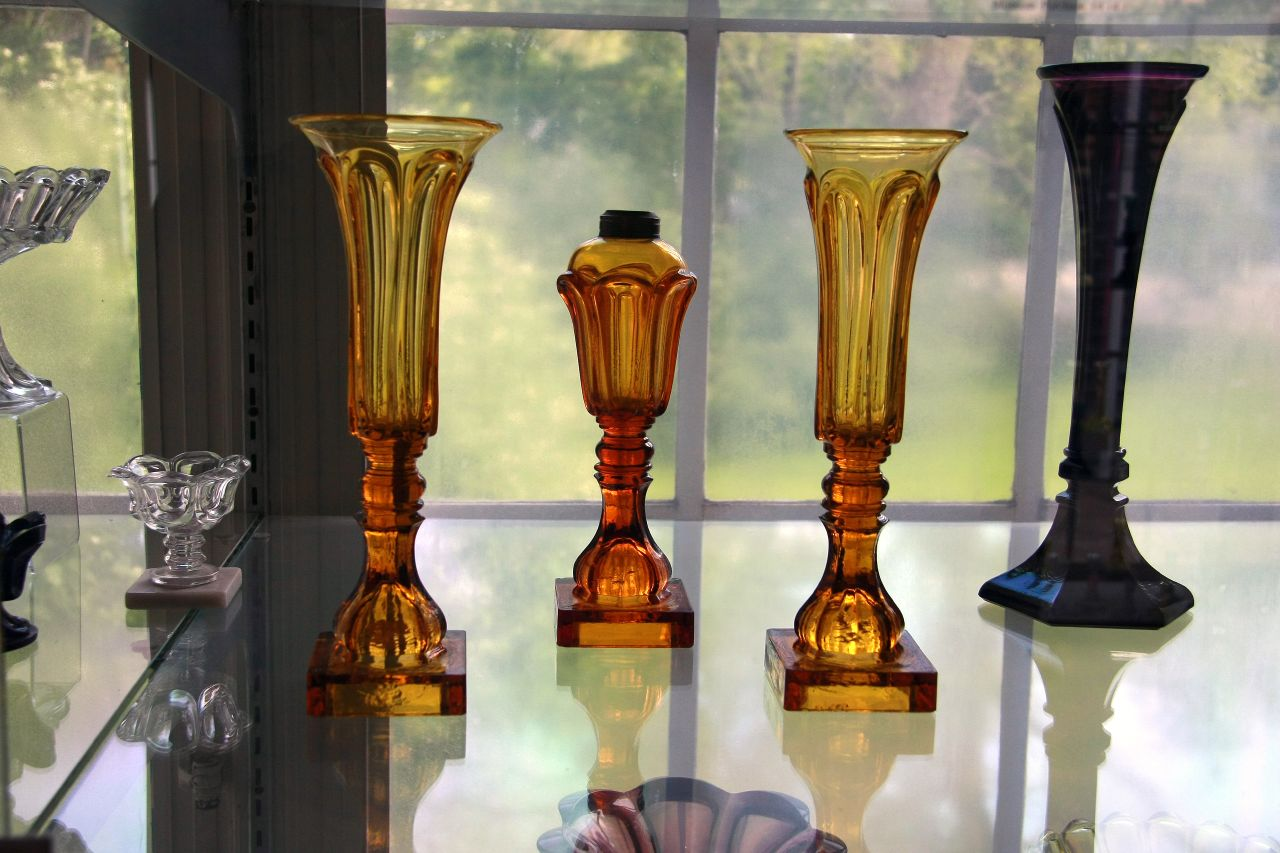
Sandwich glass

The Boston and Sandwich Glass Company was an American glass-making company in Sandwich, Massachusetts, from 1826 to 1888.

== History ==
Deming Jarves established the Sandwich Glass Manufactory in Sandwich in 1825, producing flint glass. This was taken over the following year by the newly incorporated Boston and Sandwich Glass Company, which Jarves also headed. It started with 60 employees and an eight-pot furnace, each pot capable of holding 800 pounds (360 kg). In his 1854 report to the British House of Commons, George Wallis stated the company employed 500 workers and four furnaces of ten pots each, turning out 60 tons of cut and pressed glass per week. Another source gives the same figures, except for the output, which was specified as 50 tons a week.

The factory was one of the earliest to produce pressed glass. In 1827, the pressing mold machine was invented by a man named Robinson who worked at the New England Glass Company—where Jarves had previously been employed as an agent—but the production of pressed glass was perfected by the Boston and Sandwich Glass Company. The company also experimented with colored glass in the 1830s. After the hiring of Nicholas Lutz in 1869, art glass production commenced. Mary Gregory was another important artist in glass; she worked for the company from 1880 to 1884, painting lamps and plaques of landscape scenes.

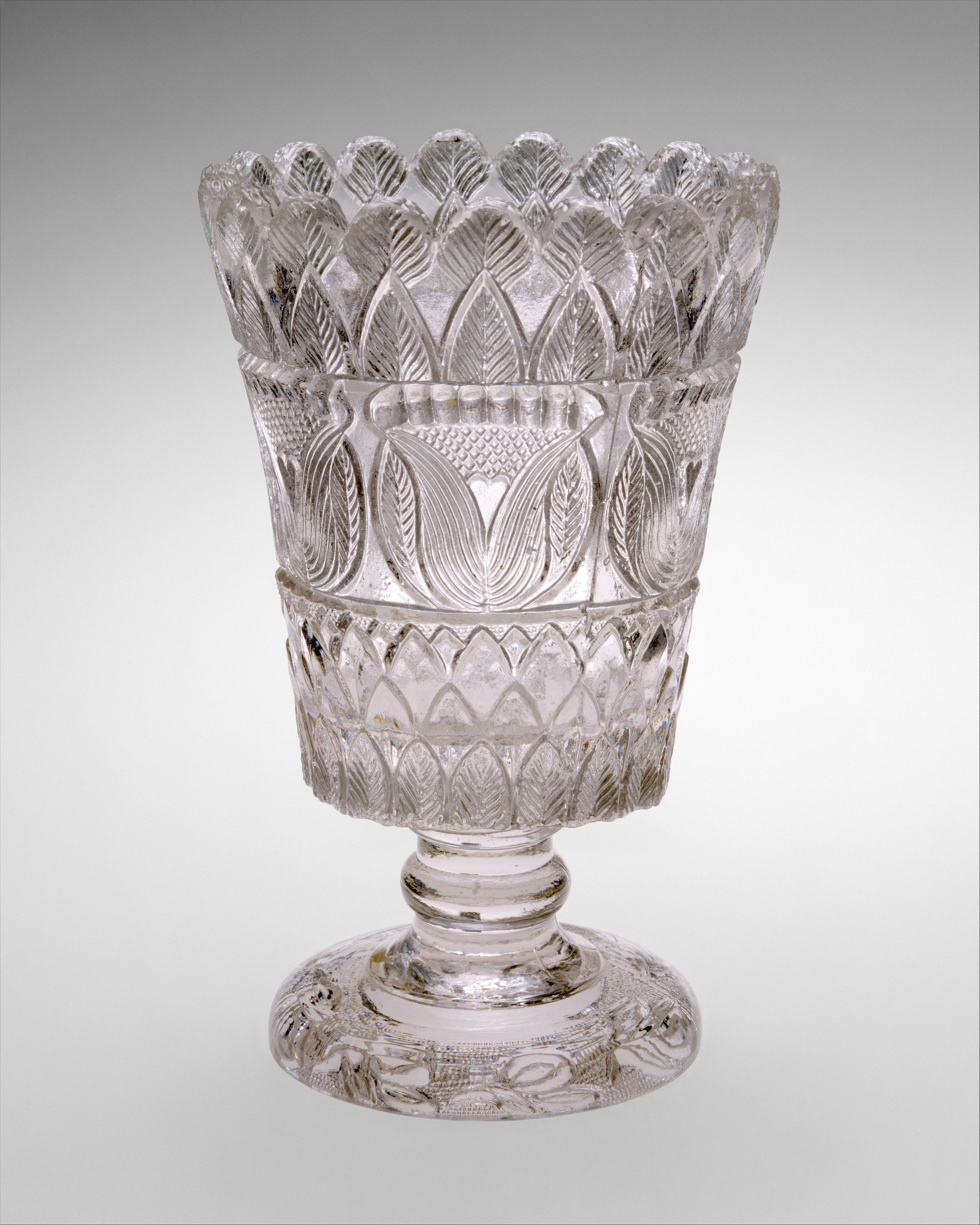
Celery vase by the Boston and Sandwich Glass Company, held at the Metropolitan Museum of Art

Jarves led the company to prosperity until 1858, when after a dispute with the board of directors he and his son John left to establish the Cape Code Glass Works, also in Springfield. His successors were brothers George and Sewall A. Fessenden, the former as superintendent, the latter as the firm's Boston agent. When George Fessenden retired in 1882, Henry Francis Spurr, the head salesman, took his place.

When a newly formed glassmakers' labor union sought a greater share of the profits, the management responded by locking out the workers on January 2, 1888. This and competition from cheaper glass produced in the Midwest brought about the company's demise.

The Sandwich Glass Museum has many of the company's pieces.
