= Brush Creek Salems Church =

Historic church in Pennsylvania, United States

- U.S. National Register of Historic Places
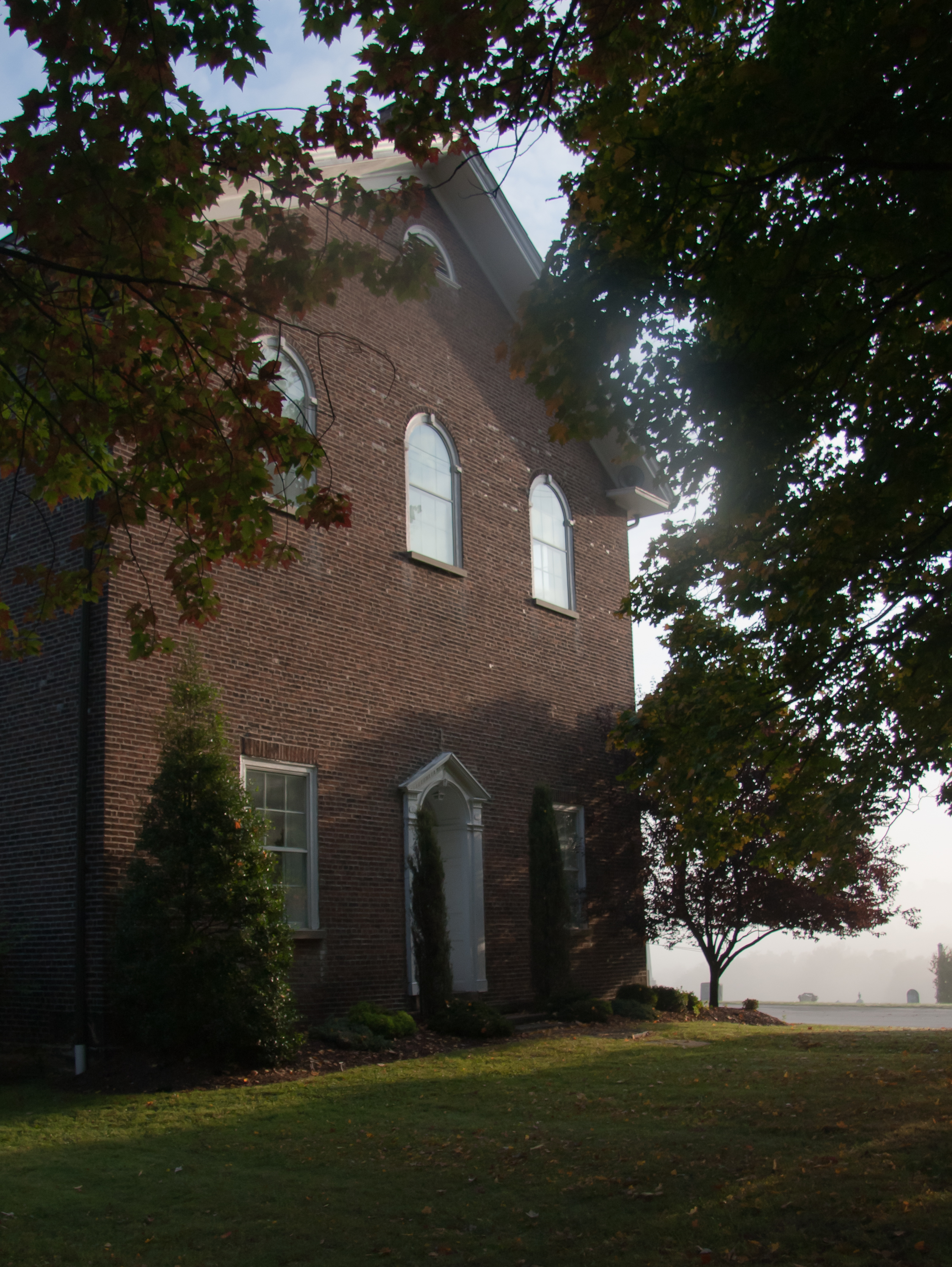
- in 2012

- Location within Pennsylvania Location within the United States
- Location: Southeast of Westmoreland City on Brush Creek Road, Hempfield Township, Pennsylvania
- Coordinates: 40°19′9″N 79°39′30″W
- Area: 1.1 acres (0.45 ha)
- Built: 1816-1820
- Built by: Dry, Jacob
- NRHP reference No.: 87000675
- Added to NRHP: May 11, 1987

Brush Creek Salems Church, now known as Irwin Brush Creek Salem United Church of Christ, is a historic Reformed church building located in Hempfield Township, Westmoreland County, Pennsylvania. It was built between 1816 and 1820, and is a two-story, brick building with a gable roof. The interior features a second floor gallery. A connected gable roofed, one-story addition was built in 1958.

It was added to the National Register of Historic Places in 1987.
