= Westmoreland Mall =

- Westmoreland Mall main entrance in 2025
- Location: Hempfield Township, Westmoreland County, Pennsylvania, U.S.
- Coordinates: 40.301°N 79.508°W
- Address: 5256 U.S. Route 30
- Opened: February 28, 1977; 49 years ago
- Developer: Adam Eidemiller, Inc. and The Goodman Company
- Manager: CBL Properties
- Owner: CBL Properties
- Num. of stores: 170+
- Num. of anchor tenants: 6
- Floor area: 1,287,620 square feet (119,624 m^{2})
- Floors: 2 (3 in the parking garage)
- Parking: 6,436 spaces (covered and uncovered)
- Public transit: WCTA bus: 2F, 9, 9S, 12, 20F
- Website: westmorelandmall.com

Westmoreland Mall is a two-level, enclosed super-regional shopping and casino complex in the municipality of Hempfield Township, Pennsylvania, southeast of Pittsburgh, and owned and operated by CBL Properties. It was completed in 1977 and was extensively renovated and expanded in 1993–1994.

It contains 1,287,620 square feet (119,624 m^{2}) of retail space on 103 acres (0.4 km^{2}) and over 170 retailers, making it the second-largest shopping complex in Western Pennsylvania in terms of square footage and the largest mall between Pittsburgh and Lancaster.

It is located on the eastern side of the Greater Pittsburgh region on the heavily traveled U.S. Route 30 corridor. Adjacent to Westmoreland Mall, many big box retailers and restaurants can be found along the U.S. Route 30 and Donohoe Road retail area, which is the biggest concentration of retailers and other commercial businesses between Monroeville and Altoona.

== History ==
=== Development and early years ===
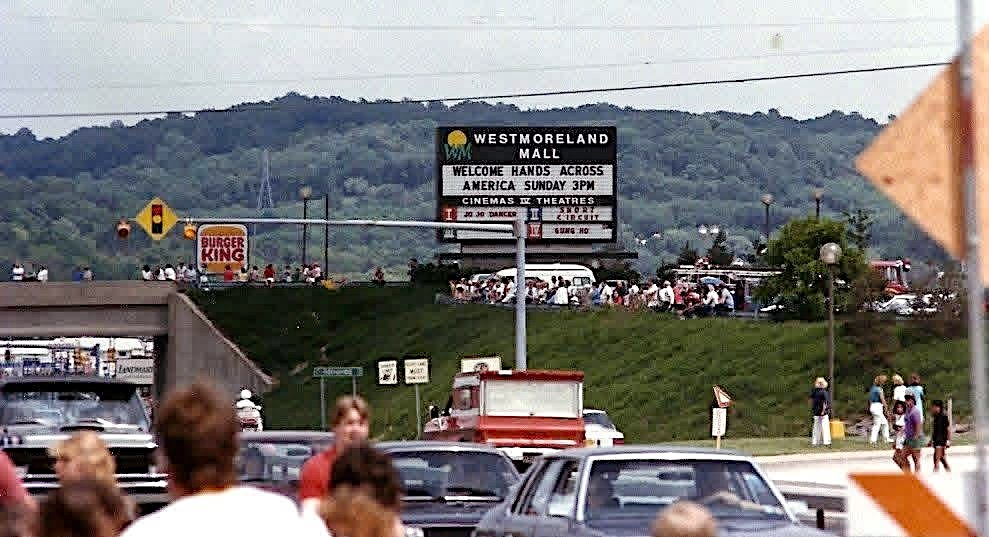
Hands Across America event taking place at Westmoreland Mall in 1986

In the mid-1970s, Greensburg-based Adam Eidemiller, Inc., which owned the property known to locals as Miller's Woods, initially considered developing a motel on the open acreage. As the retail landscape around Greensburg began to change, the company determined that a motel would not represent the best use of the land and instead began considering the property for a regional shopping mall. Around the same period, Kaufmann's and Sears, Roebuck and Co. had approached the Rouse Company, owner of nearby Greengate Mall, about establishing stores there. Rouse declined to undertake the expansion necessary to accommodate the two department stores, leaving an opportunity for another major retail development in the area.

Eidemiller subsequently approached the St. Louis-based May Department Stores Company, parent company of Kaufmann's, about developing a mall with Kaufmann's as an anchor, but the proposal was initially rejected. Eidemiller later partnered with the Goodman Company, a real estate development firm owned by Murray H. Goodman that had experience with large retail projects, including Granite Run Mall near Philadelphia. Construction began in 1975, and Kaufmann's became the first store to open at the complex in late 1976.

Sears had maintained a presence in Greensburg for decades before becoming one of Westmoreland Mall's original anchors. The retailer initially operated on North Main Street in downtown Greensburg before relocating east of the city during the 1960s to the site of the present day Davis Center. A freestanding Sears auto service center was also located adjacent to that store. With the development of Westmoreland Mall, Sears relocated again to a substantially larger two-level store at the new mall. The mall location was approximately twice the size of its predecessor and carried a broader selection of merchandise.

=== Opening ===
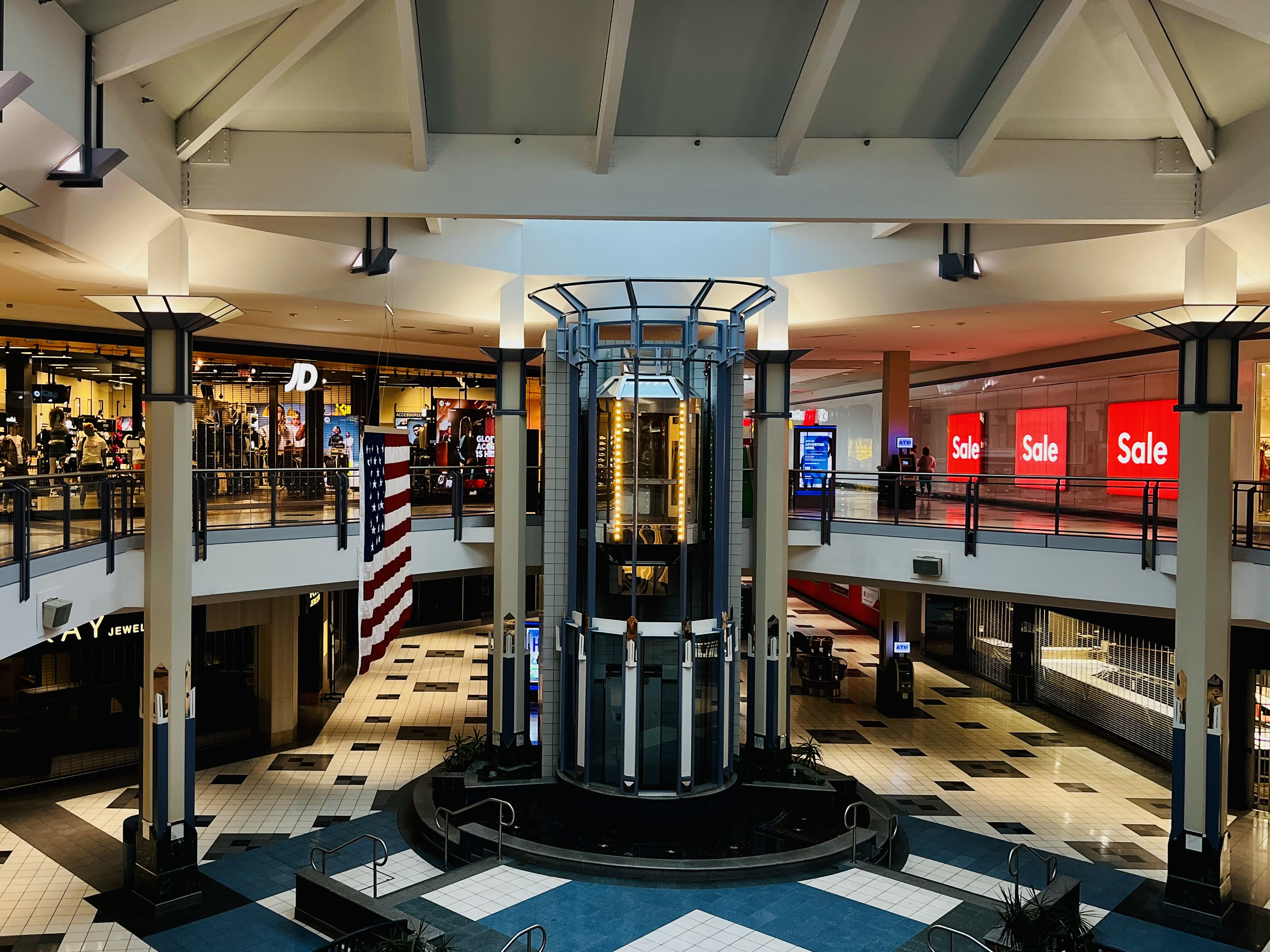
The center court and glass elevator at the mall pictured in 2024

On February 28, 1977, the 850,000-square-foot (79,000 m^{2}) Westmoreland Mall officially opened its doors with Kaufmann's and Sears as the anchor stores and 89 other retailers.

Special events at the new mall included a visit by Mr. McFeely (played by David Newell) of Mister Rogers' Neighborhood. An adjacent shopping center, originally known as the South Annex and later as Westmoreland Crossing, was developed in 1978. Its early tenants included Shop 'n Save and Murphy's Mart. The Westmoreland Mall Shop 'n Save was acquired by the Charley family in 1983.

As the years passed, the mall continued to grow, with the addition of Troutman's Department Store (later replaced by Pomeroy's and The Bon-Ton) and 80,000 square feet (7,000 m^{2}) of additional retail space in 1979. By the mid-1980s, the convenience center at the South Annex was constructed, with 40,000 square feet (4,000 m^{2}) of space for 12 to 15 new stores and restaurants. At this time, the mall was owned and operated by The Kravco Company, now Simon Property Group.

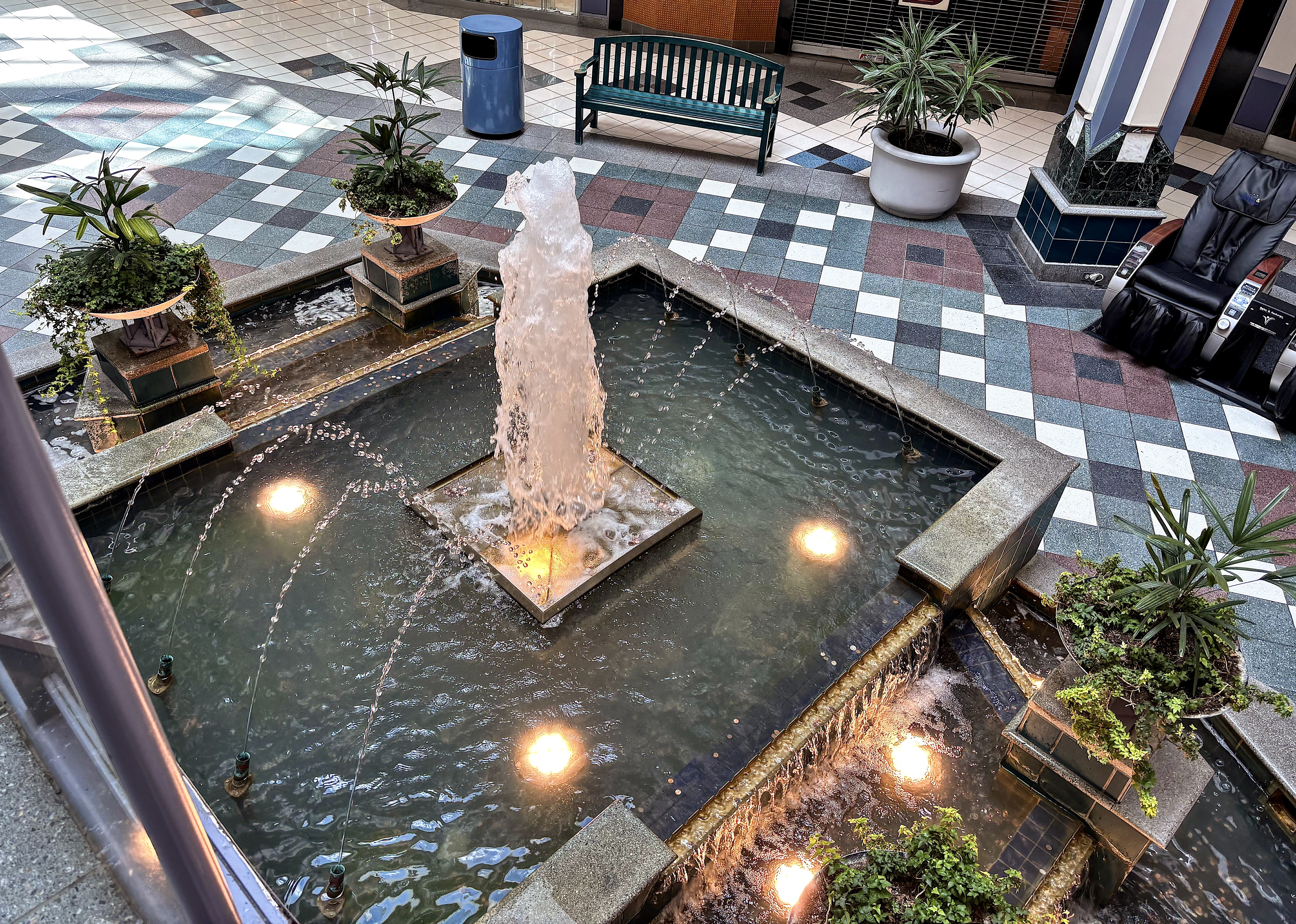
Fountain in the Macy’s court at Westmoreland Mall in 2026

By the early 1990s, significant retailer demand for additional space as well as increasing competition from Pittsburgh-area malls prompted the mall's owners to consider redeveloping the property. In response, it went through a $33 million renovation and expansion project, which broke ground in 1991 with heavy excavation taking place in front of the original main entrance. A three-level, 715-car parking garage was constructed between the Kaufmann's (now Macy's) and Bon-Ton anchor buildings, which opened in November of 1992. The mall reopened following extensive renovations on May 1, 1993. The expansion wing containing a new main entrance leading directly into a 15-bay food court and an additional 30,000 square feet of inline retail space opened November 4, 1993. The project concluded with the grand opening the mall's fourth anchor tenant, JCPenney, which relocated from Greengate Mall, on May 2, 1994.

Another major mall addition took place in 1999, when Carmike Cinemas (now AMC Theatres) opened a new 15-screen stadium-style seating movie theater abutting the annex. The former 4-screen movie theater and a couple of adjacent shops at the mall were converted into Kaufmann's Home, which operates currently as Macy's Home Store.

=== CBL ownership and department store changes ===
CBL Properties acquired Westmoreland Mall and the adjacent Westmoreland Crossing property in December 2002. The transaction was valued at approximately $112.8 million.

Kaufmann's continued to operate as an anchor until 2006. After Federated Department Stores acquired Kaufmann's parent company, The May Department Stores Company, the Kaufmann's name was retired along with several other May regional department store brands. The Kaufmann's stores were converted to the Macy's name in September 2006. Westmoreland Mall subsequently had both a main Macy's department store and a separate Macy's Home Store.

Westmoreland Mall lost two of its longtime traditional department store anchors during the nationwide contraction of department store chains in the late 2010s. Bon-Ton announced in 2018 that it would liquidate its stores after the company entered bankruptcy. The former Bon-Ton property was subsequently redeveloped for the Live! Casino Pittsburgh gaming and entertainment development.

In December 2018, Sears announced that its Westmoreland Mall store would close as part of another round of nationwide store closures. The location closed in early 2019. The former Sears space was later selected for redevelopment as a Dick's House of Sport. The store opened on August 7, 2026.

== Live! Casino Pittsburgh ==
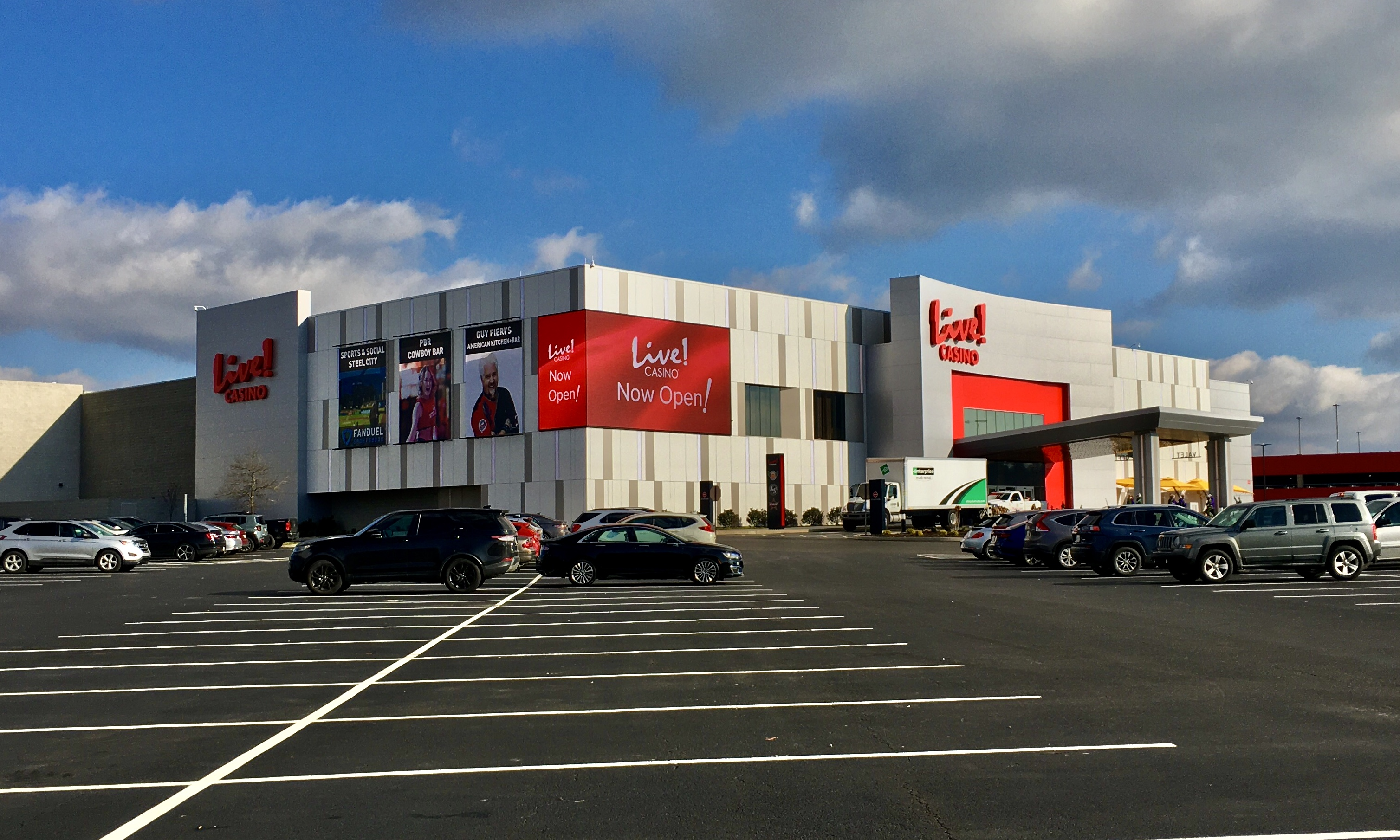
Live! Casino Pittsburgh

Live! Casino Pittsburgh is a gaming and entertainment facility occupying the former Bon-Ton anchor space at Westmoreland Mall. The project was developed by an affiliate of The Cordish Companies after the Bon-Ton store closed in 2018.

The Pennsylvania Gaming Control Board awarded a Category 4 casino license for the Westmoreland County project in August 2019. The approximately $150 million facility opened to the general public on November 24, 2020. The casino became the first Category 4 facility to begin operations in Pennsylvania.

The 31,677-square-foot casino floor includes 750 slot machines and electronic table games, 33 live action table games, a 1,400-square-foot poker room with six table games, and two high-limit rooms, including a high-limit slots room and a high-limit table games room with three tables and a bar. There is parking for more than 6,000 vehicles, including a two-level, 715-car parking deck with a covered walkway to the casino.

Additionally, the casino features a FanDuel sportsbook and lounge, a 7,000-square-foot multi-use event center called The Venue Live!, a small lounge area called the Social Club, as well as several nationally recognized restaurants and live entertainment venues, including Sports & Social Steel City, Mangia featuring DeLallo and PBR Cowboy Bar Pittsburgh. The casino is accessible via exterior entrances, the parking garage as well as within the mall.

In March 2022, Cordish sold the building and ground lease to Gaming and Leisure Properties in a leaseback transaction, along with its sister property, Live! Casino & Hotel Philadelphia.

=== Proposed convention center and hotel ===
In 2025, the Westmoreland County Chamber of Commerce released a feasibility study that identified property adjacent to Live! Casino Pittsburgh as a potential site for a convention center and hotel. The concept included a hotel of approximately 200 rooms and conference facilities. As of February 2026, the proposal had not advanced beyond the planning stage with project financing identified as the principal obstacle.
