= Westmoreland Glass Company =

American producer of collectible art glass (1889–1984)

The Westmoreland Glass Company was a company that produced glass in Grapeville, Pennsylvania.

== History ==
The Westmoreland Glass Company was founded in 1889 when a group of men purchased the Specialty Glass Company located in East Liverpool, Ohio, and moved it to Grapeville, Pennsylvania. Grapeville was chosen as the location of the factory because the property had a large source of natural gas. George West served as president of the company, while his brother Charles West was the Vice President. Ira Brainard was the primary financial backer of Westmoreland. His son J.J. Brainard was an officer in the company. Westmoreland's main production was pressed glass tableware lines, mustard jars, and candy containers. Westmoreland had its own mustard factory and tin shop on the property grounds of the factory. George West is regarded as the "Father of the Candy Container Industry" for the company's extensive production of candy containers. West Brothers was a separate company which produced the candy containers and other tinware while operating from the same factory.

In 1921, George West left the company and started his own glass company, George West and Sons. Charles West became president while J.J. Brainard became vice president of Westmoreland. The company changed its name to the Westmoreland Glass Company. Prior to his departure, George West created a large decorating department at Westmoreland. Under the direction of Charles West, the company began to make high-quality hand-decorated glass from the 1920s through the 1930s, some of which was exhibited at the Carnegie Museum of Art in Pittsburgh, Pennsylvania.

In 1937, Charles West retired and sold his interest to the Brainard family, which controlled the company until 1980. In the 1940s, the Brainards phased out the high-quality hand-decorated glass and began to produce primarily milk glass.

In 1980, the Brainards sold the company to St. Louis, Missouri businessman David Grossman, who had no prior experience running a large glass-manufacturing company. The company went out of business in 1984 and was sold for $75,000 to George Snyder, who converted the property into a storage facility.

== Production ==
The Westmoreland Glass Company is known for its production of high-quality milk glass, but also is known for its high-quality decorated glass. From the 1920s to the 1950s it was estimated that 90 percent of the production was milk glass. Westmoreland produced carnival glass beginning in 1908 and reissued novelties and pattern glass in carnival treatments in the 1970s until the plant closed in 1984. Westmoreland also produced high quality hand-decorated cut glass.

== Patterns ==
Patterns made by Westmoreland include:

- Paneled Grape
- Beaded Grape
- American Hobnail
- Old Quilt (also known as Checkerboard)
- Colonial
- Floral Colonial
- Wildflower and Lace
- Doric (also known as Laced Edge)
- Beaded Edge
- Carolina Dogwood - Petals and leaves surrounding a five petal flower in the center. The mold for this was acquired by Fenton Glass who issued pieces in purple and red.
- Corinth - Ribbed pattern with 12 ribs, used for vases or flattened out for bowls and plates.
- Della Robbia
- English Hobnail
- Shell and Jewels - Early pattern used on the Victor line. This is a scarce pattern in carnival treatments.
- Waterford / Wakefield ruby red

== Maker marks ==
Westmoreland was known to use primarily two marks on their products. The first mark was a "W" found inside of a Keystone which can be found from the period of 1910 through the mid 1940s. The second mark, which is the more commonly known by collectors and dealers, is the intertwined W and G that Westmoreland began to use in 1946 on most of the glassware. In 1981, David Grossman bought the factory from the Brainard family and changed the mark. The new mark was the word Westmoreland in a circle around three lines.
