= Play It Again Sports =

Sporting goods store

Play It Again Sports, Inc.

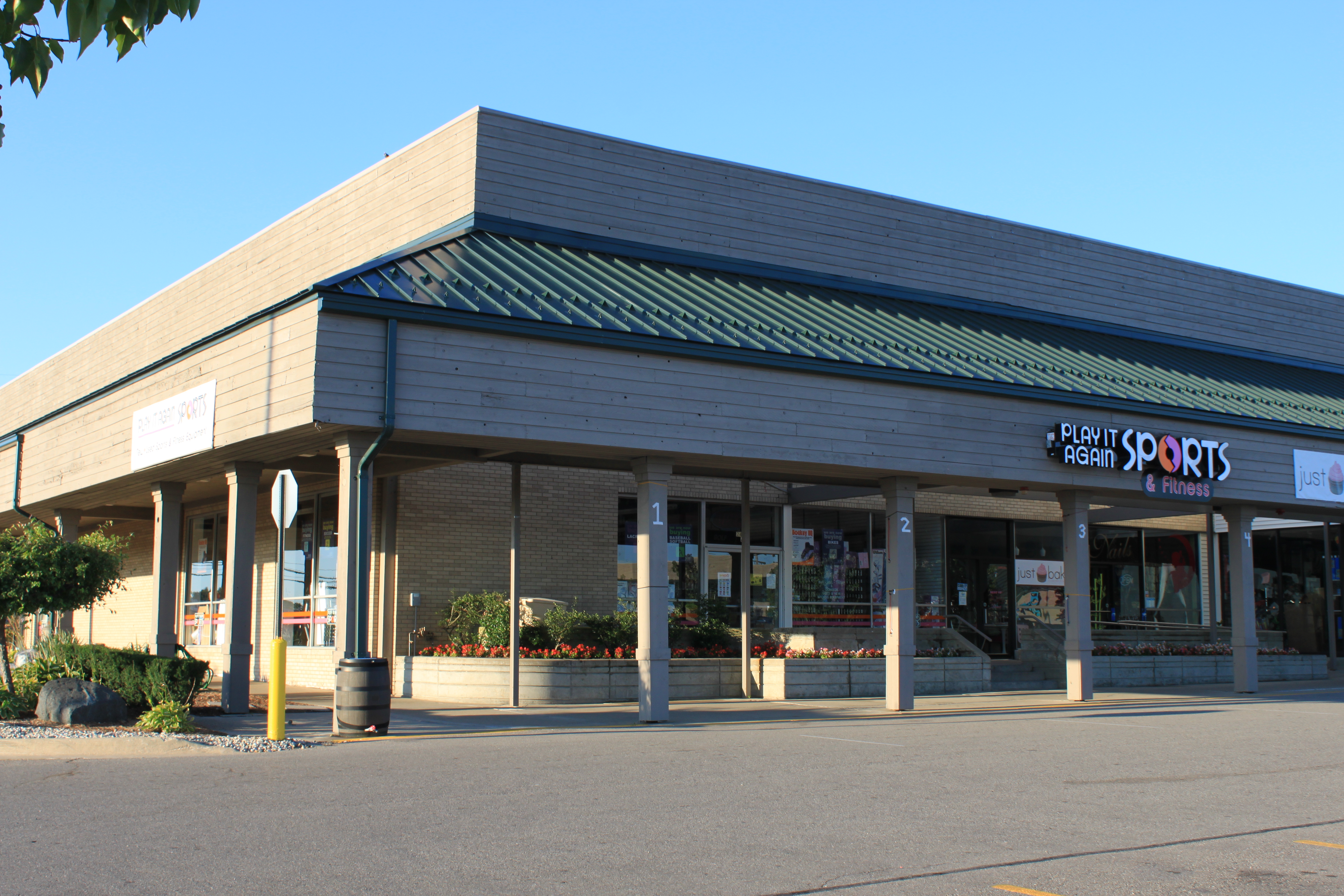
- Type: Privately held company
- Industry: Retail
- Founded: 1983; 43 years ago
- Founder: Martha Morris
- Headquarters: Minneapolis, Minnesota, U.S.
- Area served: United States; Canada
- Parent: Winmark Corporation
- Website: www.playitagainsports.com

Play It Again Sports is a franchised chain store in the United States and Canada that buys and sells used and new sporting goods. They try to keep a forty–sixty split between used and new equipment respectively. Most franchisees will also provide skate sharpening.

Play It Again Sports started in 1983 by Martha Morris of Minneapolis, she made over US$120,000 in her first year. Franchising began in the year 1988, growing to over 260 stores in the United States and 39 in Canada. In 1990 Morris sold it to two financial consultants by the names of Jeffrey Dahlberg and Ronald Olson who later re-branded to the Winmark Corporation. All stores are independently owned and operated.
