= Once Upon A Child =

Secondhand clothing store chain

Once Upon A Child is a secondhand clothing store that buys and sells used clothing, shoes, toys, books, and other baby equipment. Currently, they have over 400 stores across the United States and Canada. While the company is a chain, stores are individually owned and operated.

== History ==
Lynn and Dennis Blum started Once Upon A Child in 1984, opening their first store in Ohio. The ideas for Once Upon A Child was to provide financial relief for parents who were constantly purchasing new items for their children due to their rapid growth rates.

They sold the franchise rights for Once Upon A Child to Growbiz International (now Winmark Cooperation) in 1992.

== Clothing model ==
Once Upon a Child pays sellers same-day, in cash, for items sold to the store. They do not offer any other form of payment, including store credit. Items brought to the store and checked against pre-determined guidelines which vary by location, but generally include condition, style, brand and safety standards. Items accepted by the store are checked for product safety and measures all toys and other products against safety standards and recalls. Clothes, accessories, and shoes normally accepted by the store must not be more than 5 years old, but this varies by item and location. If a customer chooses to sell items, the store offers them a 15% discount on goods purchased that day.

== Locations ==
The first Once Upon A Child store was opened in Perrysburg, Ohio in 1984. A franchise was opened in Osaka, Japan in 2000.

== Awards ==
The company currently ranks in Entrepreneur's Franchise 500.
