= Hempfield Township, Westmoreland County, Pennsylvania =

Township in Pennsylvania, US

Coordinates: 40°20′00″N 79°29′29″W

- Township
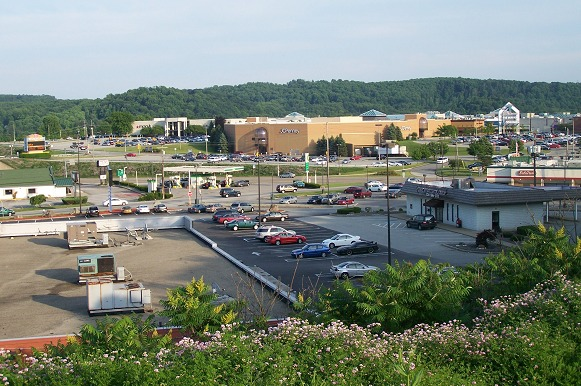
- Hempfield Township with U.S. Route 30 and Westmoreland Mall viewable

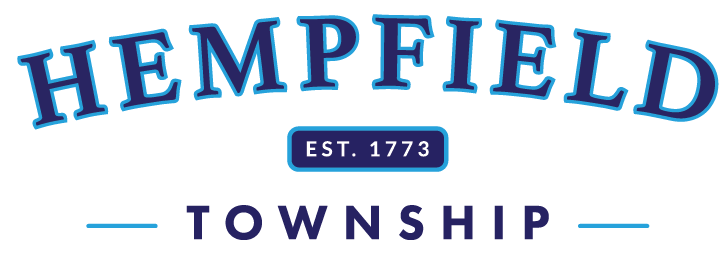
- Logo
- Motto: "A Great Place to Raise a Family"
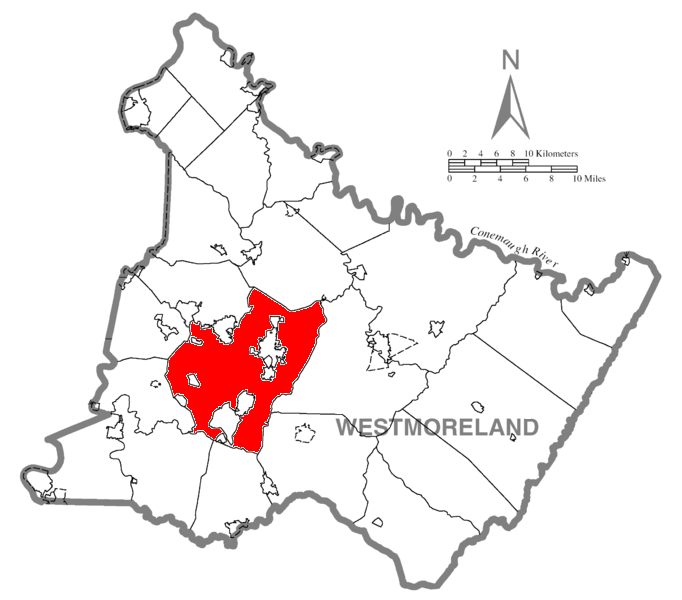
- Location of Hempfield Township in Westmoreland County, Pennsylvania

- Location of Westmoreland County in Pennsylvania
- Country: United States
- State: Pennsylvania
- County: Westmoreland
- Incorporated: April 6, 1773

Area
  - Total: 76.87 sq mi (199.10 km^{2})
  - Land: 76.73 sq mi (198.72 km^{2})
  - Water: 0.14 sq mi (0.37 km^{2})

Population (2020)
  - Total: 41,585 ▼
  - Estimate (2021): 41,664
  - Density: 540/sq mi (208/km^{2})
- Time zone: UTC-5 (Eastern (EST))
  - Summer (DST): UTC-4 (EDT)
- ZIP code: 15601
- Area code: 724
- FIPS code: 42-129-33792
- Website: https://www.hempfieldtwp.com

Hempfield Township is a township in Westmoreland County, Pennsylvania, United States. The population was 41,585 at the 2,020 census, making it the largest suburb in the Pittsburgh Metropolitan Area by population. Its name is derived from Hempfield in Lancaster County, which was formed in 1729 and is named after the hemp fields in the area.

== Geography ==
According to the U.S. Census Bureau, the township has a total area of 76.8 square miles (199 km^{2}), of which 76.6 square miles (198 km^{2}) is land and 0.2 square miles (0.52 km^{2}) is water.

The township contains the following communities: Armbrust, Bovard, Carbon, Centerville, Darragh, Eastwood, Emmonston, Evanston, Fort Allen, Grapeville, Hannastown, Haydenville, High Park, Lincoln Heights, Luxor, Maplewood Terrace, Midway, Radebaugh, St. Clair, Stonevilla, Swede Hill, White Hill, and West Point.

== Surrounding and inner neighborhoods ==
Hempfield Township has thirteen borders, including Salem Township to the north, Unity Township to the east, Mount Pleasant Township to the southeast, East Huntingdon Township, Hunker and South Huntingdon Township to the south, Sewickley Township to the west and south-southwest, Madison to the southwest, North Huntingdon Township to the west-northwest, and Manor, Penn Township, the borough of Penn and the city of Jeannette, all to the northwest.

The city of Greensburg and six separate boroughs - Southwest Greensburg, South Greensburg, Youngwood, New Stanton, Arona, and Adamsburg - are entirely situated within Hempfield Township.

== Demographics ==
Historical population
Census	Pop.	Note	%±
1970	36,208		—
1980	43,396		19.9%
1990	42,609		−1.8%
2000	40,721		−4.4%
2010	43,241		6.2%
2020	41,585		−3.8%
2021 (est.)	41,664		0.2%

At the 2000 census there were 40,721 people, 15,997 households, and 11,597 families living in the township. The population density was 531.5 inhabitants per square mile (205.2/km^{2}). There were 16,799 housing units at an average density of 219.2 per square mile (84.6/km^{2}). The racial makeup of the township was 97.42% White, 1.11% Black or African American, 0.08% Native American, 0.84% Asian, 0.04% Pacific Islander, 0.11% from other races, and 0.40% from two or more races. Hispanic or Latino people of any race were 0.38%.

Of the 15,997 households, 28.4% had children under the age of 18 living with them, 61.8% were married couples living together, 7.8% had a female householder with no husband present, and 27.5% were non-families. 24.3% of households were one person and 11.7% were one person aged 65 or older. The average household size was 2.43 and the average family size was 2.89.

The age distribution was 20.4% under the age of 18, 7.5% from 18 to 24, 26.5% from 25 to 44, 27.8% from 45 to 64, and 17.8% 65 or older. The median age was 42 years. For every 100 females, there were 93.2 males. For every 100 females age 18 and over, there were 90.1 males.

The median household income was $42,288 and the median family income was $52,440. Males had a median income of $39,001 versus $25,838 for females. The per capita income for the township was $21,839. Six percent of the population and 4.1% of families were below the poverty line. Out of the total population, 7.8% of those under the age of 18 and 7.0% of those 65 and older were living below the poverty line.

== Government ==
The township uses the Pennsylvania State Police (PSP) as the sole form of law enforcement. As of 2016 it is the most populous Pennsylvania municipality to do so.

== Education ==
Public school students attend the Hempfield Area School District, which includes Hempfield Township and the communities of Adamsburg, Armbrust, Bovard, Grapeville, Hunker, Luxor, Manor, New Stanton, and Youngwood. Students can also attend Greensburg Central Catholic High School. Hempfield Township is also the location of the campus of the University of Pittsburgh at Greensburg, the Youngwood campus of Westmoreland County Community College and the Westmoreland satellite campus of Carlow University.

== Economy ==
Hempfield Township is a major economic player in Westmoreland County. As the retail hub for Westmoreland County and the Laurel Highlands region in particular, it is home to the popular Westmoreland Mall and the adjoining Live! Casino Pittsburgh, the second largest shopping and entertainment complex in the Pittsburgh Metropolitan Area. In addition, Greengate Centre serves as the area's largest big-box retail center. Several smaller shopping centers, well-known national retailers and restaurants can also be found in the township.

Light industry can also be found within Hempfield Township including numerous industrial parks and facilities. RIDC Westmoreland straddles Hempfield and East Huntingdon townships.

== 2011 tornado ==
On March 23, 2011, a funnel cloud briefly appeared over the central area of Hempfield Township southwest of the city of Greensburg just around 4:45 PM and eventually touched down as an EF2 tornado, causing widespread damage to scores of homes in the West Hempfield area as well as the Fort Allen neighborhood and in neighboring Sewickley Township. Hempfield Area High School was especially impacted with major damage to the auditorium's roof and stadium, as was nearby Harrold Middle School.

== See also ==
- Brush Creek Salems Church
- Hempfield Park
- Site of Old Hannastown
- Baltzer Meyer Historical Society
