= Grapeville, Pennsylvania =

Unincorporated community in Pennsylvania, US

Grapeville
- Census-designated place
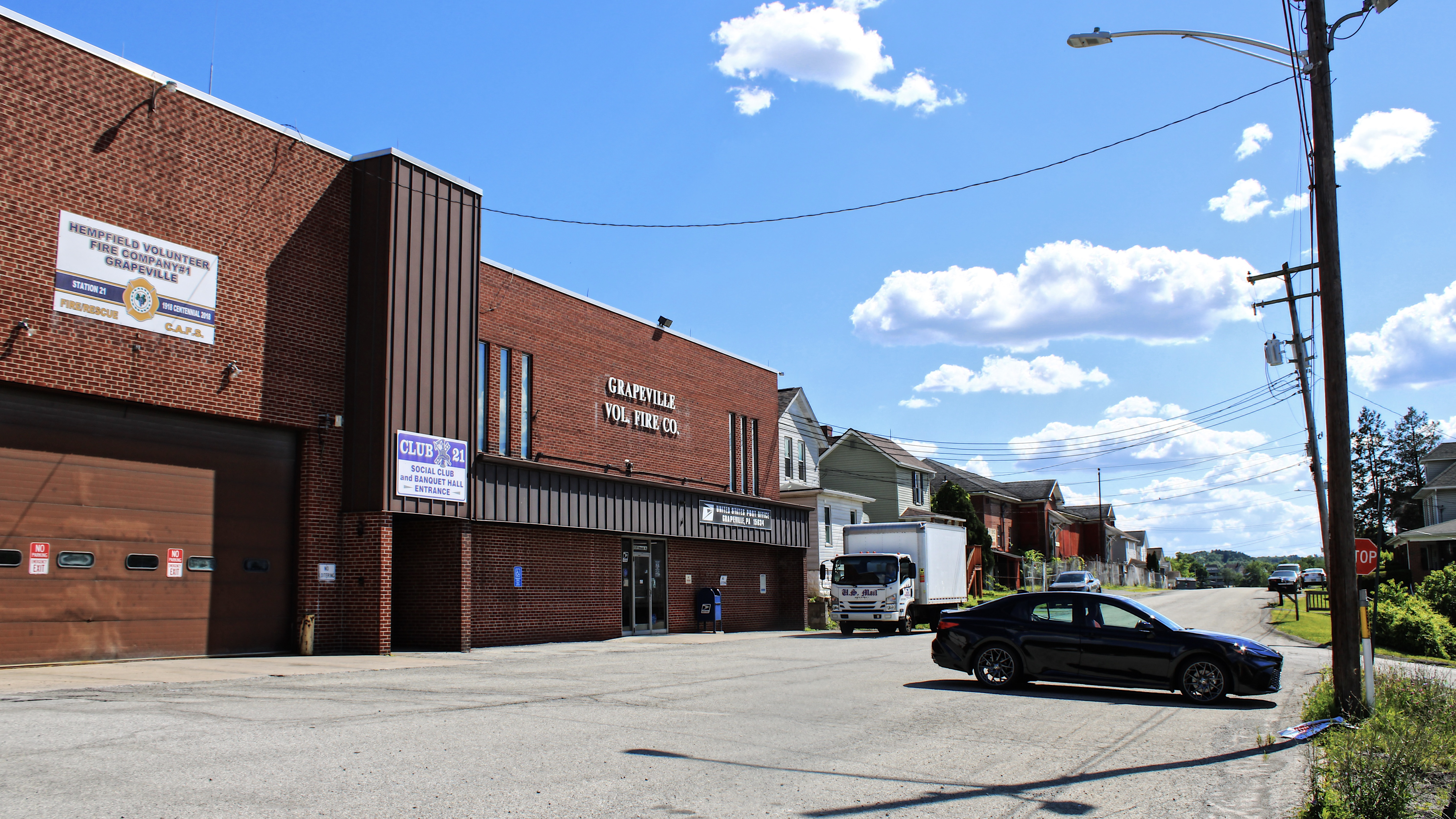
- Newark Street

- Location within the U.S. state of Pennsylvania Grapeville (the United States)
- Coordinates: 40°19′29″N 79°36′25″W
- Country: United States
- State: Pennsylvania
- County: Westmoreland

Area
  - Total: 0.13 sq mi (0.33 km^{2})
  - Land: 0.13 sq mi (0.33 km^{2})
  - Water: 0 sq mi (0.00 km^{2})

Population (2020)
  - Total: 499
  - Density: 3,944.3/sq mi (1,522.92/km^{2})
- Time zone: UTC-5 (Eastern (EST))
  - Summer (DST): UTC-4 (EDT)
- FIPS code: 42-30512

Grapeville is a census-designated place (CDP) in Hempfield Township, Westmoreland County, Pennsylvania, United States. The population was 676 at the time of the 2000 census.

== Geography ==
Grapeville is located at 40°19′29″N 79°36′25″W (40.324588, -79.606937).

According to the United States Census Bureau, the CDP has a total area of 0.1 square miles (0.26 km^{2}), all of it land.

== Demographics ==
Historical population
Census	Pop.	Note	%±
2020	499		—
U.S. Decennial Census

At the time of the 2000 census there were 676 people, 260 households, and 187 families living in the CDP.

The population density was 5,160.6 inhabitants per square mile (1,992.5/km^{2}). There were 277 housing units at an average density of 2,114.6 per square mile (816.5/km^{2}).

The racial makeup of the CDP was 98.96% White, 0.15% African American, 0.15% Asian, 0.30% from other races, and 0.44% from two or more races.

Of the 260 households 30.8% had children under the age of eighteen living with them, 54.6% were married couples living together, 12.3% had a female householder with no husband present, and 27.7% were non-families. 22.7% of households were one person and 13.1% had one person who was aged sixty-five or older.

The average household size was 2.60 and the average family size was 3.08.

The age distribution was 23.7% under the age of eighteen, 9.2% from eighteen to twenty-four, 29.6% from twenty-five to forty-four, 22.5% from forty-five to sixty-four, and 15.1% who were aged sixty-five or older. The median age was thirty-eight years.

For every one hundred females, there were 80.3 males. For every one hundred females who were aged eighteen or older, there were 82.3 males.

The median household income was $29,886 and the median family income was $33,438. Males had a median income of $32,083 compared with that of $18,661 for females.

The per capita income for the CDP was $10,824.

Roughly 8.1% of families and 12.9% of the population were living below the poverty line, including 28.3% of those who were under the age of eighteen. No one who was aged sixty-five or older was living in poverty.
