= Southwest Greensburg, Pennsylvania =

Borough in Pennsylvania, US

- Borough
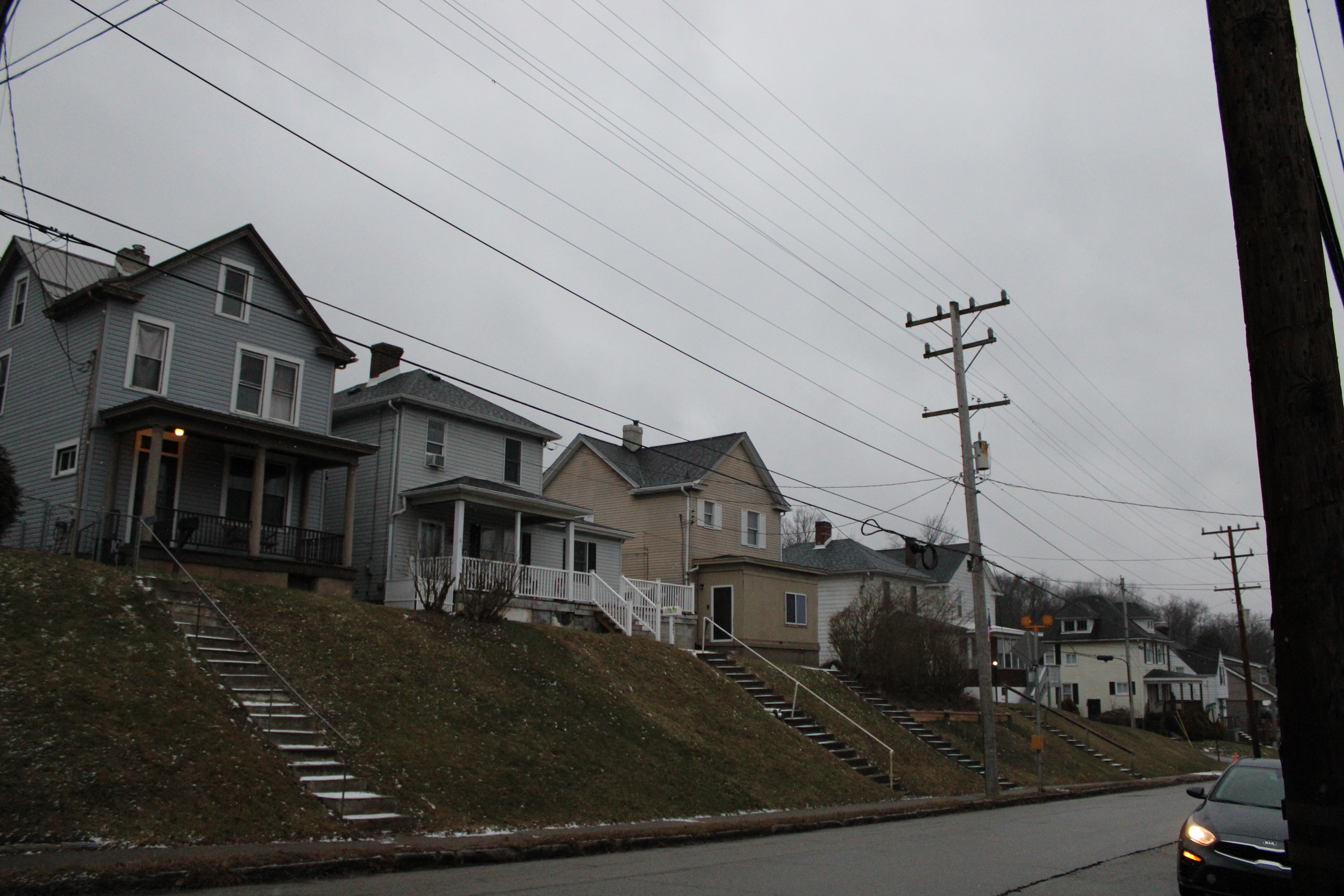
- Highland Avenue in Southwest Greensburg

- Location of Southwest Greensburg in Westmoreland County, Pennsylvania.

- Location within Pennsylvania
- Coordinates: 40°17′36″N 79°32′55″W
- Country: United States
- State: Pennsylvania
- County: Westmoreland
- Settled: 1769
- Incorporated: 1890

Government
  - Type: Borough Council

Area
  - Total: 0.39 sq mi (1.01 km^{2})
  - Land: 0.39 sq mi (1.01 km^{2})
  - Water: 0 sq mi (0.00 km^{2})
- Elevation: 1,089 ft (332 m)

Population (2010)
  - Total: 2,155
  - Estimate (2019): 2,018
  - Density: 5,150.7/sq mi (1,988.69/km^{2})
- Time zone: UTC-5 (Eastern (EST))
  - Summer (DST): UTC-4 (EDT)
- Zip code: 15601
- Area code: 724
- FIPS code: 42-72616
- Website: https://www.swgreensburg.org/

Southwest Greensburg is a borough in Westmoreland County, Pennsylvania, United States. As of the 2020 census, Southwest Greensburg had a population of 2,219.

== History ==
In 1769, John Peter Miller was granted provisional ownership of land within the current-day boundaries of Southwest Greensburg, and he received full ownership rights in 1789. Miller was told that the first settler traditionally has the right to name a community, and when Miller was asked what name he preferred for the area, he responded with "What you please?" As a result, the community - at that point a mere collection of farms - bore the unusual name "What You Please?" for many decades, in what was undoubtedly an expression of settlers' sense of humor.

In 1887, Richard Coulter and George Franklin Huff, both of whom had attained wealth in the local coal industry, saw the possibilities of developing the area as a residential community. Coulter and Huff purchased land from a farmer, John Mace, in 1887, and a community consisting of 413 lots was laid out. The first recorded use of the name "Southwest Greensburg" occurred in 1888, when Coulter and Huff's plan was submitted to the county courthouse.

Southwest Greensburg was incorporated as a borough on November 15, 1890. The first borough election was held on February 17, 1891, in which John Putnam was elected as the borough's first burgess (mayor), together with other borough officials.

The Greensburg and Hempfield Electric Street Railway Service was a key driver of the community's development. In 1890 it built a trolley line on Greene Street, connecting to Hunker and other lines. Shortly afterward, the company built an amusement park called "Electric Park" to increase trolley traffic. The boundaries of "Electric Park" were (approximately) Greene Street, Main Street, Welty Street, and Weaver Street. Nothing of "Electric Park" remains, which was eventually redeveloped as residential lots. The trolley line was later acquired by West Penn Railways and operated until January 3, 1937.

== Geography ==
Southwest Greensburg is located at 40°17′36″N 79°32′55″W.

According to the United States Census Bureau, the borough has a total area of 0.4 square mile (1.0 km^{2}), all land.

== Demographics ==
Historical population
Census	Pop.	Note	%±
1900	831		—
1910	2,127		156.0%
1920	2,538		19.3%
1930	3,105		22.3%
1940	3,002		−3.3%
1950	3,144		4.7%
1960	3,264		3.8%
1970	3,186		−2.4%
1980	2,898		−9.0%
1990	2,456		−15.3%
2000	2,398		−2.4%
2010	2,155		−10.1%
2020	2,219		3.0%

As of the census of 2000, there were 2,398 people, 1,097 households, and 645 families residing in the borough. The population density was 6,001.9 inhabitants per square mile (2,317.3/km^{2}). There were 1,187 housing units at an average density of 2,970.9 per square mile (1,147.1/km^{2}). The racial makeup of the borough was 96.62% White, 1.75% African American, 0.13% Native American, 0.17% Asian, 0.04% Pacific Islander, 0.38% from other races, and 0.92% from two or more races. Hispanic or Latino of any race were 0.46% of the population. There were 1,097 households, of which 24.2% had children under 18 living with them, 44.2% were married couples living together, 11.9% had a female householder with no husband present, and 41.2% were non-families. 36.0% of all households were made up of individuals, and 14.3% had someone who was 65 years of age or older living alone. The average household size was 2.19, and the average family size was 2.85.

The borough's population was spread out, with 21.1% under 18, 7.4% from 18 to 24, 32.2% from 25 to 44, 22.1% from 45 to 64, and 17.2% who were 65 years of age or older. The median age was 39 years. For every 100 females, there were 89.4 males. For every 100 females aged 18 and over, there were 85.8 males.

The median income for a household in the borough was $35,750, and the median income for a family was $43,929. Males had a median income of $31,219 versus $24,613 for females. The per capita income for the borough was $18,281. About 5.8% of families and 6.8% of the population were below the poverty line, including 7.1% of those under age 18 and 9.4% of those aged 65 or over.

== Local government ==
On August 13, 2018, Carol Palcic was appointed mayor by the borough's council after the previous mayor resigned to become Southwest Greensburg's first female mayor.

In May 2020, Southwest Greensburg councilor David Thomas came under fire for hurling and screaming racial slurs after an incident with his dog.
