= South Greensburg, Pennsylvania =

Borough in Pennsylvania, US

- Borough
- South Main Street as seen from Route 30

- Location of South Greensburg in Westmoreland County, Pennsylvania.

- Location within Pennsylvania
- Coordinates: 40°16′38″N 79°32′55″W
- Country: United States
- State: Pennsylvania
- County: Westmoreland
- Settled: 1780
- Incorporated: 1891

Government
  - Type: Borough Council

Area
  - Total: 0.71 sq mi (1.83 km^{2})
  - Land: 0.71 sq mi (1.83 km^{2})
  - Water: 0 sq mi (0.00 km^{2})
- Elevation: 1,073 ft (327 m)

Population (2010)
  - Total: 2,117
  - Estimate (2019): 1,996
  - Density: 2,823.6/sq mi (1,090.18/km^{2})
- Time zone: UTC-5 (Eastern (EST))
  - Summer (DST): UTC-4 (EDT)
- Zip code: 15601
- Area code: 724
- FIPS code: 42-72192
- Website: www.southgreensburg.org

South Greensburg is a borough in Westmoreland County, Pennsylvania, United States. As of the 2020 census, South Greensburg had a population of 2,135.

== History ==
=== Early history ===
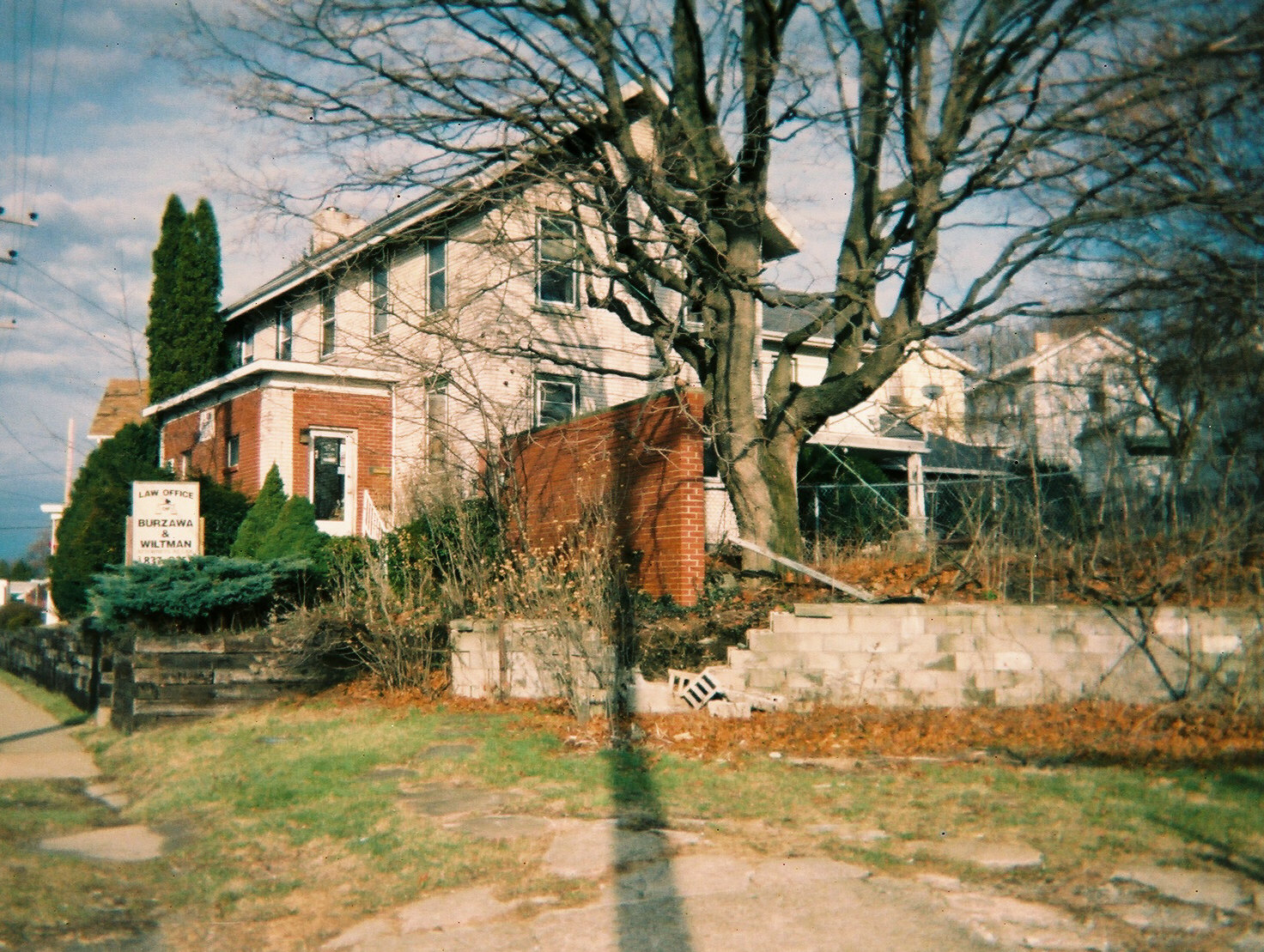
The borough's oldest structure: The Rugh House at 1213 Broad Street

In 1780, Michael Rugh acquired title to 229.25 acres (0.9277 km^{2}), which he operated as a farm. The land was passed on to his son, Jacob Rugh, and later to Jacob's son, Peter Rugh. The Rugh family house is still extant at 1213 Broad Street. The current building dates from the Civil War, but was built on the foundation of a much older structure. The area was known as Rughtown, although it was not yet a town in any meaningful sense.

In the 1870s, a local industrialist, George Franklin Huff, bought 189 acres (0.76 km^{2}) of the Rugh farm. In 1881, this was sold to Greensburg Coal and Coke Company (later Keystone Coal and Coke Company), which established a mine and brickyard along Broad Street. Fifty workers' houses were built in 1888. During this time, the community was known as Huff, Hufftown, or, Pennsylvania Huff's Station.

A trolley line was constructed in 1890 along Broad Street, running north into Greensburg. This line was later acquired by West Penn Railways, which operated trolley service until 1952.

In 1891, the community was incorporated as the Borough of South Greensburg.

=== Coal strike of 1910-1911 ===
The borough was the scene of violence during the Westmoreland County Coal Strike of 1910–1911. In July 1910, a group of striking coal miners were authorized to conduct a protest by the borough's Chief of Police, William B. Keltz. A confrontation ensued between the marchers and security personnel working for Jamison Coal and Coke Company. In the resulting melee, one miner, Peter Gale, was shot by J.A. Willis, who was a member of the company's security forces. Chief Keltz attempted to arrest the shooter and instead was arrested himself by constables under Jamison's control.

=== Walworth Valves ===
For nearly a century, South Greensburg's largest employer was Walworth Valves. This factory began in 1888, as the Kelly & Jones Company (John T. Kelly and George M. Jones), and Huff was a member of their board of directors. Walworth Company purchased the facility in 1925. The factory filled a large plot of land bordered by (using current street names) Route 30 Bypass, South Main Street, Huff Avenue, and the railroad. Including adjacent properties used by the company, this industrial complex covered 31 acres (0.13 km^{2}) and had 1500 employees at its height. The factory closed in 1980 and was later demolished. The site is now occupied by the Wellington Square office building and various commercial businesses.

== Geography ==
South Greensburg is located at 40°16′38″N 79°32′55″W (40.277309, -79.548663).

According to the United States Census Bureau, the borough has a total area of 0.7 square mile (1.9 km^{2}), all land.

== Demographics ==
Historical population
Census	Pop.	Note	%±
1900	700		—
1910	1,748		149.7%
1920	2,188		25.2%
1930	2,520		15.2%
1940	2,616		3.8%
1950	2,980		13.9%
1960	3,058		2.6%
1970	3,288		7.5%
1980	2,605		−20.8%
1990	2,293		−12.0%
2000	2,280		−0.6%
2010	2,117		−7.1%
2020	2,135		0.9%

As of the census of 2000, there were 2,280 people, 1,048 households, and 630 families residing in the borough. The population density was 3,087.0 inhabitants per square mile (1,191.9/km^{2}). There were 1,129 housing units at an average density of 1,528.6 per square mile (590.2/km^{2}). The racial makeup of the borough was 98.25% White, 0.66% African American, 0.04% Native American, 0.09% Asian, 0.31% from other races, and 0.66% from two or more races. Hispanic or Latino of any race were 0.53% of the population.

There were 1,048 households, out of which 22.7% had children under the age of 18 living with them, 49.3% were married couples living together, 7.3% had a female householder with no husband present, and 39.8% were non-families. 35.8% of all households were made up of individuals, and 18.7% had someone living alone who was 65 years of age or older. The average household size was 2.17 and the average family size was 2.83.

In the borough the population was spread out, with 18.1% under the age of 18, 6.1% from 18 to 24, 29.8% from 25 to 44, 24.4% from 45 to 64, and 21.5% who were 65 years of age or older. The median age was 43 years. For every 100 females, there were 87.8 males. For every 100 females age 18 and over, there were 83.0 males.

The median income for a household in the borough was $32,540, and the median income for a family was $47,607. Males had a median income of $32,097 versus $25,896 for females. The per capita income for the borough was $17,910. About 2.7% of families and 5.1% of the population were below the poverty line, including 6.0% of those under age 18 and 5.1% of those age 65 or over.
