= Those Winter Sundays =

Poem

- by Robert Hayden
- Written: 1962
- Country: United States
- Language: English
- Subject(s): Family and personal relationships
- Genre: Poetry
- Form: Three stanzas
- Publication date: 1966
- Lines: 14

"Those Winter Sundays" is a poem written in 1962 by American Robert Hayden (1913–1980), while he was teaching as an English professor at Fisk University. The poem is one of Hayden's most recognized works, together with "Middle Passage".

The poem is about the father/son relationship – recalling the poet's memories of his father, realizing that despite the distance between them there was a kind of love, real and intangible, shown by the father's efforts to improve his son's life, rather than by gifts or demonstrative affection. The author's words suggest that the son feels remorse that he failed to recognise this in his father's lifetime.

== History ==
=== Authorship history ===
Robert Hayden was born on August 4, 1913, and was brought up in a poor neighborhood by his foster parents, Sue Ellen Westerfield and William Hayden. His life with his foster parents was tumultuous with frequent bouts of verbal and physical violence. He was the first African American to be named as Consultant in Poetry to the Library of Congress (Poet Laureate). He is famous for writing about cultural themes and African American history. He died on February 25, 1980, at the age of 66.

=== Background ===
"Those Winter Sundays" is about Robert Hayden's boyhood. Robert grew up in a difficult environment, surrounded by fights and poverty, and due to these facts he didn't appreciate his foster parents' love as he should have. Through mental maturity, he regretfully learned that he neither knew nor appreciated the sacrifices that his parents and, generally, every parent makes out of parental love.

=== Publishing history ===
The first, original version of the poem, which was slightly different from the definitive version, was published in Hayden's A Ballad of Remembrance (1962). The common version is part of the book called Collected Poems by Robert Hayden, edited by Frederick Glaysher.

In 1997, the poem was ranked in a Columbia University Press survey as the 266th most anthologized poem in English.

== Title ==
The author wants the title to imply a sense of old age and exhausted behaviour. He is reminding us about those cold and dark Sundays during his youth. The poem is featured by a presence of alliteration and a narrative of many similar Sundays that seemed an enormous obstacle. Even if this poem is characterised by a mundane and unhappy moment of the author's life, he remembers these memories because of their unique "coldness" and "silence".

== Themes and symbols ==
The main focus of this poem is the love of parents for their children, but this kind of love can be easily misunderstood by the latter, as it isn't about being kind and saying lovely words but instead are all the sacrifices that parents do; for instance, as it is implied in the poem, keeping the house warm and polishing the "good shoes".

"When the rooms were warm, he’d call,
 and slowly I would rise and dress [...]"
"[...]who had driven out the cold
 and polished my good shoes as well."

The poem reflects how Hayden's perspective of his father's love has changed, and his understanding of it has actually gotten deeper as the years have gone by; eventually the speaker starts to appreciate the selflessness of parental actions, while feeling a sense of regret for not having ever thanked him for he has done.

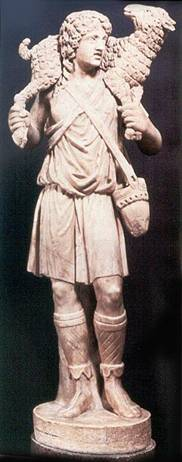
Statue of the Good Shepherd

The main symbol is temperature: Imageries such as "blueblack cold" make the reader aware of the cold temperature. However, soon in the poem, it becomes warm and words such as "fires blaze" enhance this image. The difference in temperature outside and inside the house reflects the author's relationship with his father. The image of cold also evokes solitude and emotional human distance.

"from labor in the weekday weather made
 banked fires blaze. No one ever thanked him."

A small part of the poem is stated above, this summarises the main idea of the poem itself: the father works to keep the family safe and warm without expecting appreciation for it.

Another symbol found in the poem is the symbol of the "good shoes". As the titles reminds the readers, it is a Sunday, a religious day. This shows how the father cares about his appearance like he cares about protecting his family. The author tells the readers that his father had "driven out the cold", an image which evokes a shepherd's behaviour with his herd. This can be linked to the idea of the Good Shepherd, thus creating a biblical reference.

== Analysis ==
"Those Winter Sundays" contains 14 lines in 3 stanza. This makes it look like a typical Sonnet even though it isn't, it neither has a rhyme nor a regular iambic pentameter. The first line does not have a metrical pattern. In comparison, the second line is in a metrical pattern. Both lines are 10 syllables long. The third line is much shorter, and it does not have a rhyme. There is a repetition in line 13 "What did I know". Those Winter Sundays is a poem of discovery and definition. For example, it discovered the synchronicity of sound between certain words that remind the theme of reconciliation while reading it. Listening to the repetitive sound of the letter "K" in words like blueblack, cracked, ached, weekday, the reader can draw a melodic map of how to read the entire poem, connecting the fire, the season, the fire, and the son.

Hayden also uses a metaphor, using the image of his father building the fire, that suggests the speaker finally discovered his father's love which he thought it never existed before. The speaker ends the poem with a rhetorical question by which he realizes his father's love towards him. This question changes the tone of the poem from nostalgic to regretful.

== Popular culture ==
- The poem was the subject of the third episode of the first season of Poetry in America with Elisa New (2018–), which first aired on April 1, 2018. The program featured then former Vice President of the United States Joe Biden, as well as the renowned poets Elizabeth Alexander and Angela Duckworth. This shows the international recognition of the work, and how it has the power to make readers travel to different eras in time, such as when industries were the main economic forces in 1960s America.
- In 2009, Hayden's poem was included in the Poetry Foundation's DC Poetry Tour, a multimedia tour of Washington DC under leads poets point of view, through a collaboration lived in a fully way.
- "Those Winter Sundays" was one of the poems which were celebrated at the Black History Month 2018 in February. It was celebrated with poems, podcasts and articles which are dealing with the African American history.

== Bibliography ==
1. Laurence Goldstein, Robert Chrisman: Robert Hayden: Essays on the Poetry published by University of Michigan Press, United States (2001). JSTOR, www.jstor.org/stable/10.3998/mpub.17204. ISBN 978-0-472-12040-6.
2. Robert Hayden: Collected Poems of Robert Hayden published by Liveright Publishing Corporation, edited by Frederick Glaysher (2013). http://books.wwnorton.com/books/978-0-87140-679-8/. ISBN 978-0-87140-679-8.
3. Gallagher, Ann M.: Hayden's 'Those Winter Sundays.'(Robert Hayden), Published by Taylor & Francis Ltd., The Explicator, v51, no.n4, 1993 Summer, p245(3). https://trove.nla.gov.au/work/58455012?q&versionId=71463131. ISSN 0014-4940
4. Cengage Learning Gale: A Study Guide for Robert E. Hayden's "Those Winter Sundays" published by Gale, Study Guides, 2017. https://books.google.it/books/about/A_Study_Guide_for_Robert_E_Hayden_s_Thos.html?id=J3s_swEACAAJ&source=kp_book_description&redir_esc=y. ISBN 9781375394772
5. Robert Hayden: Angle of Ascent: New and Selected Poems published by Liveright Publishing Corporation, November 17, 1975 (first published January 1, 1975). http://books.wwnorton.com/books/Angle-of-Ascent/ ISBN 978-0-87140-106-9
