= Christ's Church (Greensburg, Pennsylvania) =

Historic Anglican church in Greensburg, Pennsylvania, United States

Coordinates: 40°18′18″N 79°32′41″W

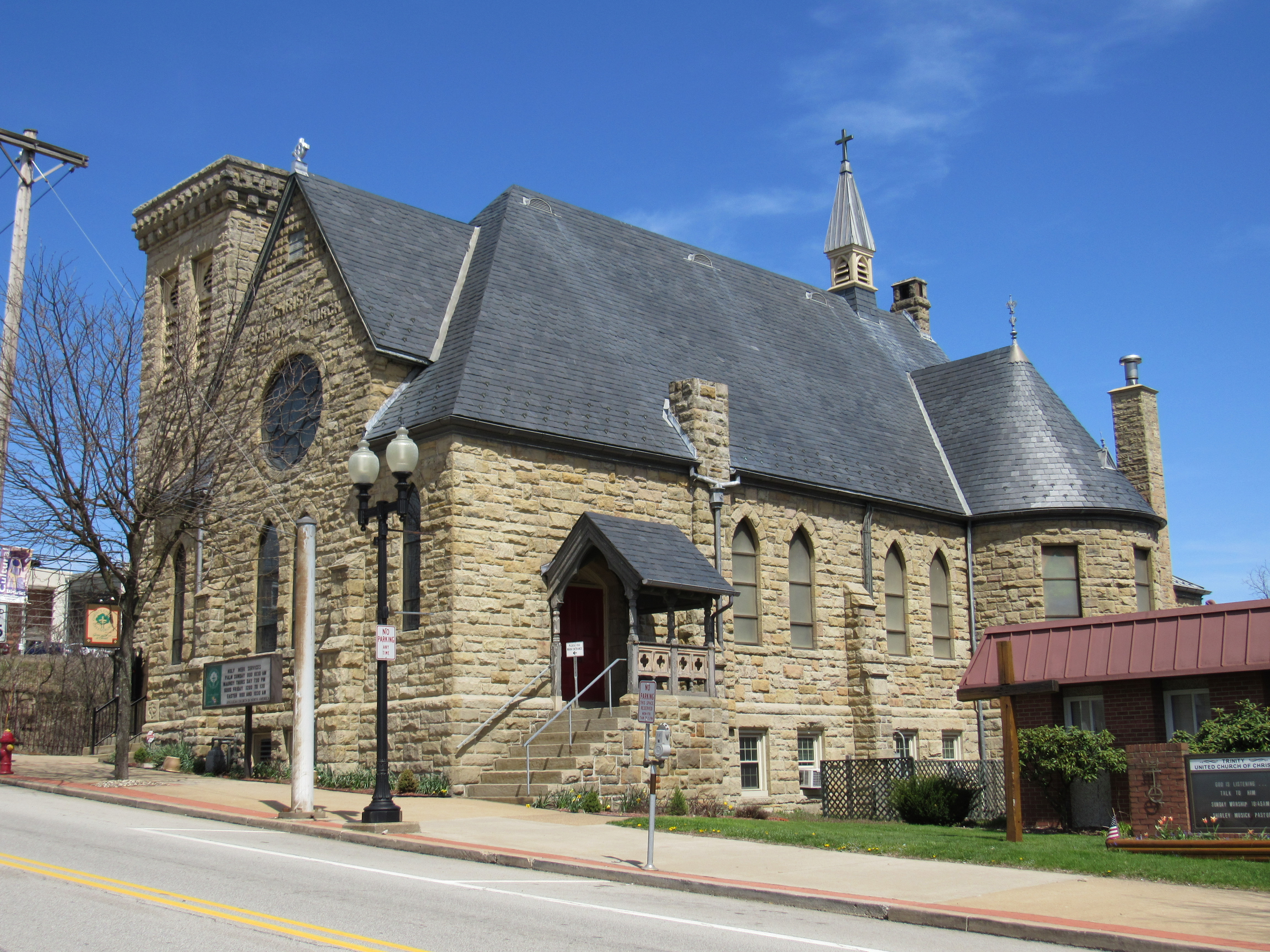
- Location: 145 North Main Street, Greensburg, Pennsylvania
- Country: United States
- Denomination: Anglican Church in North America
- Website: www.ccagbg.org

History
- Founded: 1822
- Dedicated: 1891

Architecture
- Style: Gothic Revival
- Years built: 1889–1891

Administration
- Diocese: Pittsburgh

Clergy
- Rector: The Rev. Jeff Wylie
- Christ's Church
- U.S. Historic district – Contributing property
- Part of: Greensburg Downtown Historic District (ID95000884)
- Added to NRHP: July 21, 1995

Christ's Church is a historic Anglican church in Greensburg, Pennsylvania. Founded in 1822 and completed in 1891, the church is a contributing property to the Greensburg Downtown Historic District.

== History ==
The first Anglican church services in Greensburg were held in September 1813 at the Westmoreland County court house, with missionary priests from the Society for the Advancement of Christianity in Pennsylvania as celebrants. From 1814 to 1822, the Rev. Moses Bennett traveled into the region to hold services. In December 1822, a charter for the parish was signed, then granted by the Pennsylvania General Assembly in 1823 under the name "Christ's Church," and Bennett became the first rector, serving until 1824.

The first building of Christ's Church was erected in 1823. In 1854, the second church was built at its present-day location on Main Street to a design by priest-architect John Henry Hopkins. In 1889, the church had become too small and was demolished. The congregation met in the nearby Masonic Temple during the construction of the third and present-day Gothic Revival church, which was completed and dedicated in December 1891.

In 2008, as part of the Anglican realignment, Christ Church joined the majority of the Episcopal Diocese of Pittsburgh in disassociating from the Episcopal Church and forming the Anglican Diocese of Pittsburgh under Bishop Robert Duncan. (As part of the departure, the church revised its articles of incorporation to reflect its legal name of "Christ's Church" after being commonly known as "Christ Episcopal Church.") “[I]t’s a matter of authority,” Rector Jeff Wylie said of the split in 2022. “We find things in scripture, and through scripture is how we progress. We don’t find society and try to make it fit into scripture. That doesn’t mean we’re any less respectful, any less loving. We accept people from where they are. There’s a difference between accepting somebody and endorsing behavior.”

In March 2018, Christ's Church and eight other congregations in the Anglican Diocese of Pittsburgh reached a settlement over property ownership with the Episcopal Church. Under the settlement, Christ's Church retained legal title to its property. But to reflect the Episcopal diocese's "trust beneficiary rights" in the properties, Christ's Church agreed to pay an annual fee amounting to 3.25 percent of its operating revenues to the diocese for the first 20 years after the agreement, followed by an annual fee of 1.75 percent of its operating revenues in subsequent years.

Christ's Church marked its 200th anniversary in 2022 with events, tours and a documentary made in conjunction with the Westmoreland Historical Society.

== Architecture ==
Christ's Church was built in an early English Gothic style to a cruciform plan of local sandstone. The church, which seats 225, is 96 feet long and measures 60 feet across the transept. Like many other buildings made with porous stone in southwestern Pennsylvania, the walls became black from coal soot in the 20th century, but have since been cleaned and restored to their original condition. The bell in the square tower dates to the second church.

Inside the church, the ceiling is red oak, supported by beams resting on stone corbels carved as female heads. The 20 stained glass windows portray scenes from the life of Jesus Christ. Three of them were originally donated by Caleb Cope of Philadelphia for use in the 1853 building and transferred after construction of the 1891 building. One window, dating to 1914, is a portrayal of Jesus as the Good Shepherd produced by Louis Comfort Tiffany's studio.

Christ's Church also uses a Christian education and an administrative office building behind the main church on North Maple Avenue.

== Notable members and clergy ==
- Edward Y. Buchanan (rector, 1832–1833), brother of President James Buchanan
- Anne Eliza Foster Buchanan, wife of Edward Y. Buchanan and brother of Stephen Foster
- John Latta, first lieutenant governor of Pennsylvania
- Henry C. Potter (rector, 1857–1859), future bishop of New York
