= Westmoreland County Courthouse =

- U.S. National Register of Historic Places
- U.S. Historic district – Contributing property
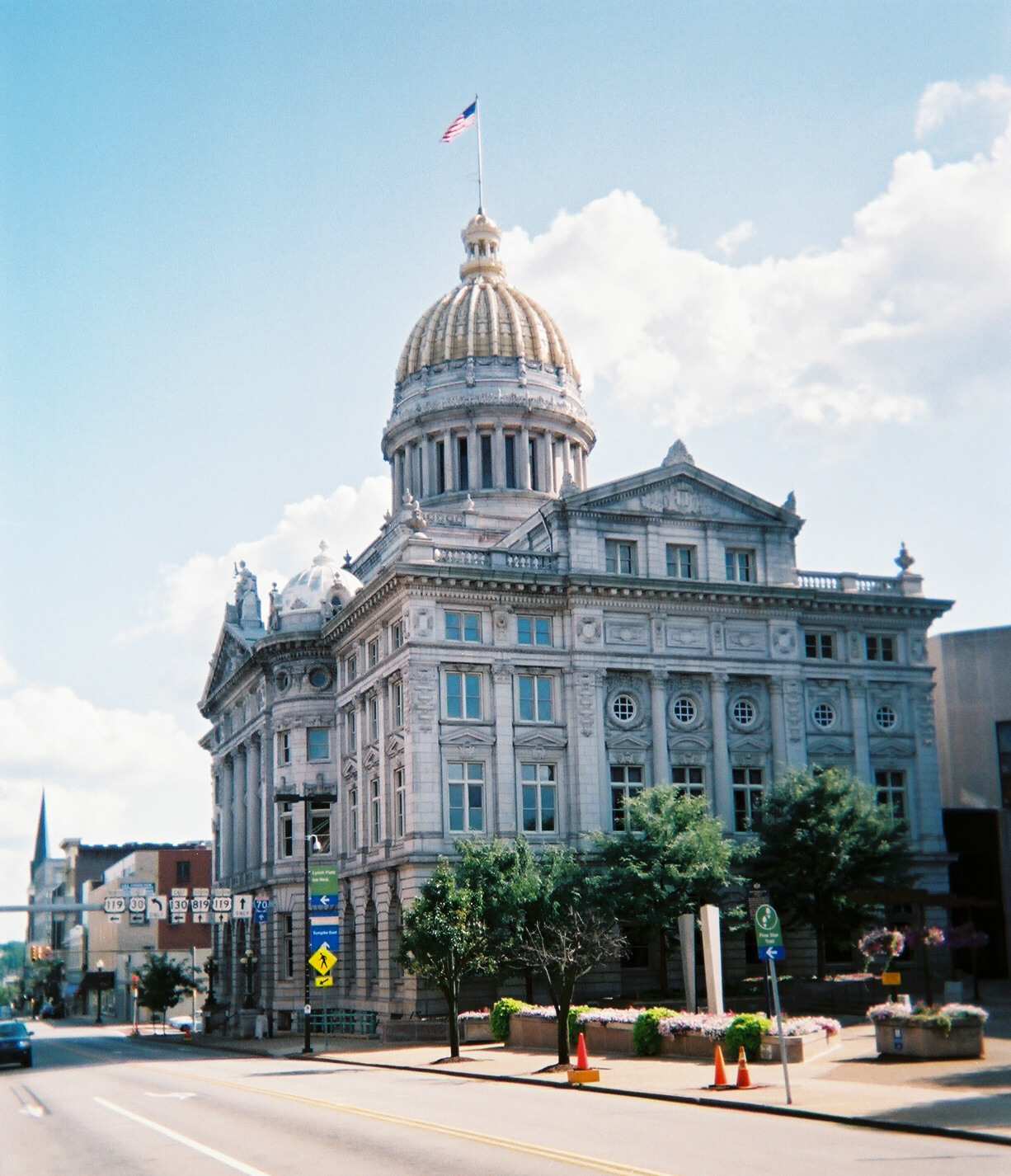
- Street view of the courthouse

- Location within Pennsylvania Location within the United States
- Location: 2 N. Main St., Greensburg, Pennsylvania
- Coordinates: 40.302645°N 79.544636°W
- Area: 0.5 acres (0.20 ha)
- Built: 1906
- Architect: William Kauffman
- Architectural style: Beaux Arts
- Part of: Downtown Greensburg Historic District (ID95000884)
- NRHP reference No.: 78002485
- Added to NRHP: March 30, 1978

The Westmoreland County Courthouse is a government building of Westmoreland County located in the county seat, Greensburg, Pennsylvania. It is a contributing property to the Downtown Greensburg Historic District, but was listed separately on the National Register of Historic Places on March 30, 1978. The courthouse is also one of the tallest structures in Greensburg, standing 175 feet (53 m) above street level.

== History ==
The current building, the county's fourth courthouse, was constructed in 1906. The first courthouse was in use from 1787 to 1801. The second courthouse was demolished in 1854, and the third in 1901. The fourth courthouse was designed in a Beaux Arts style by William S. Kaufman.

== See also ==
- National Register of Historic Places listings in Westmoreland County, Pennsylvania
- List of state and county courthouses in Pennsylvania
