= Robert Hayden =

American poet and academic (1913–1980)

- Born: Asa Bundy Sheffey; August 4, 1913; Detroit, Michigan, U.S.
- Died: February 25, 1980 (aged 66); Ann Arbor, Michigan, U.S.
- Resting place: Fairview cemetery, Sec 17, Ann Arbor, Michigan, U.S.
- Education: Detroit City College (no degree); University of Michigan (MA)
- Occupations: Poet, essayist and educator
- Spouse: Erma Morris

Robert Hayden (August 4, 1913 – February 25, 1980) was an American poet, essayist, and educator. He served as Consultant in Poetry to the Library of Congress from 1976 to 1978, a role today known as U.S. Poet Laureate. He was the first African-American writer to hold the office.

== Biography ==
Robert Hayden was born in Detroit, Michigan, to Ruth and Asa Sheffey, who separated before his birth. He was taken in by a foster family next door, Sue Ellen Westerfield and William Hayden, and grew up in the Detroit neighborhood of Paradise Valley.

His childhood traumas resulted in debilitating bouts of depression that he later called "my dark nights of the soul". Because he was nearsighted and slight of stature, he was often ostracized by his peers. In response, Hayden read voraciously, developing both an ear and an eye for transformative qualities in literature. He attended Detroit City College (later called Wayne State University) with a major in Spanish and minor in English and left in 1936 during the Great Depression, one credit short of finishing his degree, to go to work for the Works Progress Administration Federal Writers' Project, where he researched black history and folk culture.

Leaving the Federal Writers' Project in 1938, Hayden married Erma Morris in 1940 and published his first volume, Heart-Shape in the Dust (1940). He enrolled at the University of Michigan in 1941 and won a Hopwood Award there. Raised as a Baptist, he followed his wife into the Bahá'í Faith during the early 1940s, and raised a daughter, Maia, in the religion. Hayden became one of the best-known Bahá'í poets. Erma Hayden was a pianist and composer and served as supervisor of music for Nashville public schools.

In pursuit of a master's degree, Hayden studied under W. H. Auden, who directed his attention to issues of poetic form, technique, and artistic discipline. Auden's influence may be seen in the "technical pith of Hayden's verse". After finishing his degree in 1942, then teaching several years at the University of Michigan, Hayden went to Fisk University in 1946, where he remained for 23 years, returning to the University of Michigan in 1969 to complete his teaching career (1969–80). Concurrent with his teaching responsibilities at Fisk, he served as poet-in-residence at Indiana State University in 1967 and visiting poet at the University of Washington in 1969, the University of Connecticut in 1971, Denison University in 1972, and Connecticut College in 1974.

As a supporter of his religion's teaching of the unity of humanity, Hayden could never embrace Black separatism. Thus, the title poem of Words in the Mourning Time ends in a stirring plea in the name of all humanity:

Reclaim now, now renew the vision of

a human world where godliness
is possible and man
is neither gook nigger honkey wop or kike
but man

permitted to be man.

He died in Ann Arbor, Michigan, on February 25, 1980, aged 66.

In 2012 the U.S. Postal Service issued a pane of stamps featuring ten great Twentieth Century American Poets, including Hayden.

== Career ==
By the 1960s and the rise of the Black Arts Movement, when a more youthful era of Afro-American artists composed politically and emotionally charged protest poetry overwhelmingly coordinated to a black audience, Hayden's philosophy about the function of poetry and the way he characterized himself as an author were settled. His refusal to revamp himself as indicated by the pictures of the 1960s earned him feedback from a few scholars and analysts. Hayden stayed consistent with his idea of poetry as an artistic frame instead of a polemical demonstration and to his conviction that poetry ought to, in addition to other things, address the qualities shared by mankind, including social injustice. Hayden's beliefs about the relationship of the artist to his poems likewise had an impact in his refusal to compose emotionally determined protest sonnets. Hayden's practice was to make separation between the speaker and the movement of the poem.

His work often addressed the plight of African Americans, usually using his former home of Paradise Valley slum as a backdrop, as he does in the poem "Heart-Shape in the Dust". He made ready use of black vernacular and folk speech, and he wrote political poetry as well, including a sequence on the Vietnam War.

On the first poem of the sequence, he said: "I was trying to convey the idea that the horrors of the war became a kind of presence, and they were with you in the most personal and intimate activity, having your meals and so on. Everything was touched by the horror and the brutality and criminality of war. I feel that's one of the best of the poems."

The impact of Euro-American innovation on Hayden's poetry and also his continuous assertions that he needed to be viewed as an "American poet" as opposed to a "black poet" prompted much feedback of him as an abstract "Uncle Tom" by Afro-American critics during the 1960s. However, Afro-American history, contemporary black figures, for example, Malcolm X, and Afro-American communities, especially Hayden's native Paradise Valley, were the subjects of a significant number of his poems.

On April 7, 1966, Hayden's Ballad of Remembrance was awarded, by unanimous vote, the Grand Prize for Poetry at the first World Festival of Negro Arts in Dakar, Senegal. The festival had more than ten thousand people from thirty-seven nations in attendance. However, on April 22, 1966, Hayden was denounced at a Fisk University conference of black writers by a group of young protest poets led by Melvin Tolson for refusing to identify himself as a black poet.

=== Nature poetry ===
Hayden is also known as a nature poet and is included in the anthology Black Nature: Four Centuries of African American Nature Poetry. His poem "A Plague of Starlings" is one of the more famous of his nature-based poems. The poem "Night-Blooming Cereus" is another example of Hayden's depiction of the natural world. The poem presents a series of haiku-like stanzas. Hayden said that he was inspired by a trip to Duluth, Minnesota during the smelt fishing season. He describes how the poem "[...]turned into a haiku, where you get it all by suggestion and implication".

=== Poetic influences ===
Robert Hayden has been praised for his work crafting poems, the unique perspectives in his work, his exact language, and his absolute command of traditional poetic techniques and structures. Hayden's influences included Elinor Wylie, Countee Cullen, Paul Laurence Dunbar, Langston Hughes, Arna Bontemps, John Keats, W. H. Auden and W. B. Yeats.

As he became a well-known poet, he influenced society in a way that enforced the many ideas that were created during the 1900s. Some of his influential poems are, "Angle of Ascent", "Elegies for Paradise Valley", "Night, Death, Mississippi", and "Those Winter Sundays".

=== Legacy ===
Although Robert Hayden is widely recognized as a prominent poet today, he did not achieve the same level of recognition during his lifetime. His work was often overlooked due to the racial discrimination and prejudice prevalent in the 20th century. However, in contemporary times, his poetry is highly regarded for its literary significance and contributions to social discourse.

Hayden was elected to the American Academy of Poets in 1975. His most famous poem is "Those Winter Sundays", which deals with the memory of fatherly love and loneliness. It ranks among the most anthologized American poems of the twentieth century. He declined the position later called United States Poet Laureate previously, accepted the appointment for 1976–1977 during America's Bicentennial, and again in 1977–1978 though his health was failing then. He was awarded successive honorary degrees by Brown University (1976) and Fisk, (1978). In 1977 he was interviewed for television in Los Angeles on At One With by Keith Berwick. In January 1980 Hayden was among those gathered to be honored by President Jimmy Carter and his wife at a White House reception celebrating American poetry. He served for a decade as an editor of the Bahá'í journal World Order.

Other famed poems include "The Whipping" (about a small boy being severely punished for some undetermined offense), "Middle Passage" (inspired by the events surrounding the United States v. The Amistad affair), "Runagate, Runagate", and "Frederick Douglass". Hayden died of heart failure on February 25, 1980, in Ann Arbor, MI.

== Bibliography ==
- Heart-Shape in the Dust. Detroit, MI: Falcon Press 1940.
- The Lion and the Archer: Poems. With Myron O'Higgins. Nashville: Counterpoise, 1948.
- A Ballad of Remembrance. London: Paul Breman, 1962.
- Selected Poems. NY: October House 1966.
- Words in the Mourning Time. NY: October House, 1970.
- The Night-Blooming Cereus. London: Paul Breman, 1972.
- Angle of Ascent: New and Selected Poems. NY: Liveright, 1975.
- American Journal. MA: Effendi Press, 1978.
- American Journal (expanded): NY: Liveright, 1982.
- Collected Prose: Robert Hayden. Ed. Frederick Glaysher. Ann Arbor: University of Michigan, 1984.
- Collected Poems: Robert Hayden. Ed. Frederick Glaysher. NY: Liveright, 1985.
