= Greensburg Downtown Historic District (Greensburg, Pennsylvania) =

Historic district in Pennsylvania, United States

- U.S. National Register of Historic Places
- U.S. Historic district
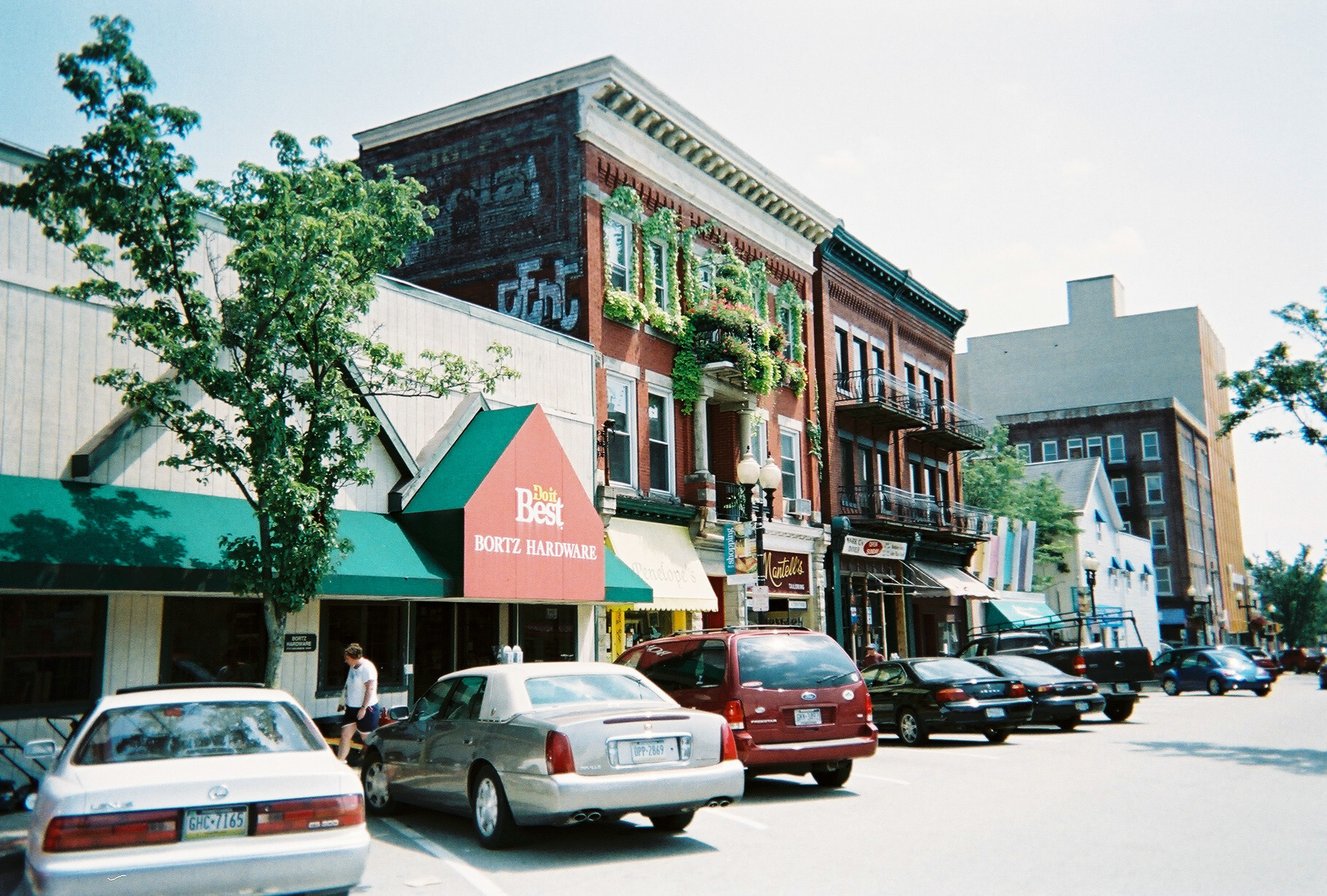
- Street scene on South Pennsylvania Avenue

- Location within Pennsylvania Location within the United States
- Location: Roughly bounded by Tunnel St., Main St., Third St., and Harrison Ave., Greensburg, Pennsylvania
- Coordinates: 40°18′11″N 79°32′42″W
- Area: 21.8 acres (8.8 ha)
- Architect: Cram, Ralph Adams; Cookman, William H., et al.
- Architectural style: Italianate, Romanesque, Classical Revival
- NRHP reference No.: 95000884
- Added to NRHP: July 21, 1995

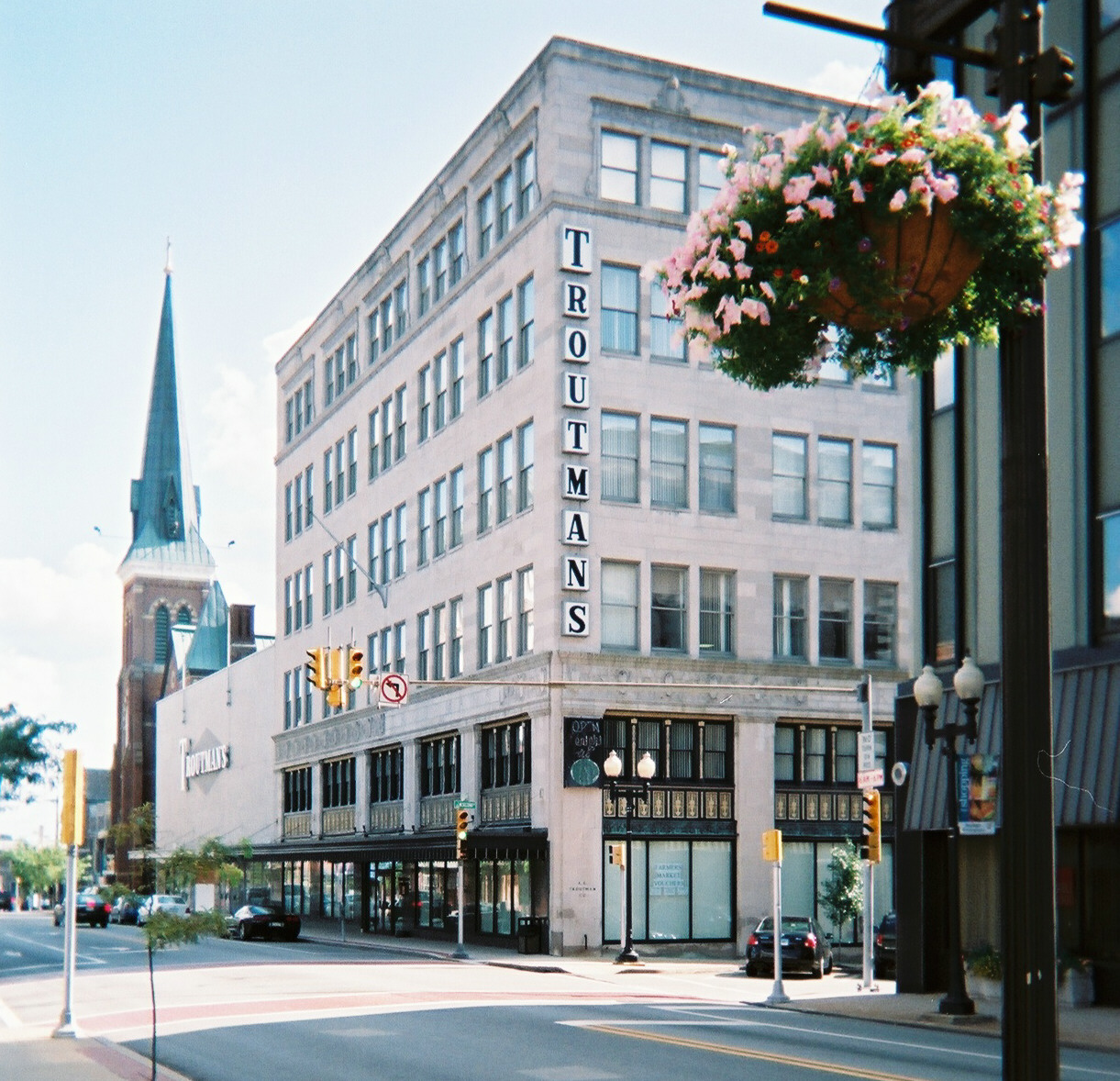
Troutman's Department Store (1923)

The Greensburg Downtown Historic District of Greensburg, Pennsylvania, is bounded approximately by Tunnel Street, Main Street, Third Street, and Harrison Avenue. It consists of 62 buildings on 21.8 acres (8.8 ha), with the most notable buildings from the years 1872-1930. The district's oldest structure (1872) is the former Masonic Temple at 132 South Main Street. The Academy Hill Historic District is directly to the north of downtown Greensburg.

Two places that are separately listed on the National Register, the Westmoreland County Courthouse and the Greensburg Railroad Station, are included in the district. The "dominant building" in the district is the courthouse.

Downtown Greensburg was once a significant retailing center, serving numerous small communities in central Westmoreland County. Not only was it an important station on the Pennsylvania Railroad, but it was also the headquarters of West Penn Railways, an interurban (long-distance trolley) company serving many small communities to the east and south of Greensburg. The headquarters building of West Penn Railways is still extant at 416 South Main Street, serving as City Hall, although it is outside the boundaries of the historic district. These forms of rail transportation contributed to Greensburg's growth in the pre-automobile era.

Greensburg's largest department store was Troutman's (202-226 South Main Street), the only downtown building with escalators. Other department stores included Royer's (114 South Main Street, demolished 2026), Sears (101 North Main Street), and J. C. Penney (221 South Main Street, demolished 2022), in a building previously used by Pollins' Grand Depot department store. The opening of Greengate Mall in 1965 (now demolished) had a devastating impact on downtown retailing, following the pattern that occurred in numerous communities. However, the presence of the courthouse continues to give purpose to downtown, and a significant number of historic properties remain.

== Notable buildings by street ==
=== Ehalt Street ===
Ehalt Street was named for Jacob Ehalt (1821–1885), a German immigrant who owned a hotel on Harrison Avenue.

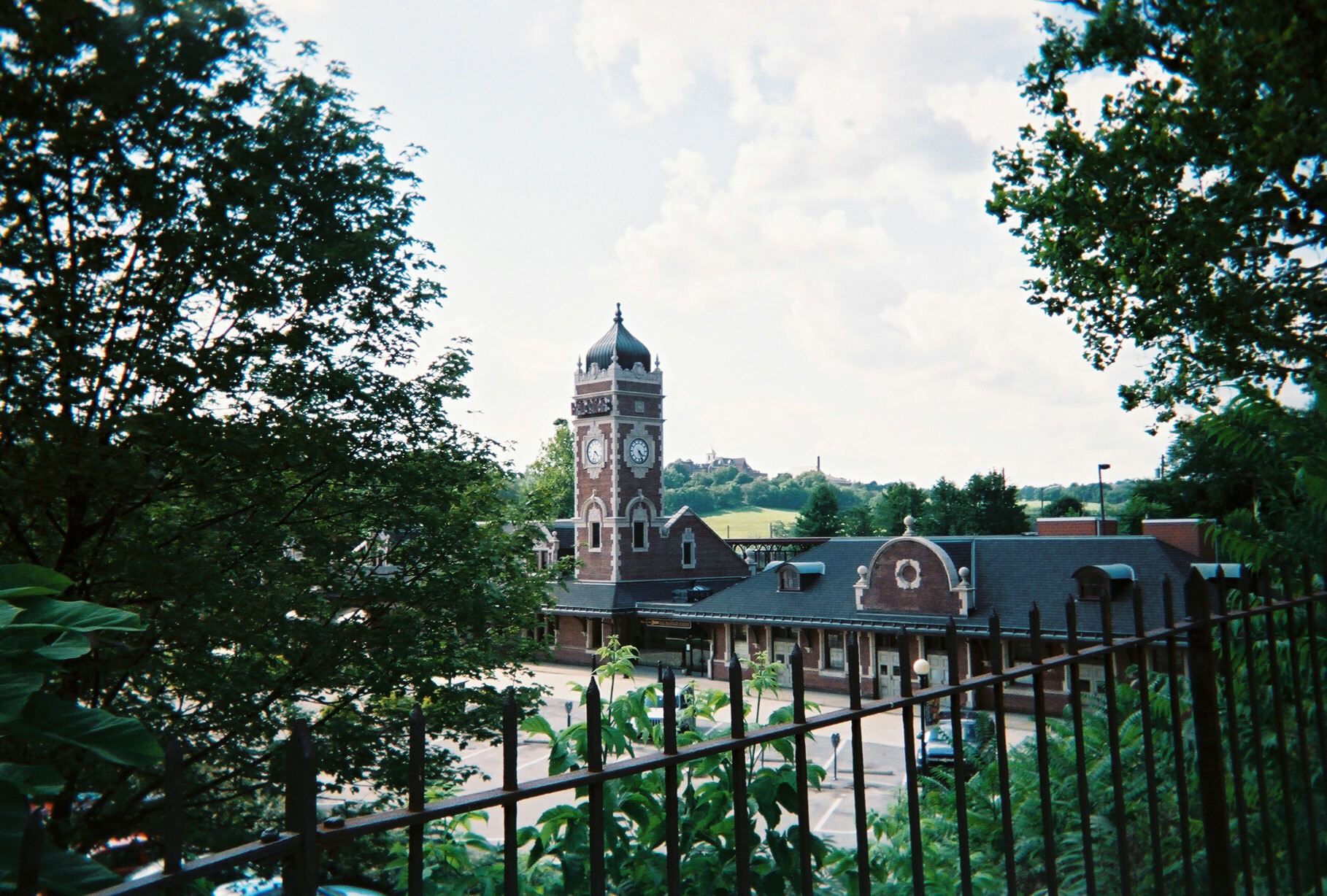
Train Station (1911)

- Greensburg Train Station (101 Ehalt Street, at the corner of Harrison Avenue) was designed by architect William Cookman for the Pennsylvania Railroad in a style that has been described as Jacobean Revival. The Pennsylvania Railroad initiated service to Greensburg in 1852, and a temporary structure served as a station for a few years. In 1860, a one-story red brick station was constructed. Passengers walked across the tracks to board westbound trains. In the early 1900s, the railroad was expanded from two tracks to four tracks. The tracks were elevated to create a more nearly level right-of-way for locomotives. These changes necessitated a new station, which is the current structure. When it opened in 1911, four active tracks passed by the station, and there were two passenger platforms, one serving two eastbound tracks and one serving two westbound tracks. The station is below the tracks, so passengers would walk through a pedestrian tunnel and then upstairs to one of the two platforms. Currently, only two tracks pass through the station, each served by a separate platform. Amtrak provides regular passenger train service. The old waiting room has been renovated for use as a restaurant, and the old baggage facility is currently rented as offices.

=== Harrison Avenue ===
Harrison Avenue was named for William Henry Harrison.

- Penn Towers (137 Harrison Avenue), formerly the Penn-Albert Hotel, opened in 1923 and is one of the city's tallest structures, now used as housing for senior citizens. Designed by Edward J. Nelson, it has a red brick facade and Georgian Revival details. The building has 8 to 11 floors, depending on whether particular mezzanine-type floors or half-floors are counted. From the main entrance on Harrison Avenue, the hotel patron would walk through a short arcade lined with shops and go up a half-flight of stairs to the lobby, which adjoined a restaurant. A ballroom ("Crystal Room") was on the mezzanine level, and at the very top, there was a roof garden for dancing and other events, initially open on the sides and later entirely enclosed. The two highest guestroom floors, marked by a decorative frieze on the facade, were initially used for suites designed for long-term occupancy. In the hotel's original name, "Penn" referred to William Penn, and "Albert" referred to the initial owner, John Albert Sheetz. An article in a 1923 magazine lists the types of room and their rates:

Forty rooms without bath $2.00; thirty rooms with bath $2.50; sixty rooms with bath $3.00; twenty rooms with bath $3.50; (with an additional charge of $1.00 for each extra person in the room). Twenty-two rooms with twin beds and bath $6.00; 22 rooms with twin beds and bath at $7 and up per day.

=== Main Street ===
In order from north to south:

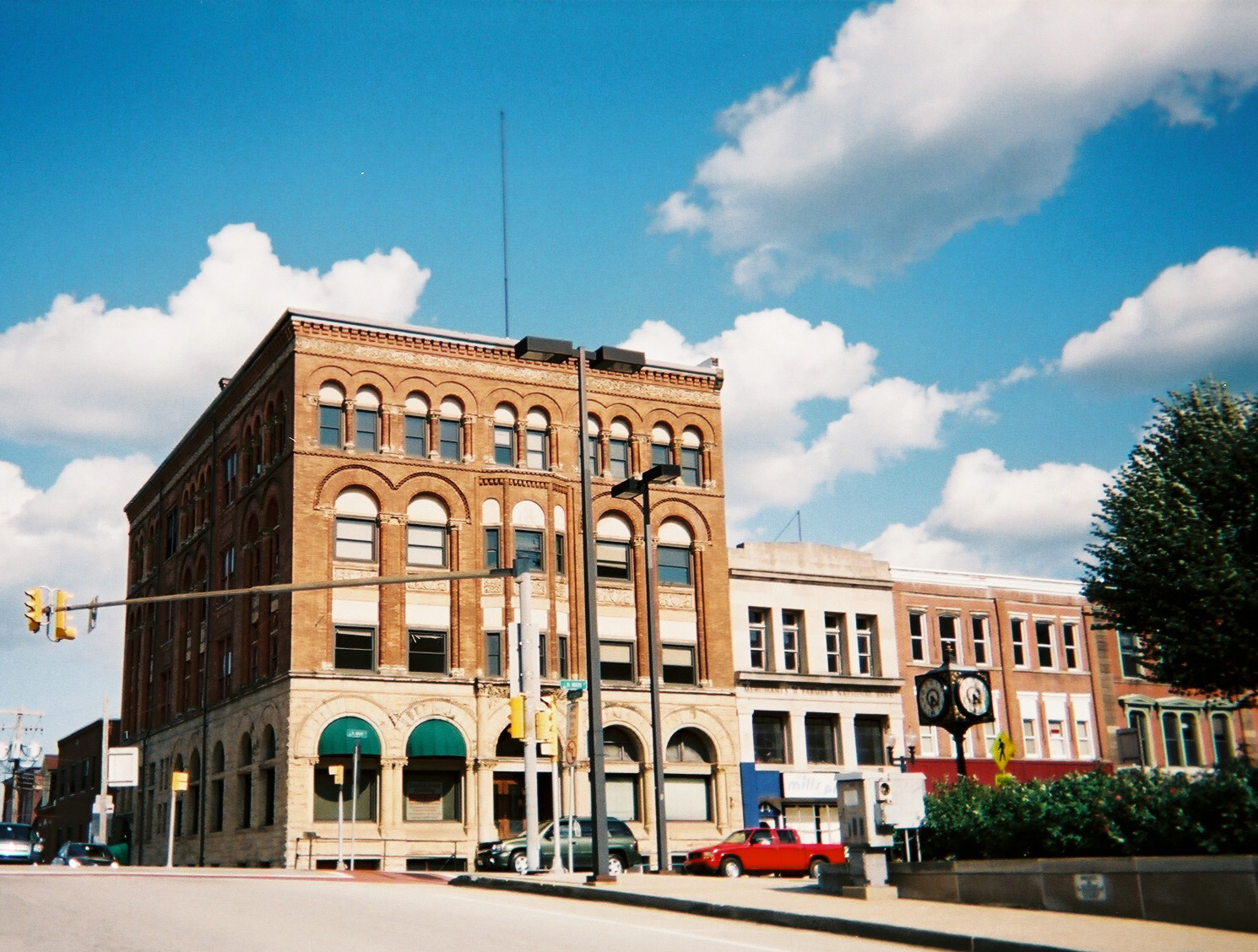
Bank and Trust Building (1896)

- Christ's Church (145 North Main Street) is a sandstone structure in a Gothic Revival style, dating from 1889.
- Union Trust Building (102 North Main Street) is a two-story red brick building with classical details built in 1921 that once served as bank and office facilities, including the Westmoreland-Fayette Coal and Coke Company headquarters. The Westmoreland Cultural Trust acquired the building in 2004. In its current state, the building has various retail and professional tenants, as well as a conference center operated by the Trust.
- Sears Department Store (101 North Main Street), now used as offices, is a two-story brick Classical Revival structure built approximately in 1930.
- Bank and Trust Building (41 North Main Street) is a four-story 1896 Romanesque Revival building.
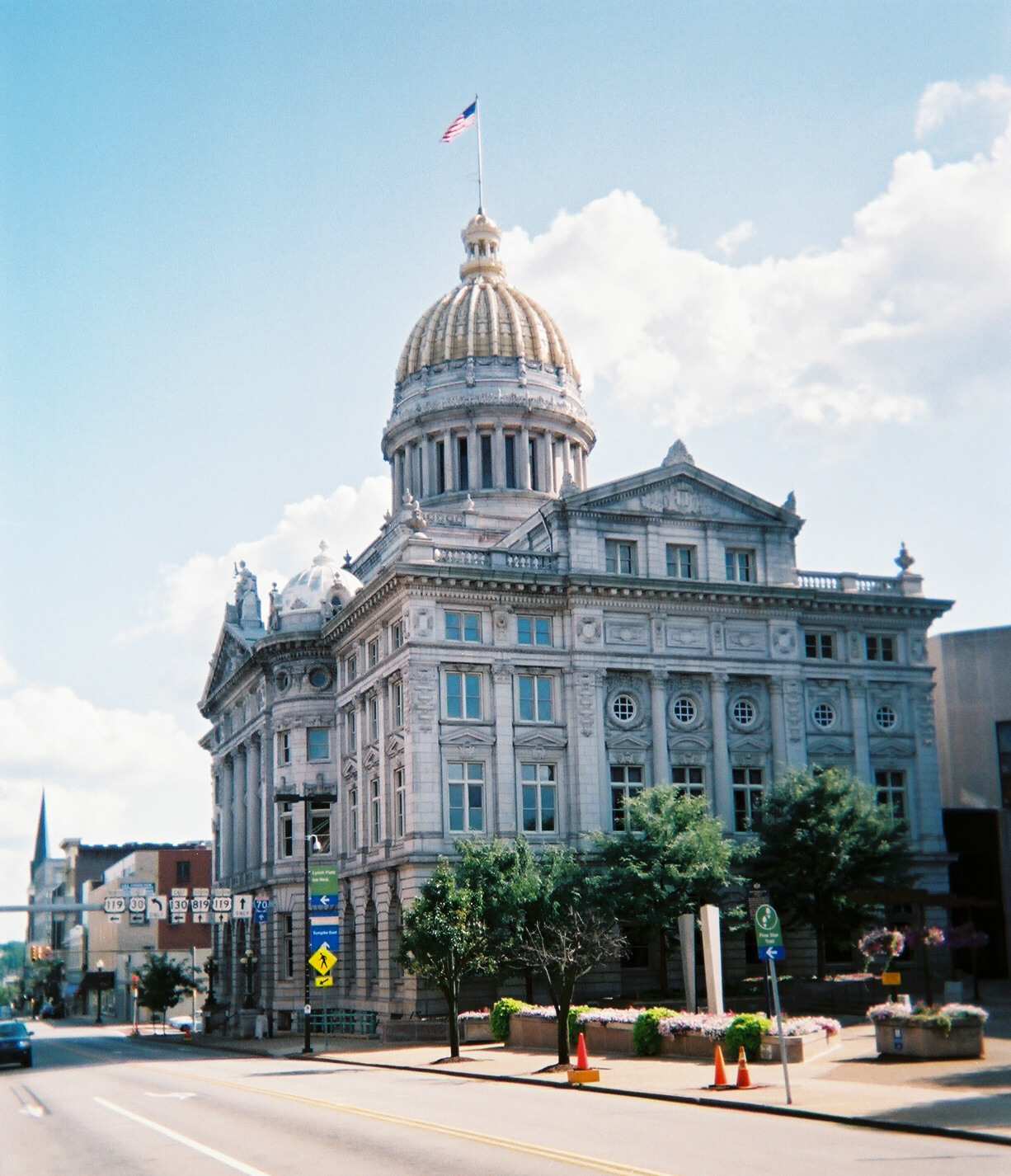
  Westmoreland County Courthouse (1908)
- Westmoreland County Courthouse (2 North Main Street) is the county's fourth courthouse, built 1906-08. It is remarkable for its dome, reminiscent of the U.S. Capitol, and interior atrium dominated by a grand staircase. Architect William Kauffman designed the building in a style that has been variously described as Beaux Arts, Italian Renaissance, and French Renaissance. The exterior has a granite facade, and the interior has 15 wall and ceiling murals by artist Maurice Ingres.
- 1 North Main Street was built in 1928 as a bank with a limestone facade in a Classical Revival style. It was initially the Barclay-Westmoreland Trust, then a Mellon Bank, and later a Citizens' Bank.
- First Commonwealth Bank (111 South Main Street), originally First National Bank, later Southwest Bank, is a seven-story red brick building in a Classical Revival style, built in 1924. Paul Bartholomew, who also designed Troutman's and the YMCA, served as architect.
- St. Vincent de Paul (126 South Main Street) was originally McCrory's, one of Greensburg's "5 and 10s" or variety stores. This 1920s building is now a thrift shop for the Society of St. Vincent de Paul. The interior and exterior have changed very little from their days as a "5 and 10", except that the basement level has been closed to the public.
- Masonic Temple Building (132 South Main Street) is a four-story building with an Italianate cast iron facade, now used as law offices. Built in 1872, it is the oldest building in the historic district.

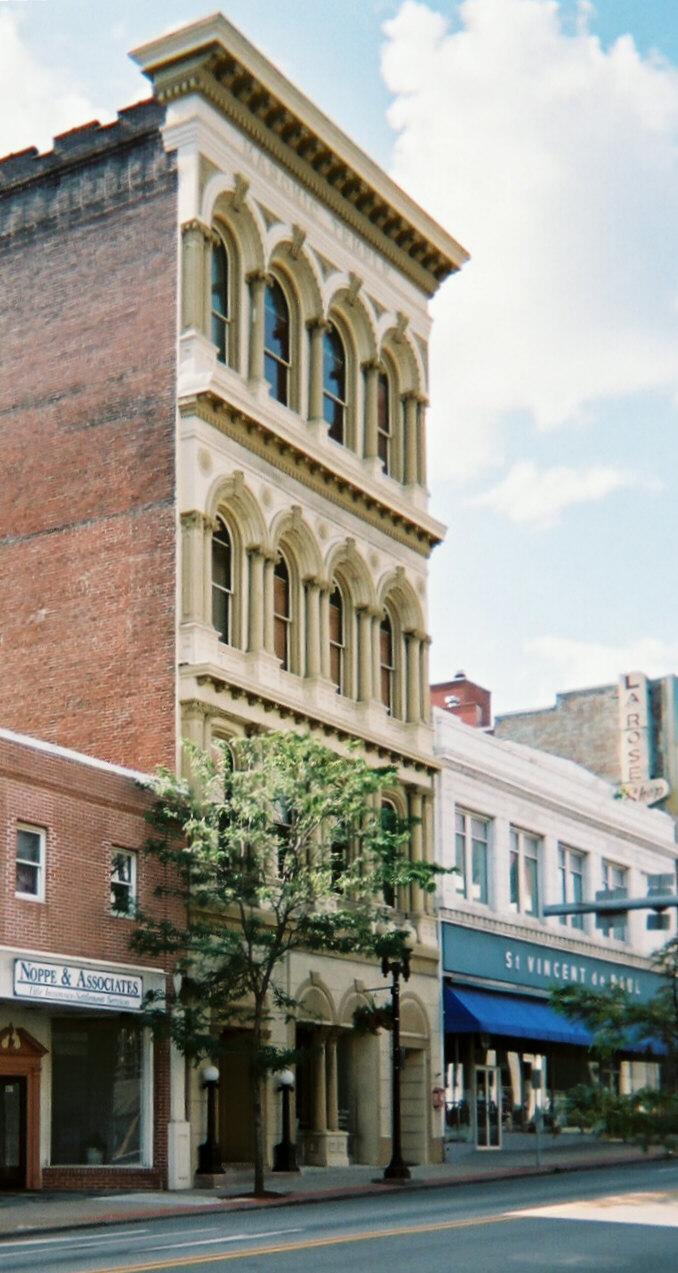
Masonic Temple (1872)

- Troutman's Department Store (202-226 South Main Street) was once the city's largest department store, now used for offices and seniors' housing. It has six stories with a limestone and terracotta facade in an Italianate style. It was designed by Paul Bartholomew and built in 1923, with a later 1960s-era addition extending through to South Pennsylvania Avenue.
- First Presbyterian Church of Greensburg (300 South Main Street) is an English Gothic style church built in 1917, designed by the Boston architect Ralph Adams Cram, who also designed the Cathedral of Saint John the Divine, New York, and many of the buildings of Princeton University.

=== Otterman Street ===
This street was named after Ludwig (or Ludwick) Otterman (originally Ottoman) (1738–1791), an early settler.

- Palace Theatre (21 West Otterman Street), formerly the Manos Theater, is a three-story red brick structure with some art deco characteristics that has been restored for use as a live entertainment venue. The original architects were Leon H. Lempert and Son of Rochester, New York, and interior murals were by Louis Grell. Initially, this 1926 building had offices on the second floor, apartments on the third floor, shops, a theater lobby on the first floor, and a combination of a billiard hall and bowling alleys in the basement. On the east side of the Palace Theatre, an adjoining theater (variously known as the Lomison Opera House, the Keaggy Theatre, and the Strand Theater) was torn down to provide space for a courtyard and auxiliary facilities for the Palace Theatre. Renovations completed in September 2004 added the Megan's Suite, an expanded two-level suite with table seating for guests to enjoy refreshments before the show or during intermission.
- Stark / James Building is a three-story brick building at the corner of West Otterman Street and Harrison Avenue. The older portion is the Stark Hotel (35, 39, and 41 West Otterman Street), built in 1889 and later known as the Merchants Hotel, and still later known as the New Merchants Hotel. The extreme eastern segment of the building was originally a house belonging to a Mrs. C. H. Stark, and it likely predates the 1889 date attributed to the Stark Hotel as a whole. This easternmost segment is believed to include elements of a 1796 structure. A carved stone segment embedded in the east wall, visible from Pennsylvania Avenue, states cryptically, "Rebuilt 1888 1796". The hotel originally appealed to traveling salespeople, and in its final years, it provided cheap accommodations for elderly tenants. The Westmoreland Cultural Trust acquired the building in 2001 and tastefully renovated it for retail and office use. An adjacent building, the James Building (33 West Otterman Street), was acquired by the Westmoreland Cultural Trust in 1996, and the two structures are managed as a single building.
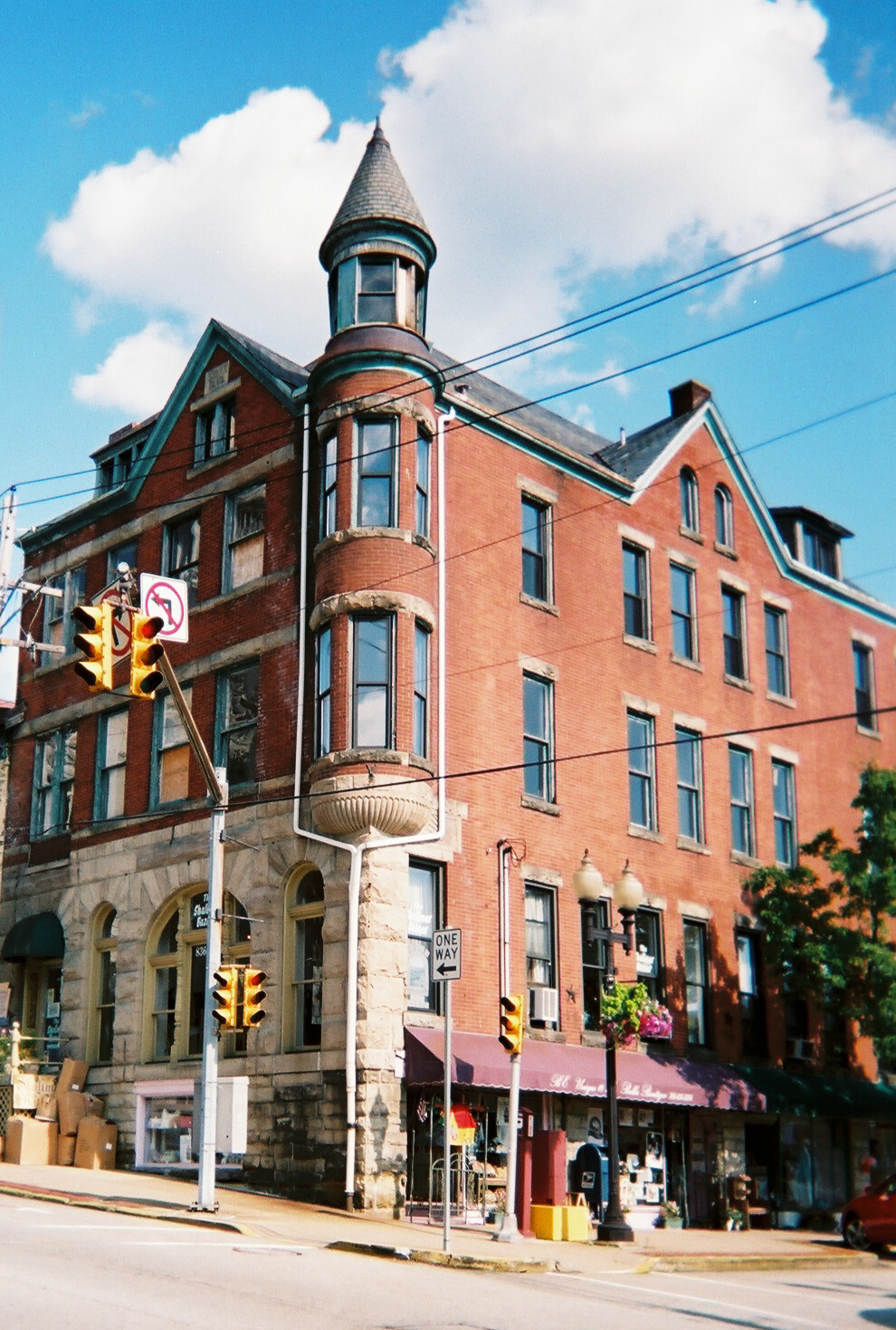
  Cope Hotel (1893)

=== Pittsburgh Street ===
Pittsburgh Street would have been "First Street" if the streets had been named logically. There is no "First Street" in Greensburg.

- Cope Hotel (22 West Pittsburgh Street) was one of Greensburg's oldest hotels, built in 1893, a Romanesque Revival red brick building with three stories, plus an attic level and a basement level with retail outlets fronting on South Pennsylvania Avenue. It bears the name of Cyrus P. Cope, who operated a tavern on this site and was the hotel's owner when it was built. In 2009-2010, its upper floors were renovated for use as student apartments, known as the Felice Building Apartments.

== See also ==
- Academy Hill Historic District
- Greensburg, Pennsylvania
- Paul Bartholomew
- National Register of Historic Places listings in Westmoreland County, Pennsylvania
- West Penn Railways
- Westmoreland County, Pennsylvania

== Gallery ==
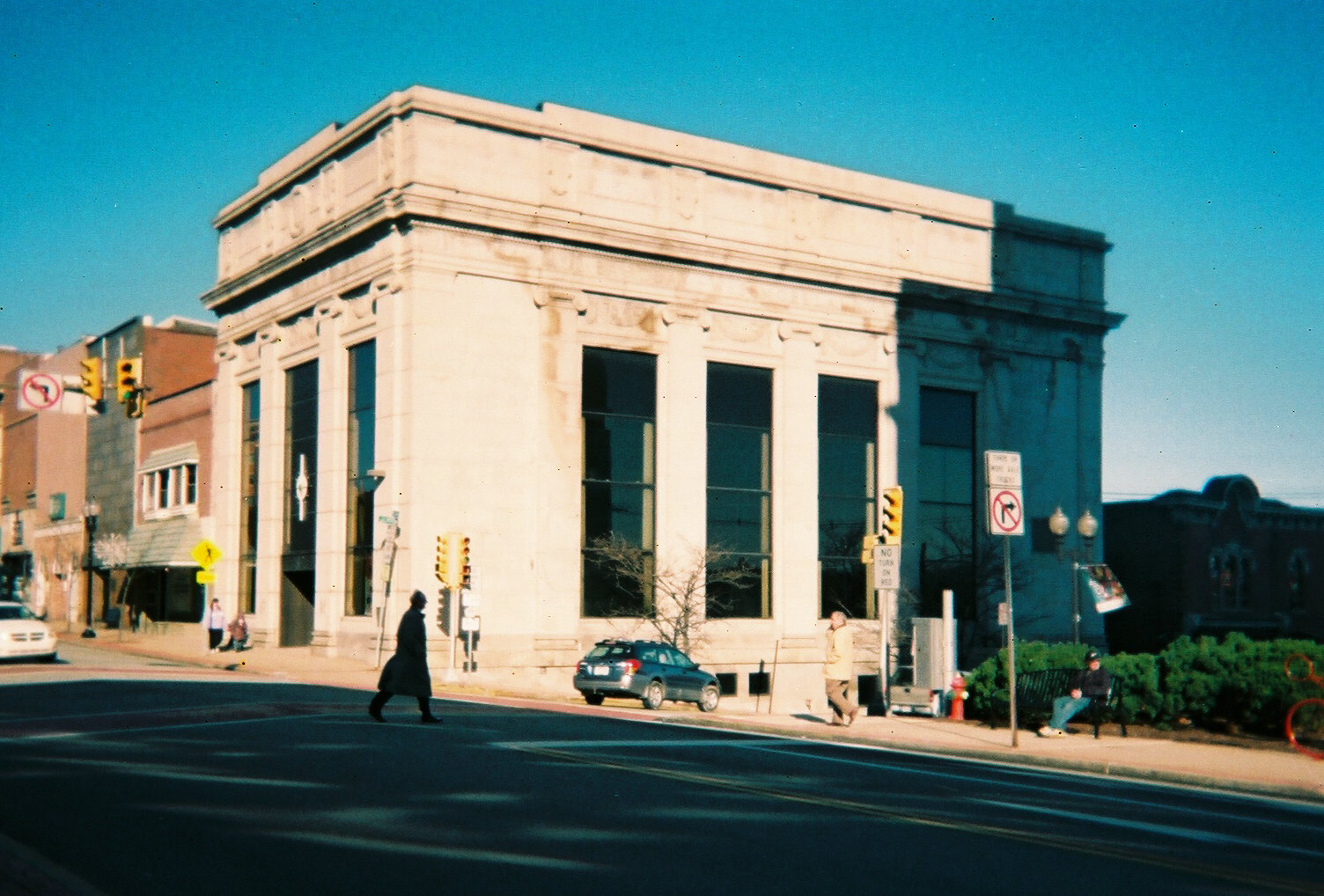
1 North Main Street (1928)

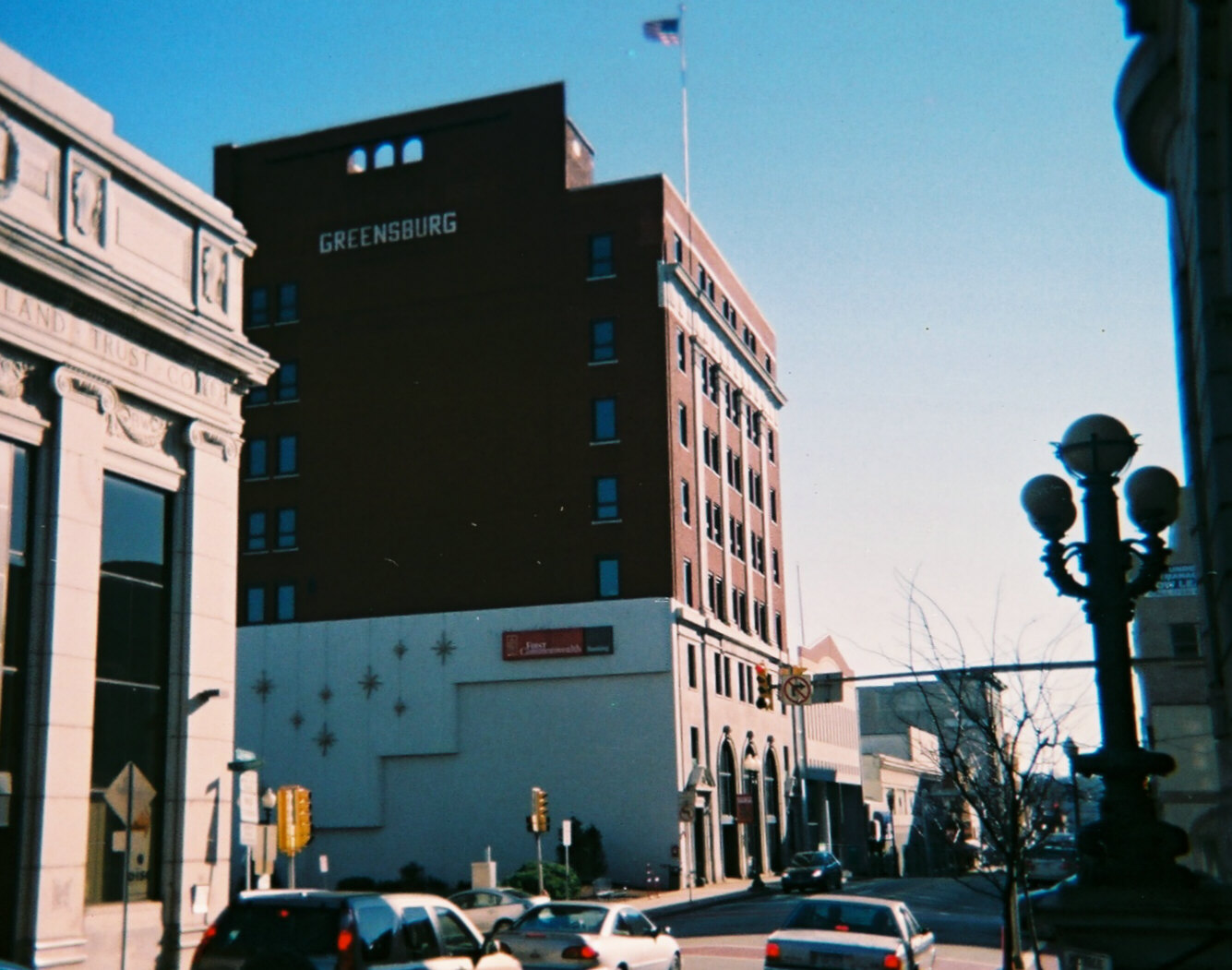
First Commonwealth Bank (1924)

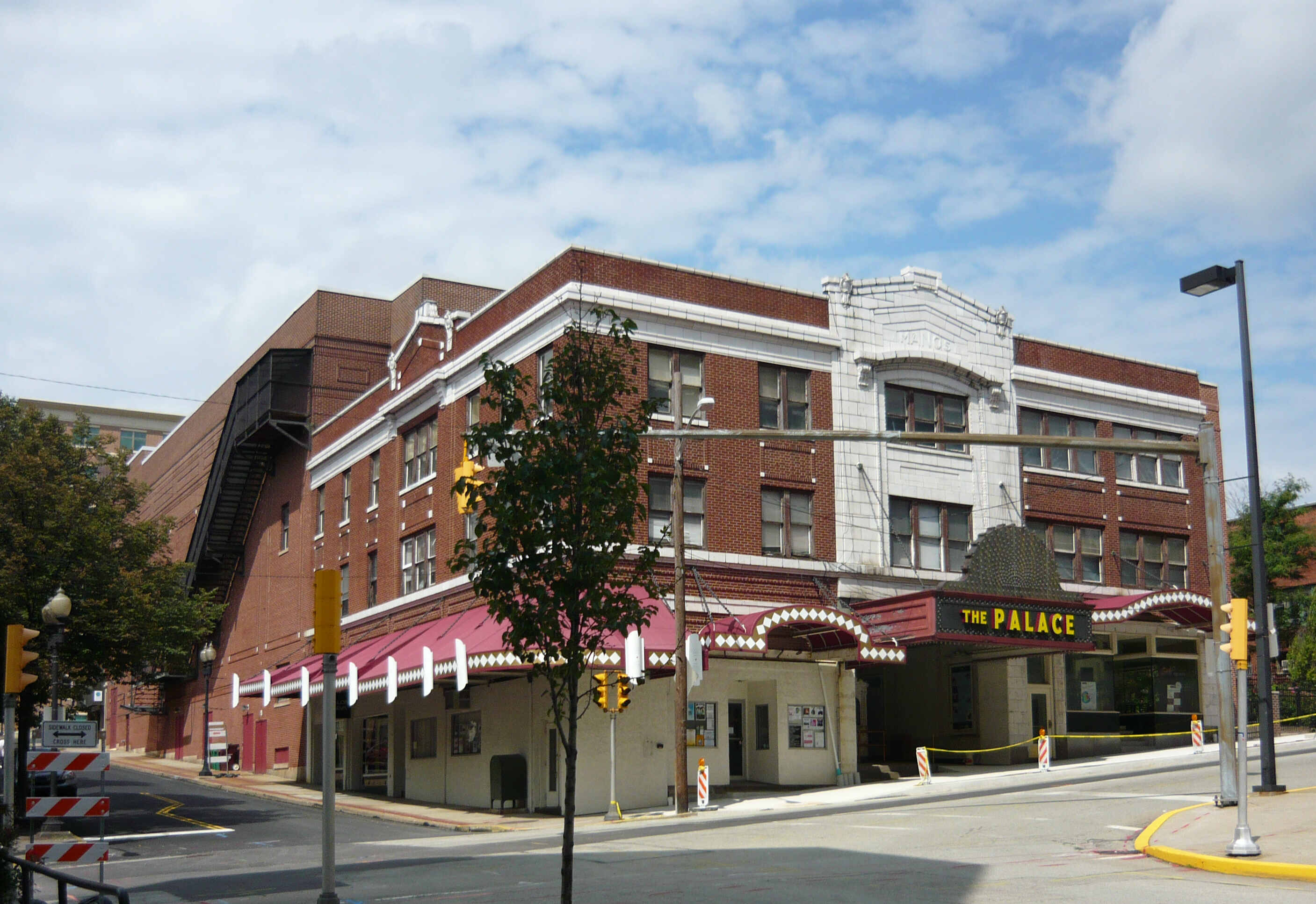
Palace Theater (1926)

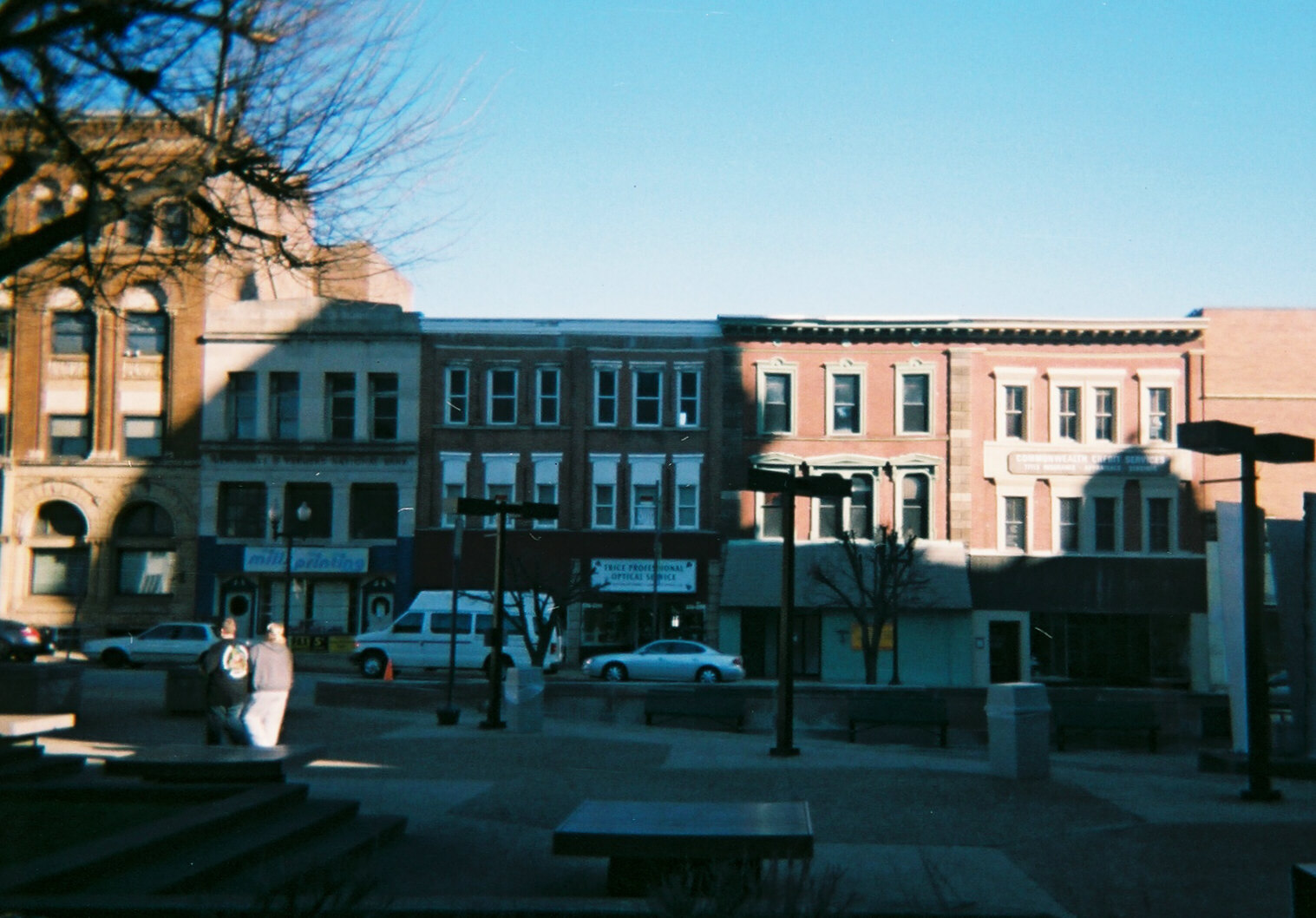
Buildings on North Main

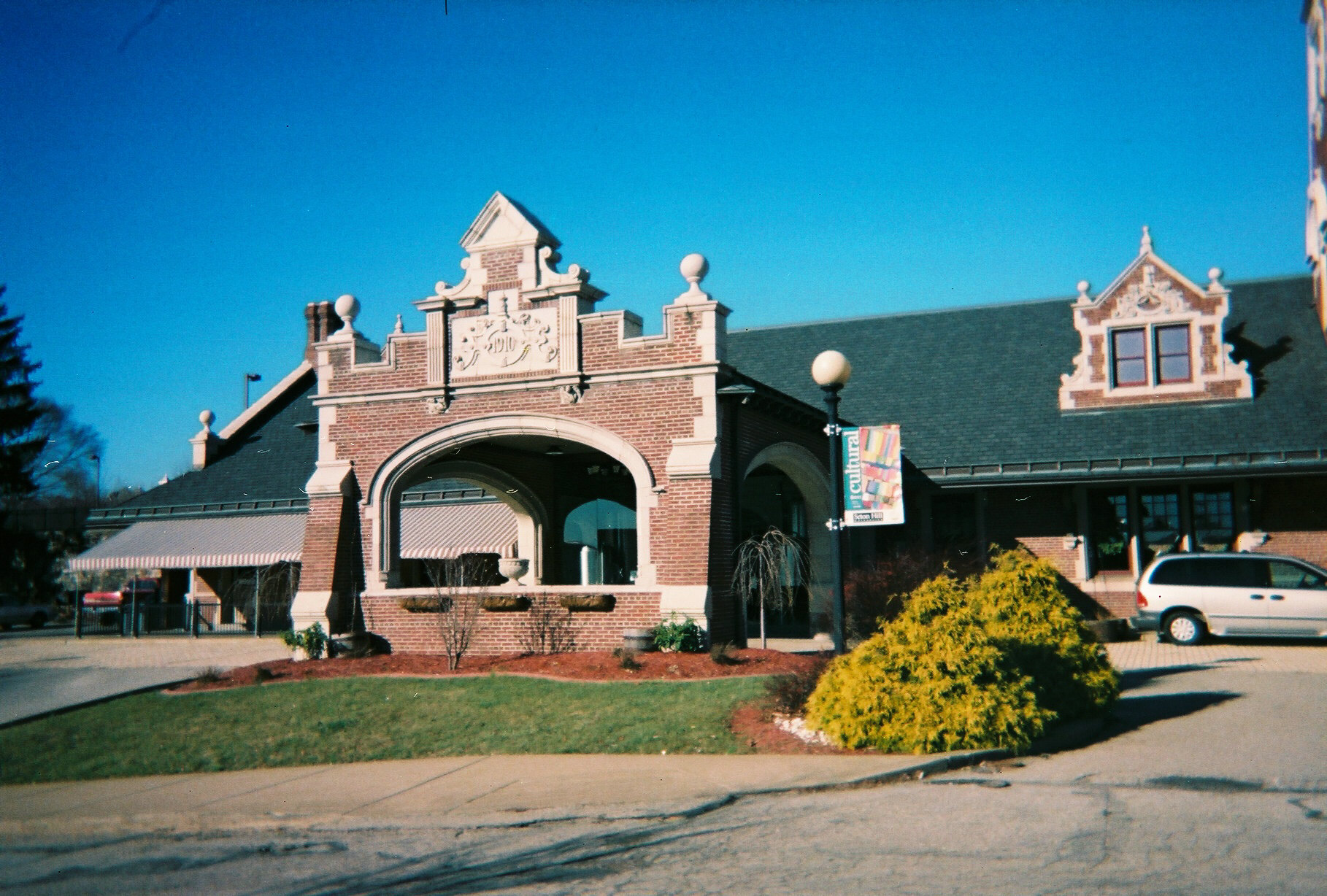
Train Station Portico (1911)

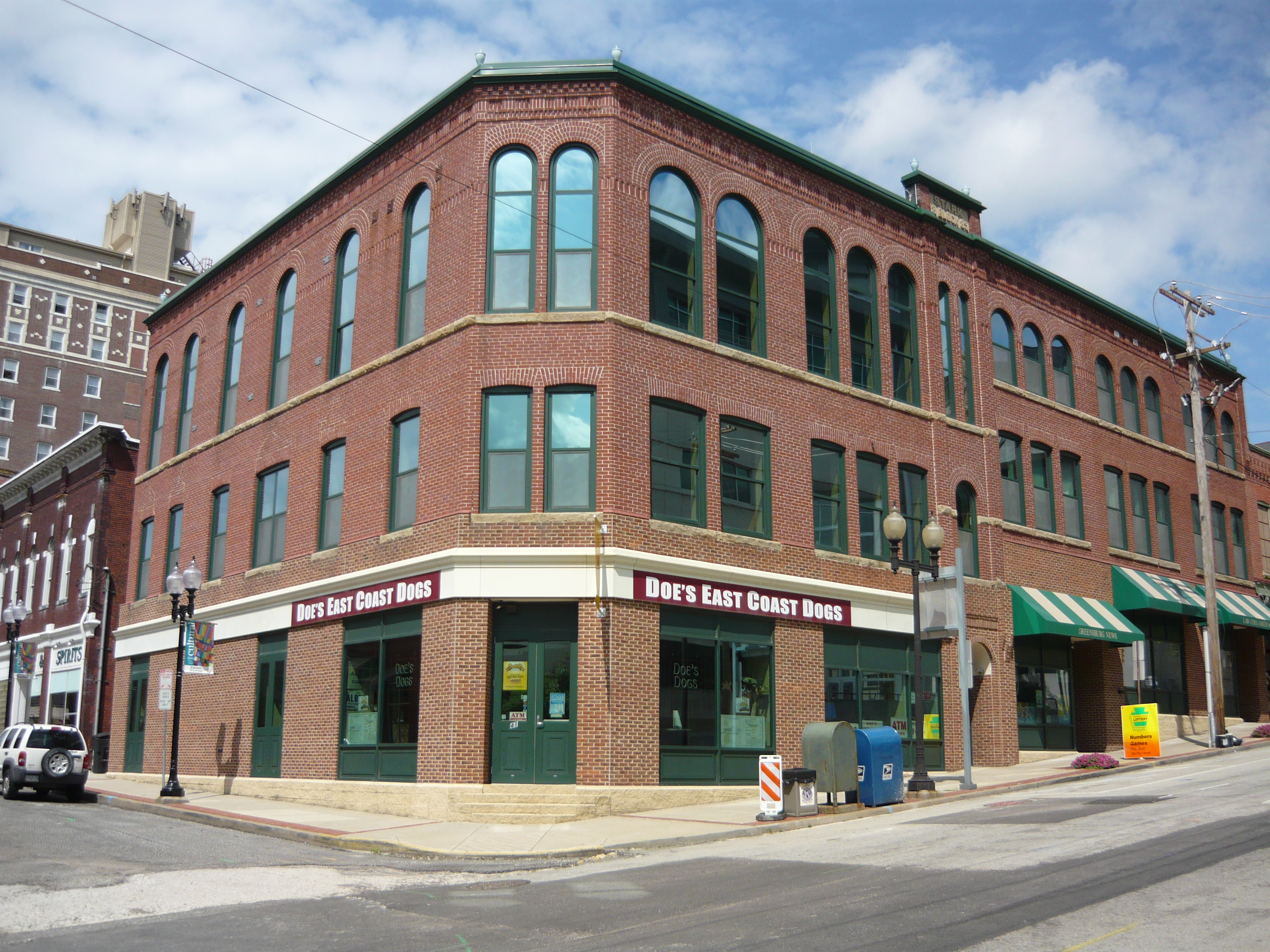
Stark/James Building (1889/1796)

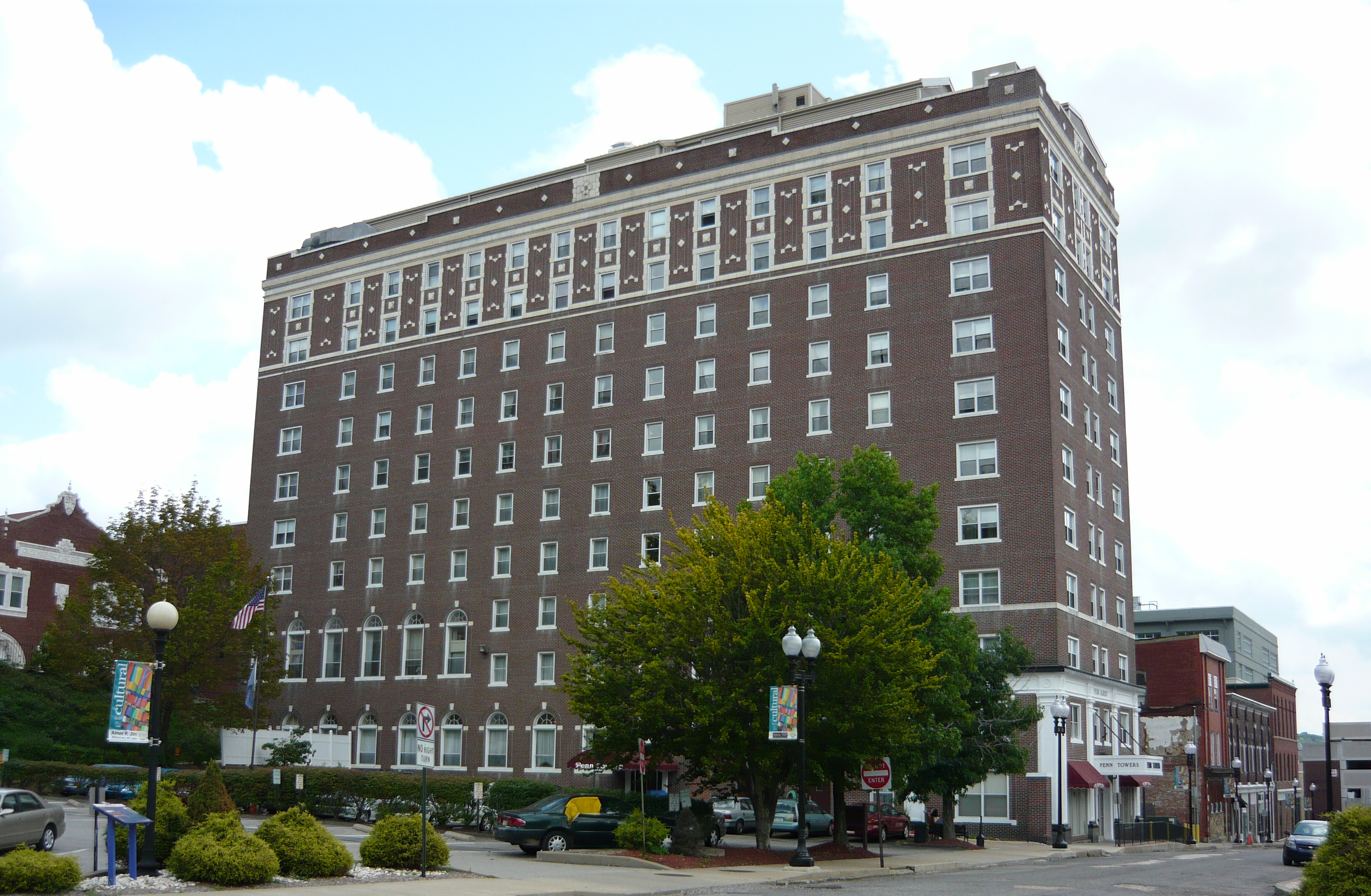
Penn Towers (1923)
Former Penn-Albert Hotel

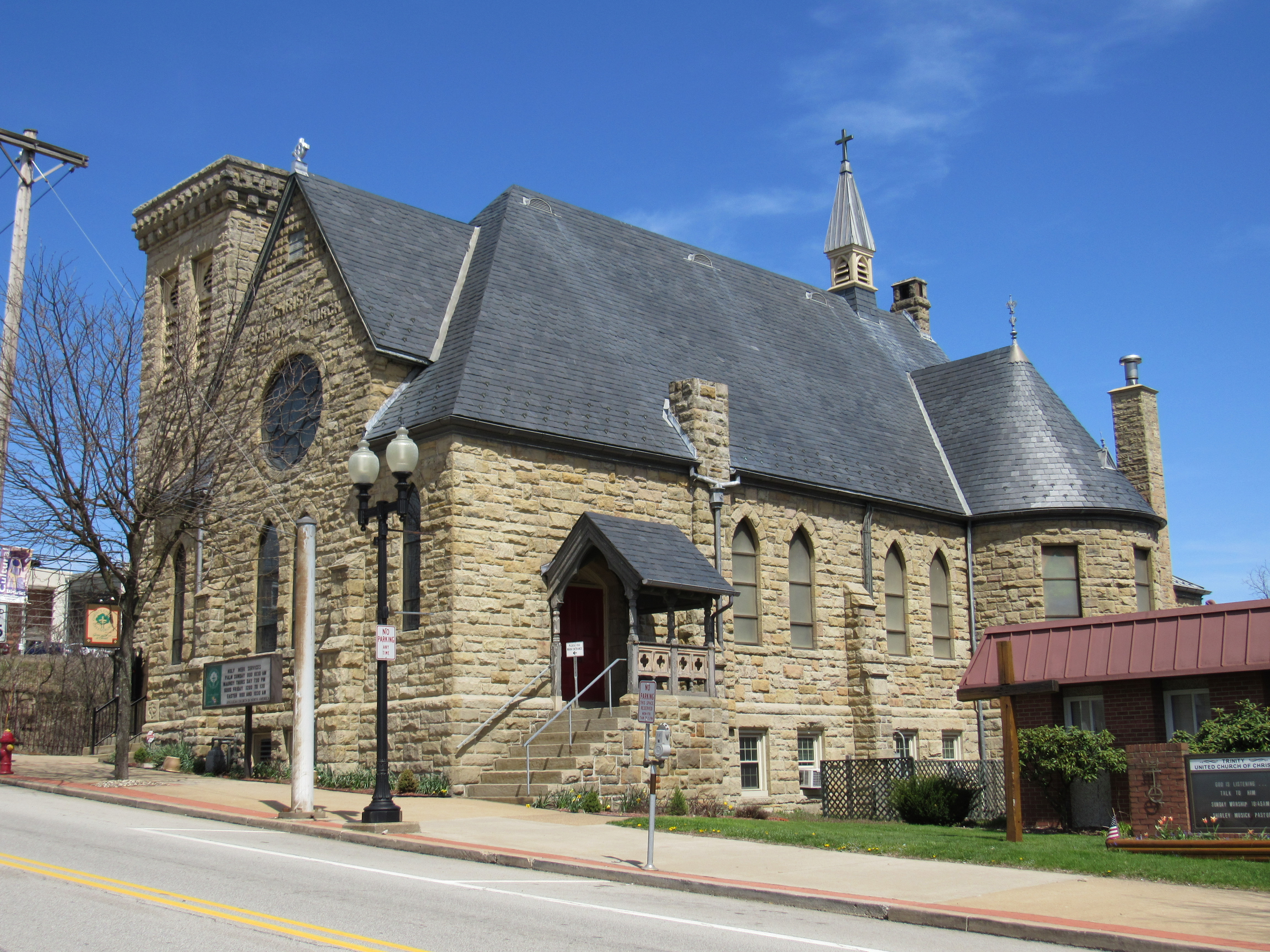
Christ's Church (1889-1891)
