= Good Shepherd =

Epithet of Jesus

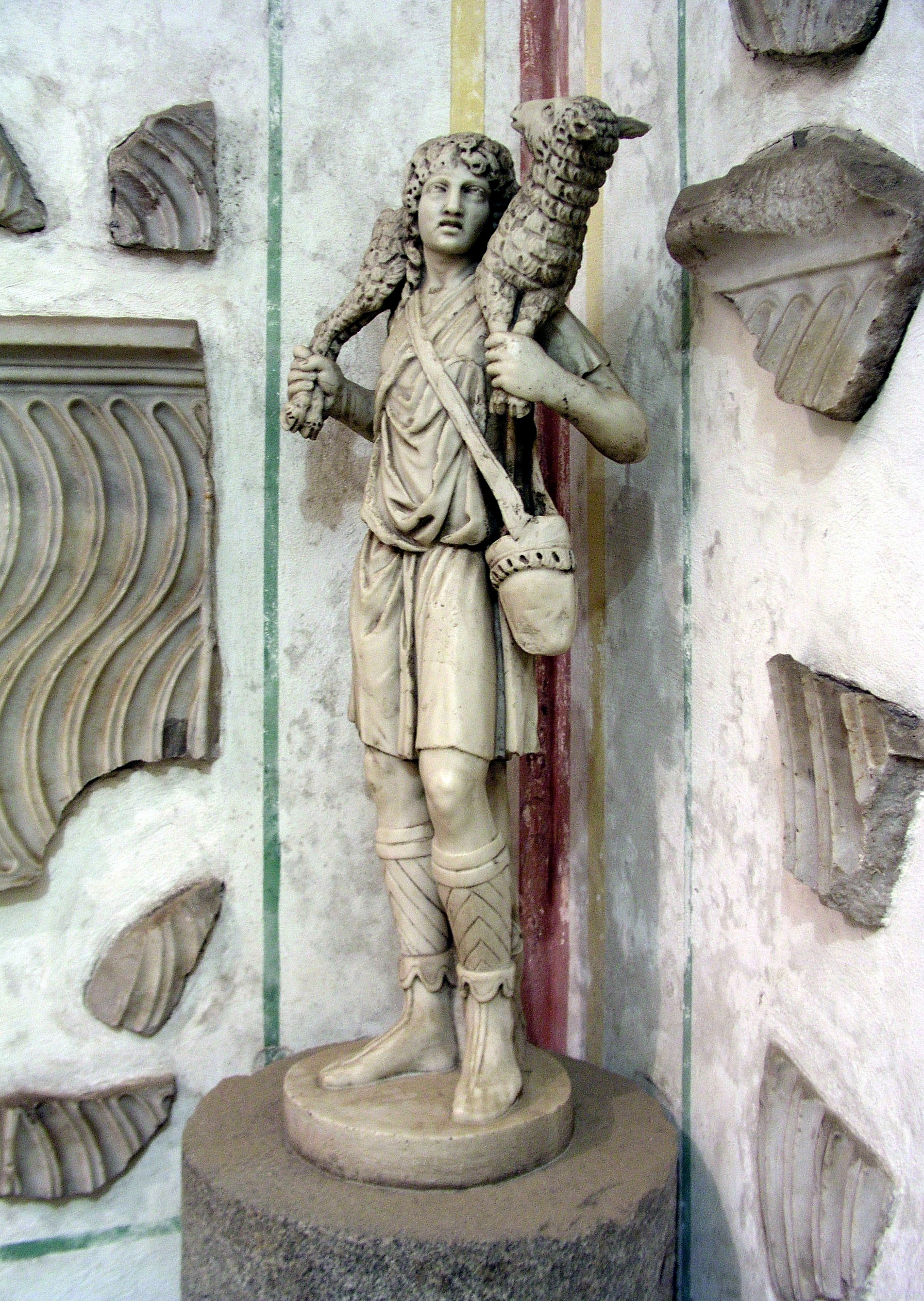
The Good Shepherd, made c. 300–350 and discovered in the 18th century at the Catacomb of Callixtus, Rome.

The Good Shepherd (Greek: ποιμὴν ὁ καλός, poimḗn ho kalós) is an image used in the pericope of John 10:1–21, in which Jesus Christ is depicted as the Good Shepherd who lays down his life for his sheep. Similar imagery is used in Psalm 23 and Ezekiel 34:11–16. The Good Shepherd is also discussed in the other gospels, the Epistle to the Hebrews, the First Epistle of Peter and the Book of Revelation.

== Biblical references ==
In the Gospel of John, Jesus states "I am the good shepherd" in two verses, John 10:11 and 10:14.

I am the good shepherd. The good shepherd lays down his life for the sheep. He who is a hired hand, and not a shepherd, who doesn't own the sheep, sees the wolf coming, leaves the sheep, and flees. The wolf snatches the sheep, and scatters them. The hired hand flees because he is a hired hand, and doesn't care for the sheep. I am the good shepherd. I know my own, and I'm known by my own; even as the Father knows me, and I know the Father. I lay down my life for the sheep. I have other sheep, which are not of this fold. I must bring them also, and they will hear my voice. They will become one flock with one shepherd. Therefore the Father loves me, because I lay down my life, that I may take it again. No one takes it away from me, but I lay it down by myself. I have power to lay it down, and I have power to take it again. I received this commandment from my Father

— John 10:11–18

This passage is one of several sections of John's Gospel which generate division among Jews.

Jesus Christ is also compared to a shepherd in Matthew 2:6, Matthew 9:36, Matthew 25:32, Matthew 26:31, Mark 6:34, Mark 14:27, John 10:2, Hebrews 13:20, 1 Peter 2:25, 1 Peter 5:4, and Revelation 7:17.

== Parable/metaphor dispute ==
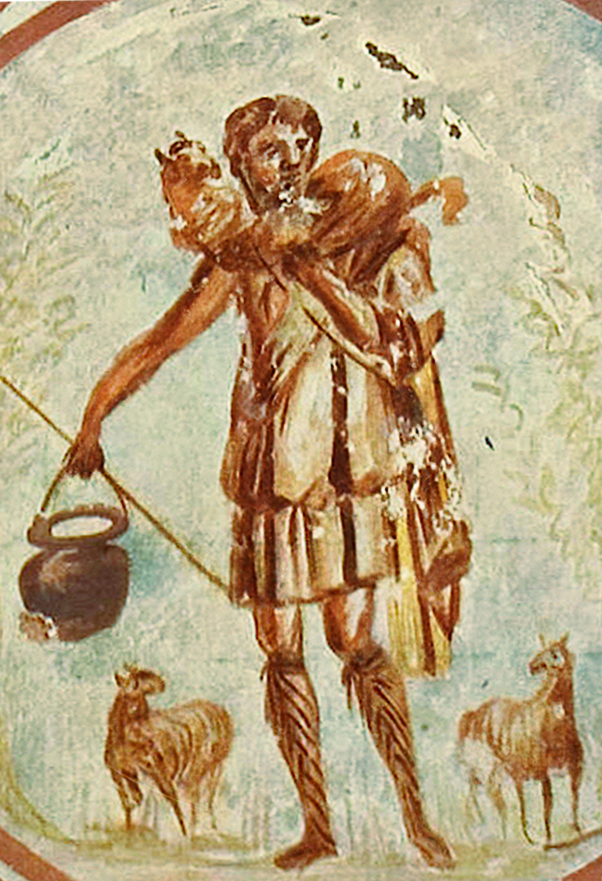
Allegory of Christ as the Good Shepherd, 3rd century. The pail (of milk?) carried by the Shepherd has been seen as symbolizing the Eucharist by some.

Several authors such as Barbara Reid, Arland Hultgren or Donald Griggs comment that "parables are noticeably absent from the Gospel of John". According to the Catholic Encyclopedia article on Parables: "There are no parables in St. John's Gospel" and according to the Encyclopædia Britannica article on Gospel of St. John: "Here Jesus' teaching contains no parables and but three allegories, the Synoptists present it as parabolic through and through."

== Early Christian art ==
The image of the Good Shepherd is the most common of the symbolic representations of Christ found in early Christian art in the Catacombs of Rome, before Christian imagery could be made explicit. The form of the image showing a young man carrying a lamb around his neck was directly borrowed from the much older pagan kriophoros (see below) and in the case of portable statuettes like the most famous one now in the Pio Cristiano Museum, Vatican City (right), it is impossible to say whether the image was originally created with the intention of having a Christian significance. The image continued to be used in the centuries after Christianity was legalized in 313. Initially, it was probably not understood as a portrait of Jesus, but a symbol like others used in Early Christian art, and in some cases may also have represented the Shepherd of Hermas, a popular Christian literary work of the 2nd century. However, by about the 5th century, the figure more often took on the appearance of the conventional depiction of Christ, as it had developed by this time, and was given a halo and rich robes, as on the apse mosaic in the church of Santi Cosma e Damiano in Rome, or at Ravenna (right). Images of the Good Shepherd often include a sheep on his shoulders, as in the Lukan version of the Parable of the Lost Sheep.

== Interpretation ==
According to German theologian Friedrich Justus Knecht a number of doctrines are put forward in this parable. 1) The Sacrifice and Death of our Lord Jesus Christ. As Jesus "distinctly foretells His Sacrifice and Death in the words: 'I lay down My life for My sheep.'" 2) The one, united, catholic Church. As Jesus "foretold that the Gentiles also would believe in Him, and that all the faithful, both Jews and Gentiles, would be united in one fold, under one Shepherd." 3) The Love of Jesus for sinners. "The touching parable of the lost sheep shows our Lord’s compassionate love for individual sinners. The lost sheep signifies a sinner who, obeying his own evil inclinations and the allurements of sin, has separated himself from Jesus, and is shut out from the number of the faithful. But the Saviour does not withdraw His love from this wanderer. Even as, during His sojourn on earth, He laboured for the conversion of sinners, so does He now go after the sinner. He calls him by His grace, by His priests, and invites him to return once more to the fold, by means of the Sacrament of Penance."

Roger Baxter in his Meditations sees Jesus, the good shepherd, as a fulfillment of a number of Old Testament passages, writing: "This divine shepherd will visit you to-day, to feed you, and to defend you from the wolves of hell. There is no part of a shepherd's duty which He does not perform most willingly. Hence He says by His prophet, 'Behold, I Myself will seek My sheep: and will visit them as the shepherd visits his flock: I will feed them in the most fruitful pastures; I will seek that which was lost, and that which was driven away I will bring again: and I will bind up that which was broken; and I will strengthen that which is weak, and that which is fat and strong I will preserve, and I will feed them in judgment.' (Ezech. 34:11)" He also connects Jesus with Psalm 23:1, "The Lord rules me, and I shall want nothing; He has set me in a place of pasture." and Isaiah 53:7 "He shall be led as a sheep to the slaughter."

== In Mandaeism ==
The image of the Good Shepherd is also used in the Mandaean Book of John. Chapters 11–12 of the Mandaean Book of John are about "a shepherd who loves his sheep" who leads them on to the World of Light.

== Pagan symbolism ==
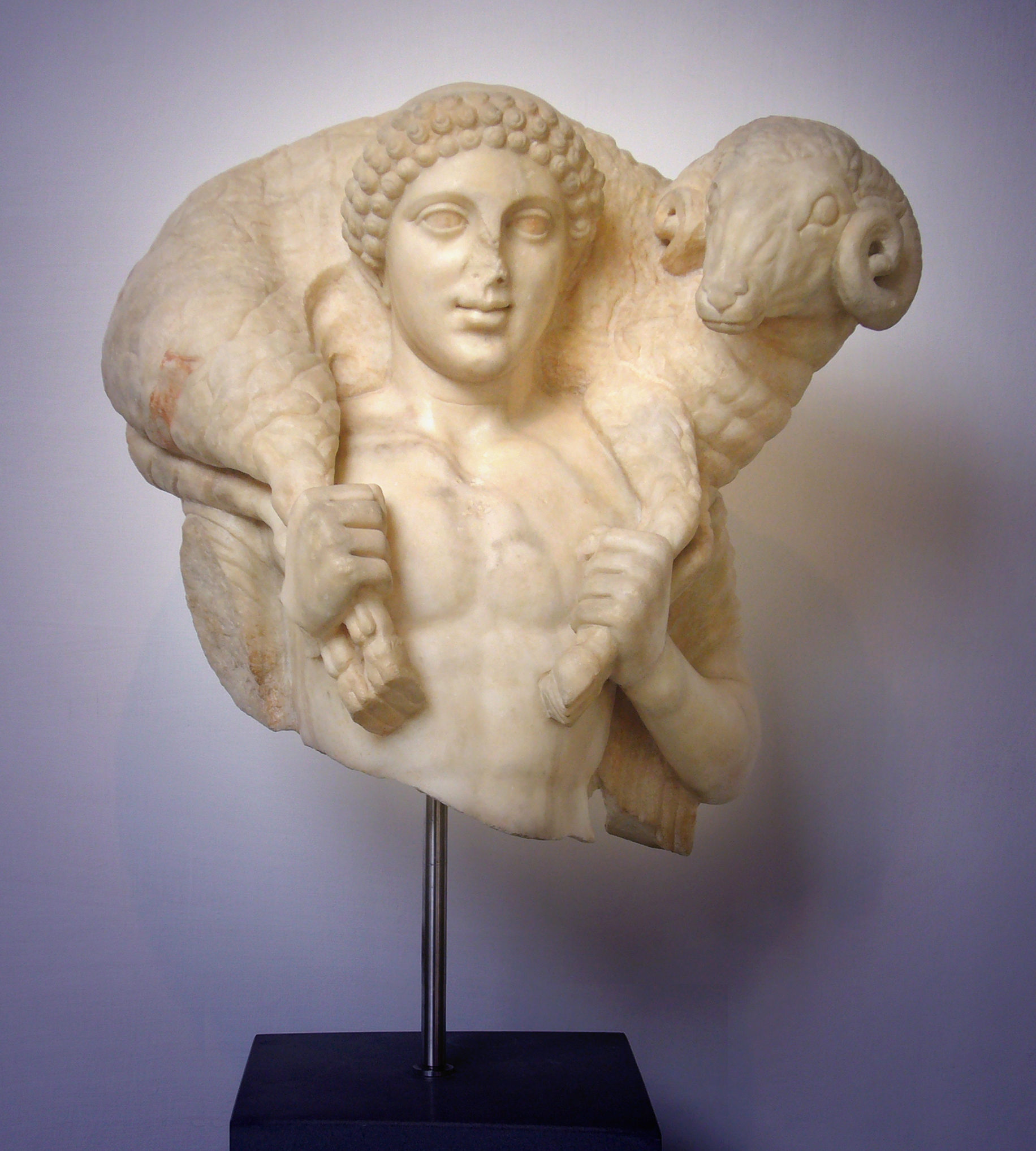
Late Roman marble copy of the Kriophoros of Calamis (Museo Barracco, Rome)

In ancient Greek cult, kriophoros or criophorus (Κριοφόρος), the "ram-bearer" is a figure that commemorates the solemn sacrifice of a ram. It becomes an epithet of Hermes: Hermes Kriophoros.

In two-dimensional art, Hermes Kriophoros transformed into the Christ carrying a lamb and walking among his sheep: "Thus we find philosophers holding scrolls or a Hermes Kriophoros which can be turned into Christ giving the Law (Traditio Legis) and the Good Shepherd respectively". The Good Shepherd is a common motif from the Catacombs of Rome (Gardner, 10, fig 54) and in sarcophagus reliefs, where Christian and pagan symbolism are often combined, making secure identifications difficult.

== Gallery ==
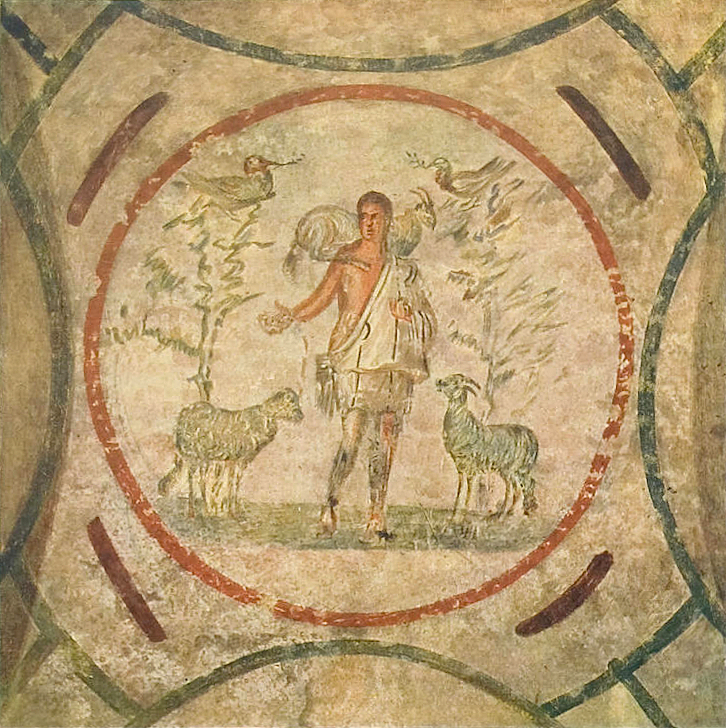
At the Catacomb of Priscilla, 3rd century A.D., Rome

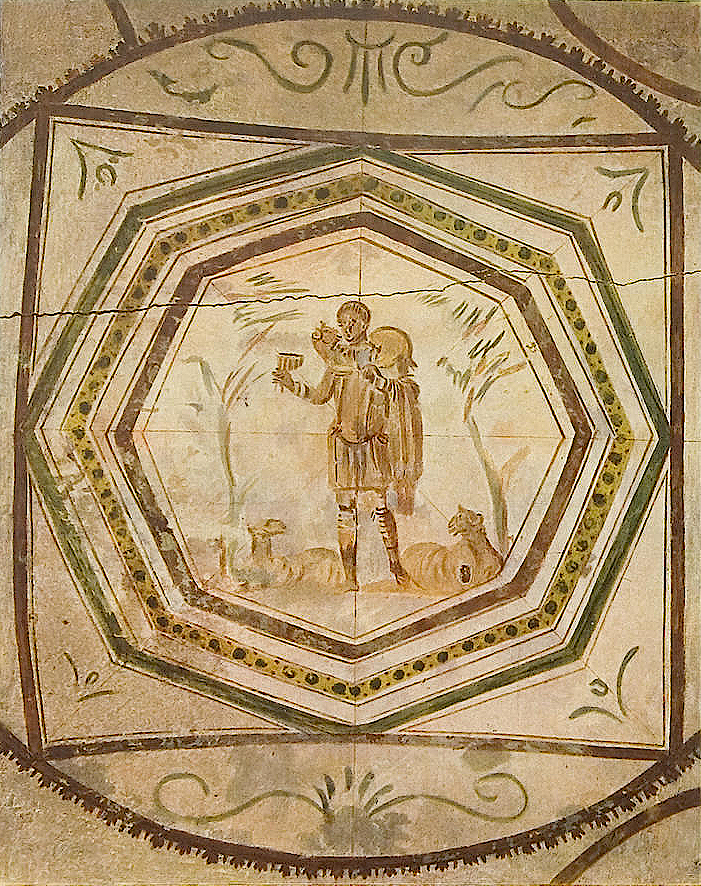
Christ as the Good Shepherd, Catacomb of Petrus and Marcellinus, 3rd century A.D.

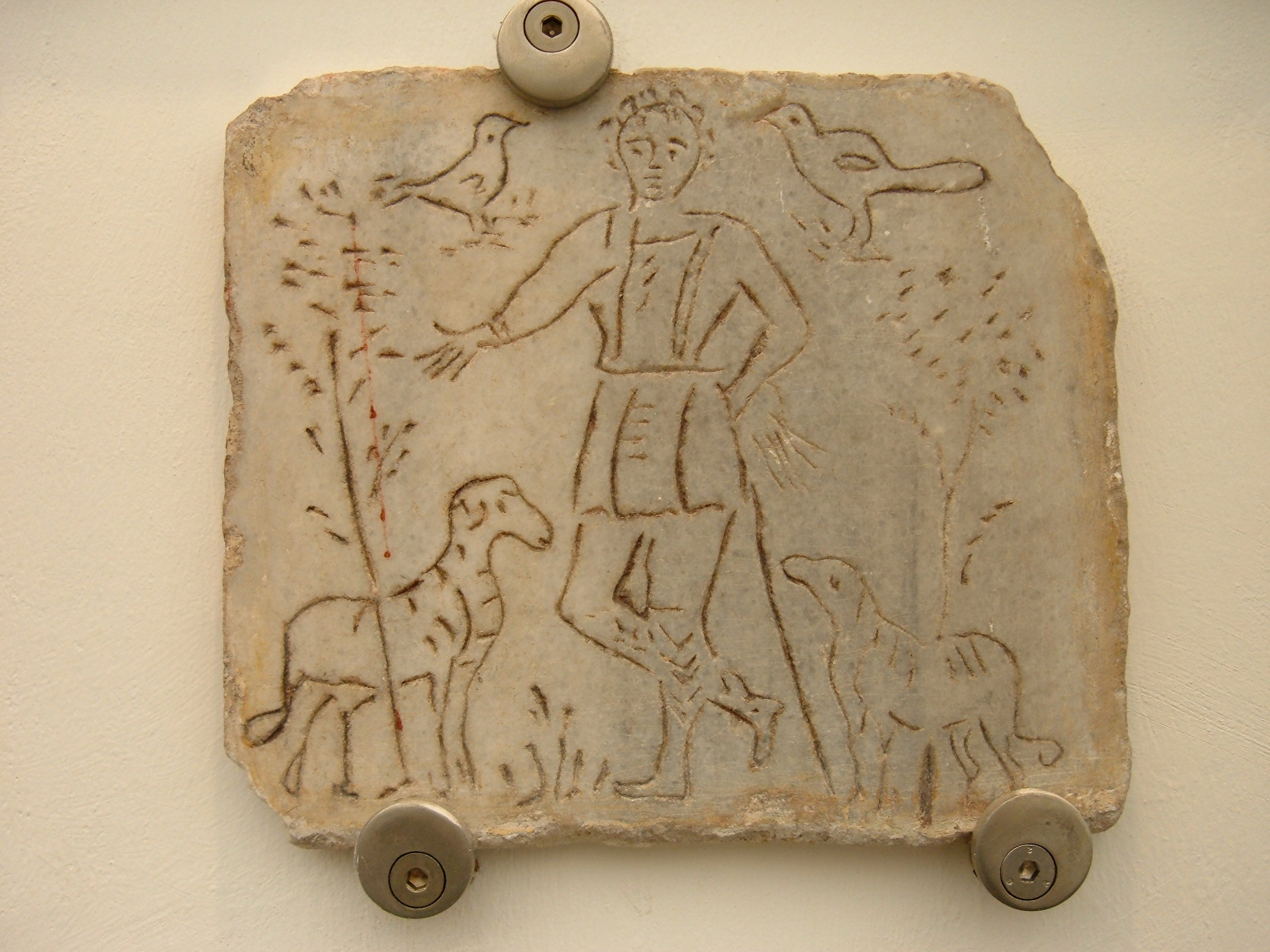
4th-century depiction at the Museum of the Baths of Diocletian, Rome

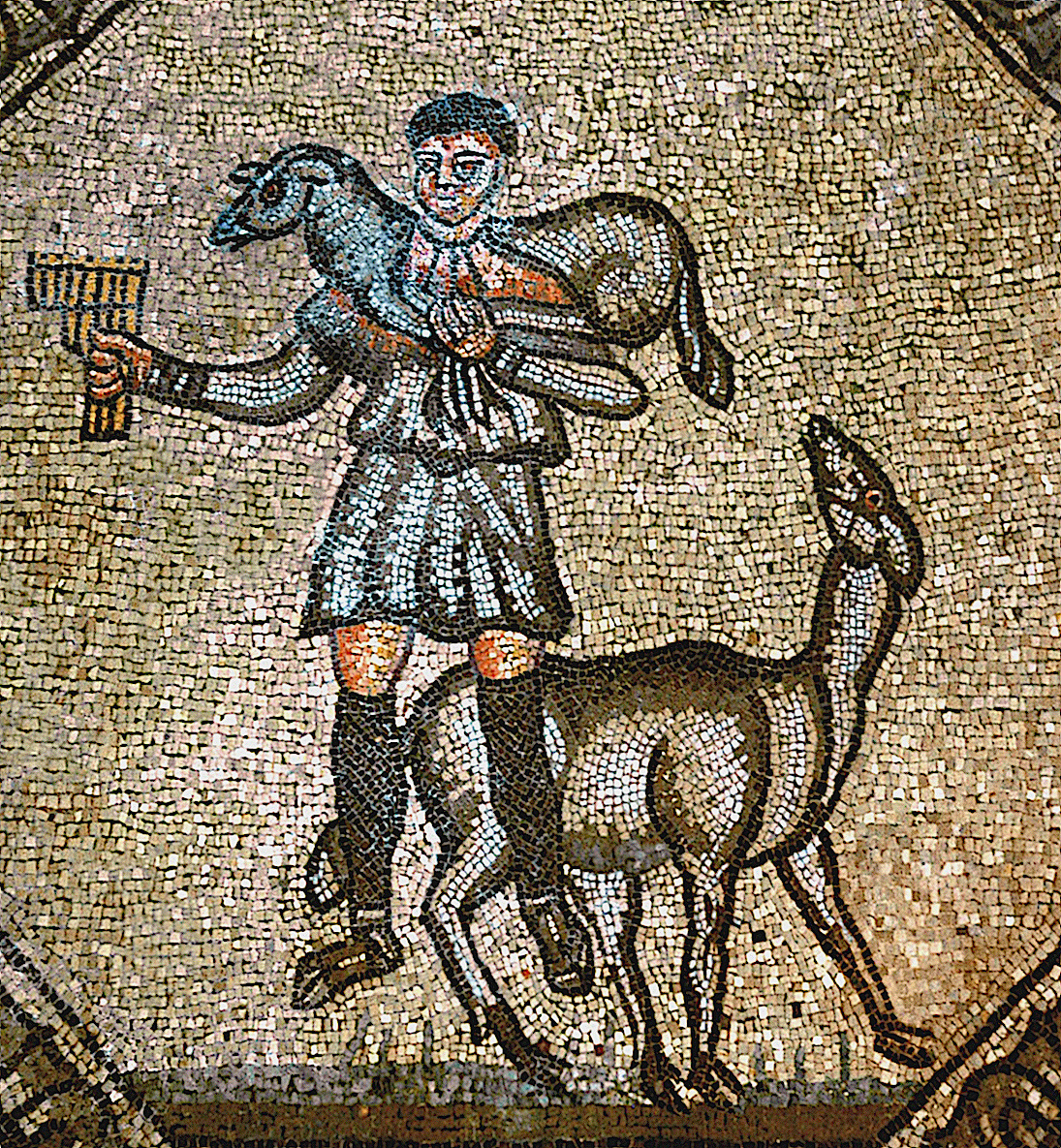
First half of 4th century A.D., Basilica di Santa Maria Assunta, Aquileia

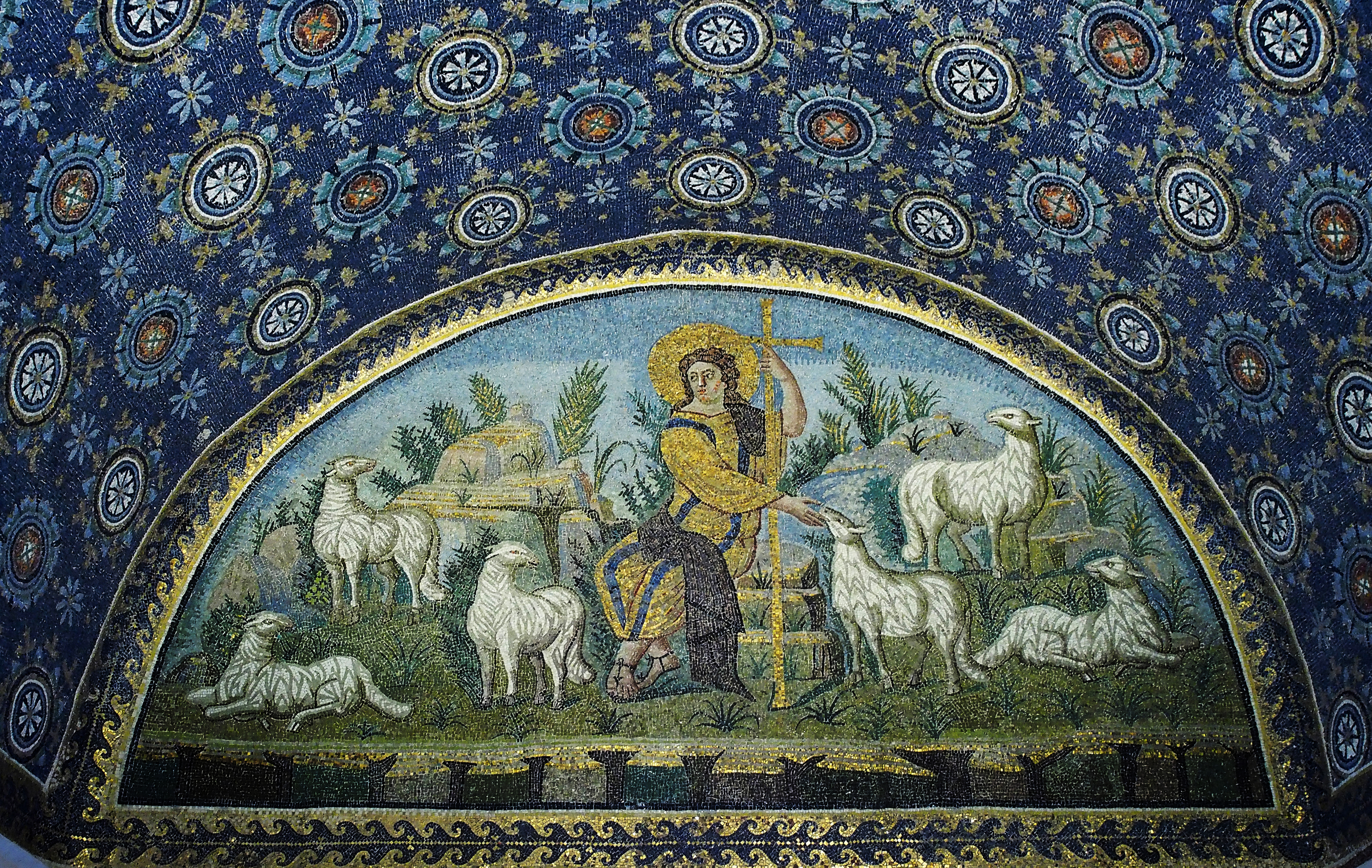
Mosaic in the Mausoleum of Galla Placidia, Ravenna, Italy, c. 425

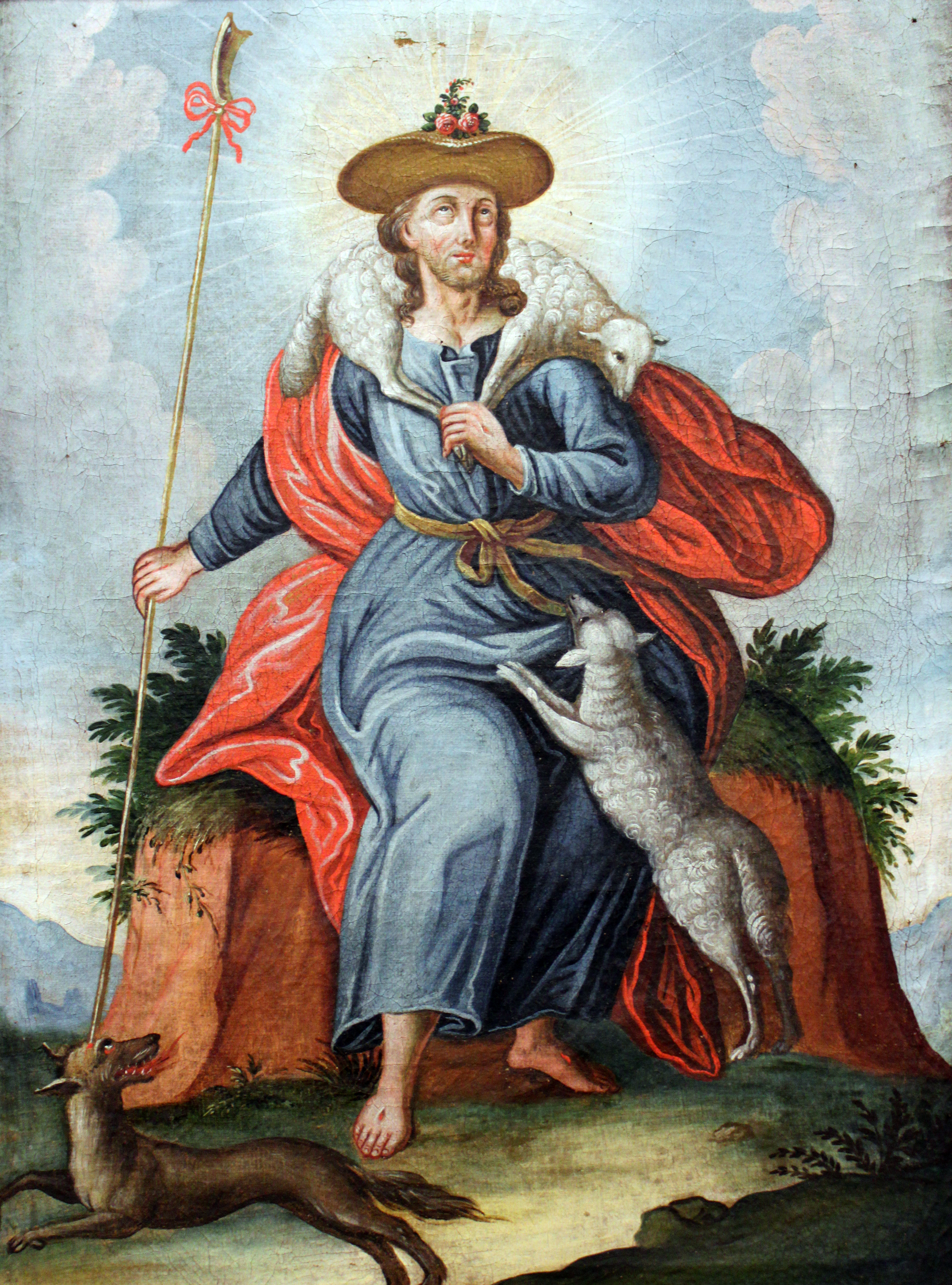
Christ as the Good Shepherd, unknown artist from Lower Bavaria, 1750

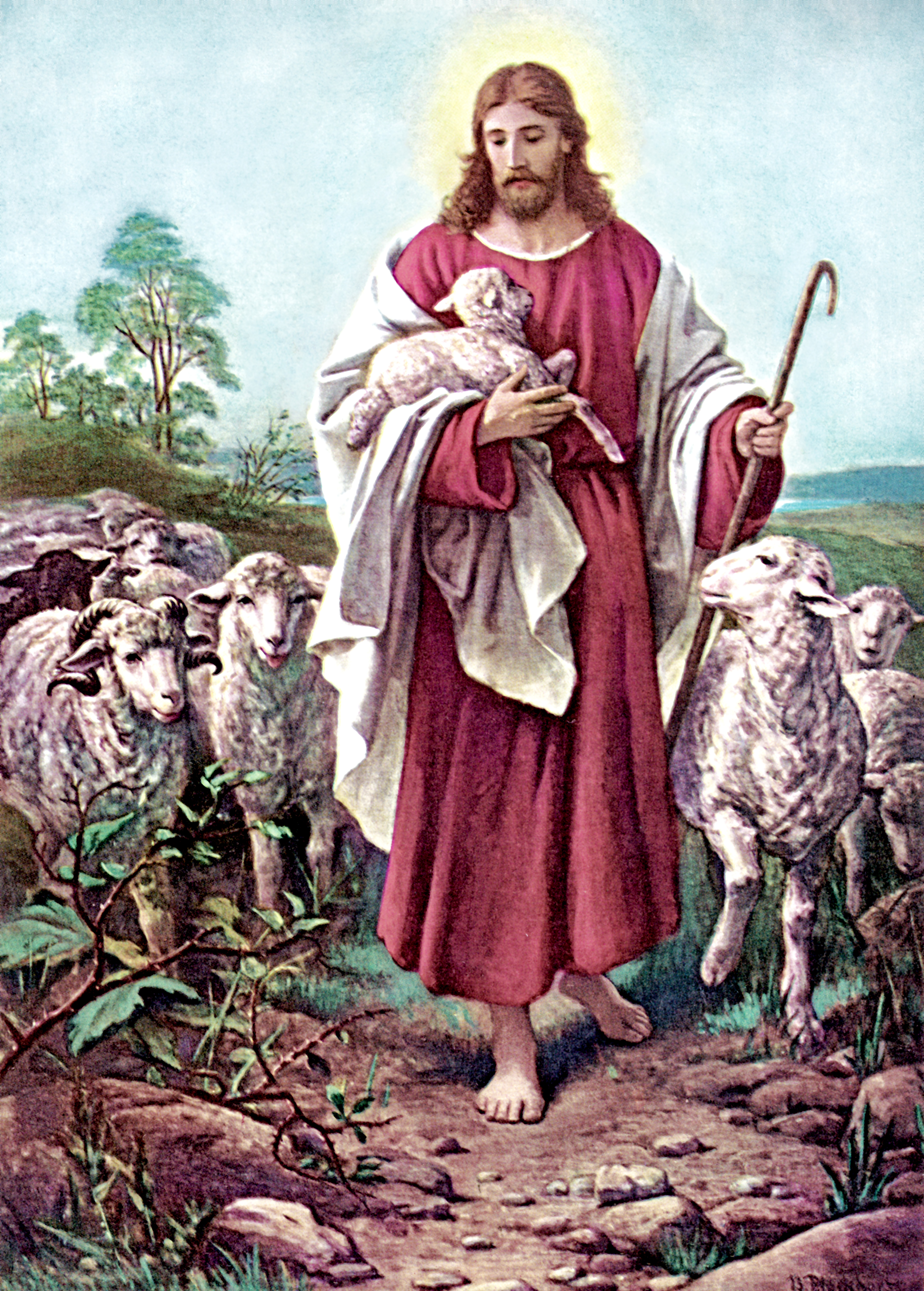
19th century by German Artist Bernard Plockhorst

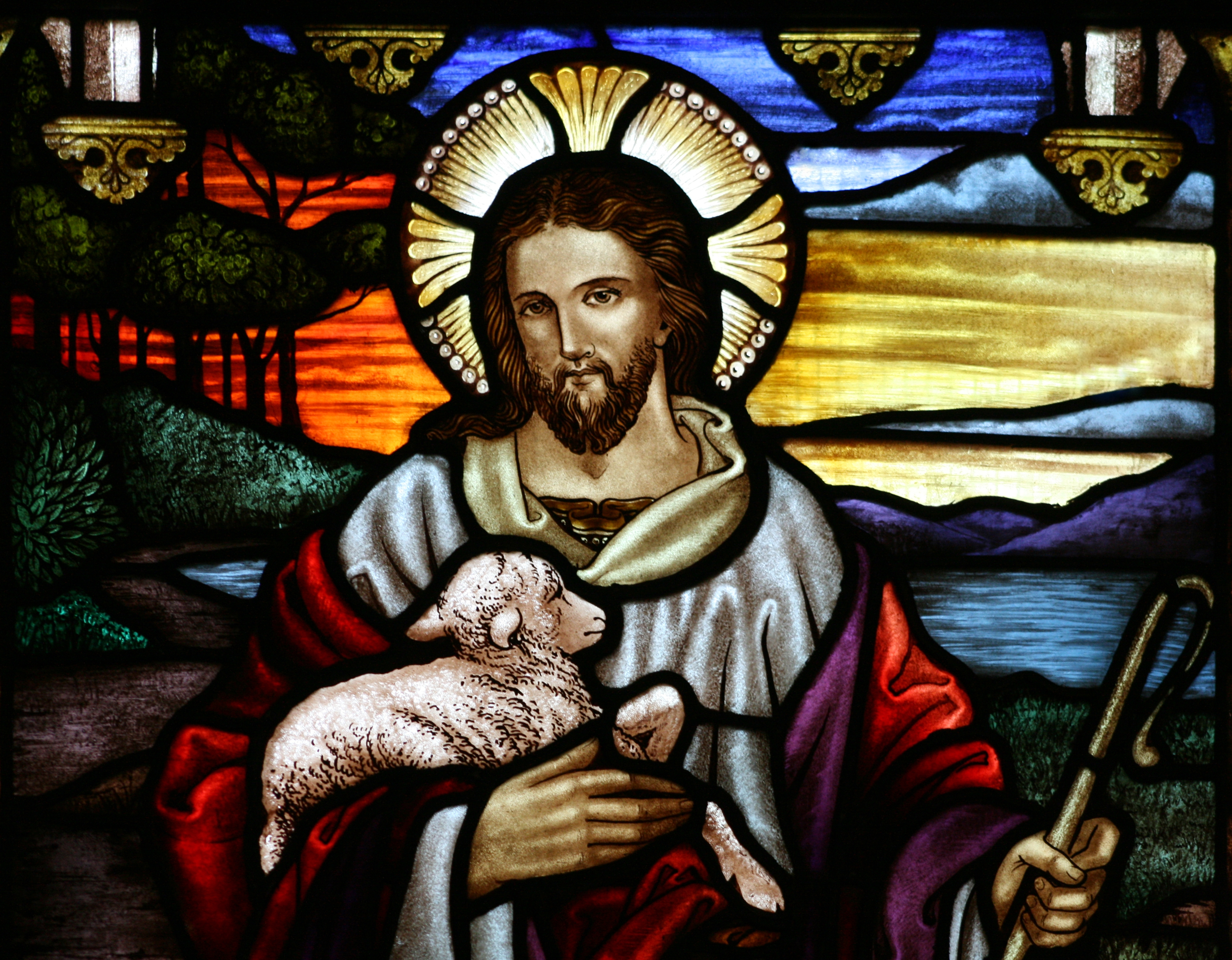
20th-century stained glass depiction, Australia

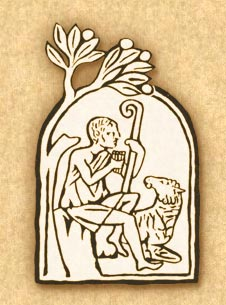
Emblem of the Catechism of the Catholic Church

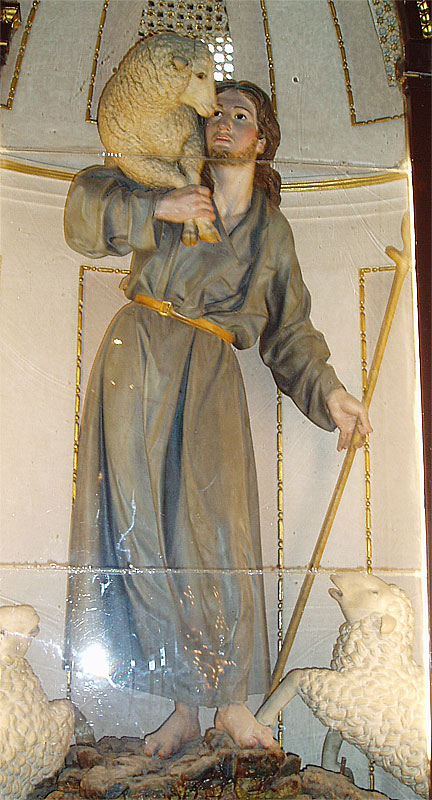
Oratorio de la Santa Cueva. Cádiz, España

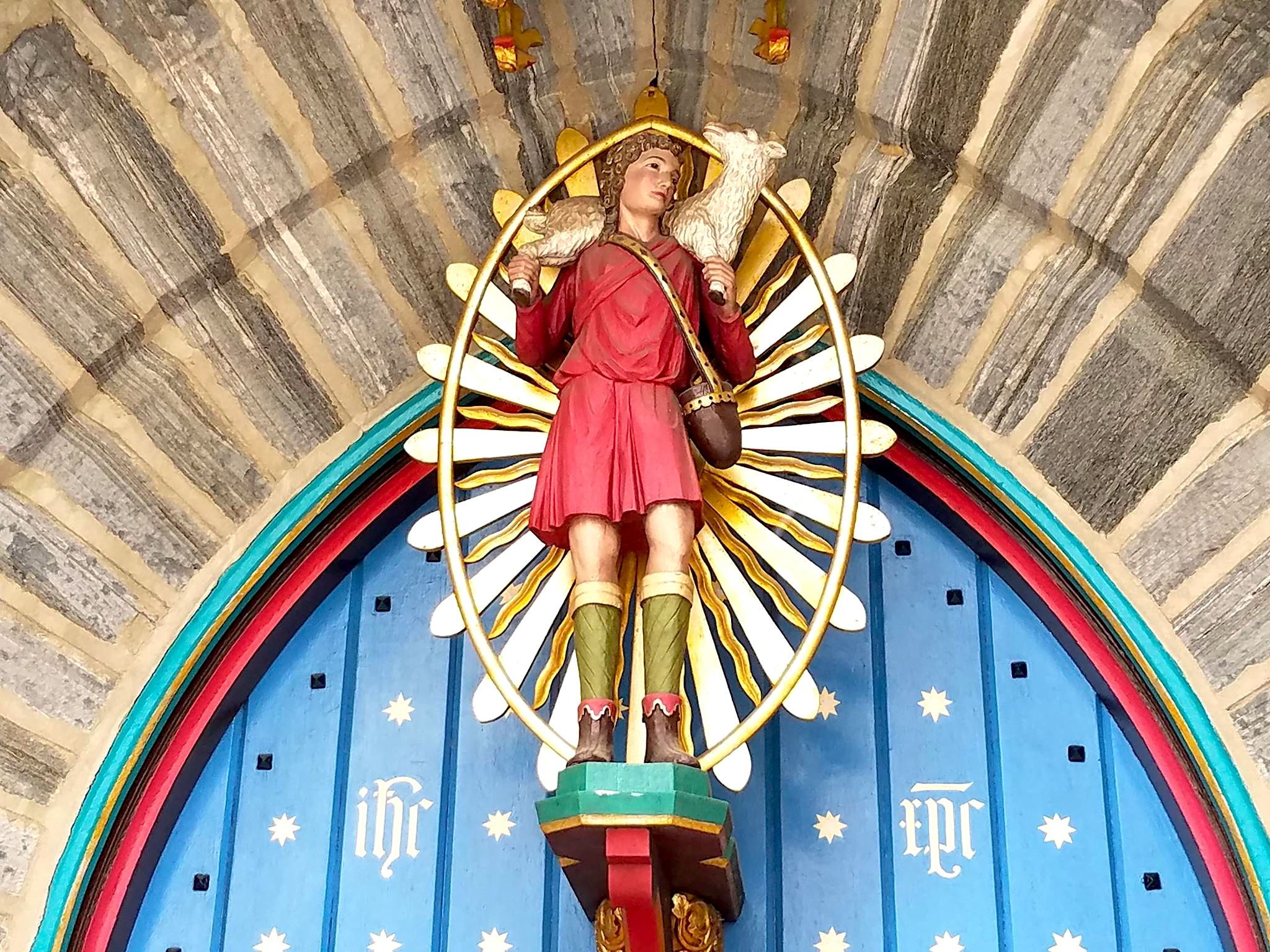
Jesus as a shepherd boy, Church of the Good Shepherd (Rosemont, Pennsylvania)

== See also ==
- Depictions of Jesus
- I am (biblical term)
- Lamb of God
- Names and titles of Jesus in the New Testament
- Parable of the Lost Sheep
- The Sheep and Goats
- Mausoleum of Galla Placidia
