= Statuette of the Good Shepherd =

Roman sculpture of Christ (3rd–4th century)

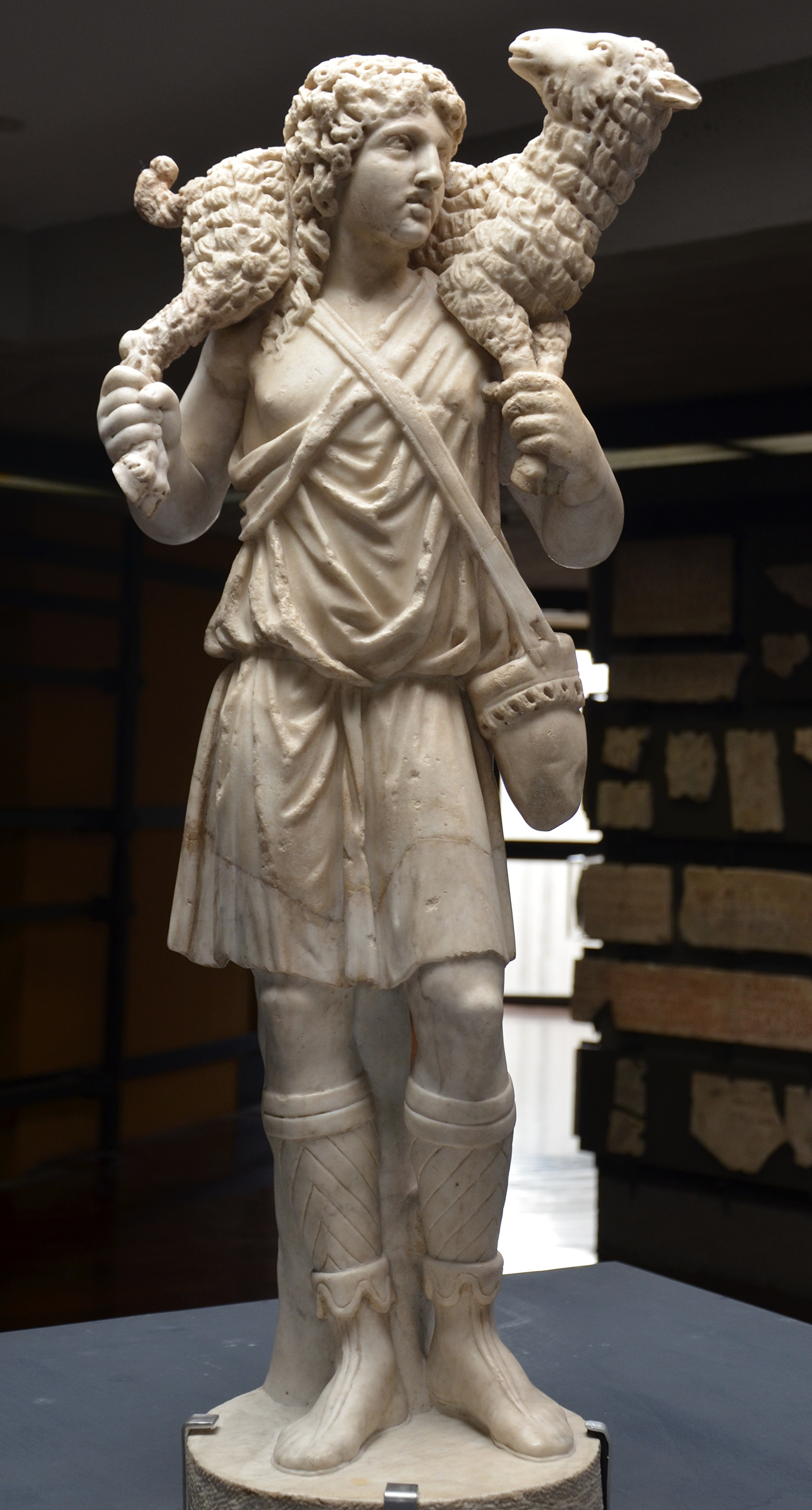
- Year: 3rd–4th century A.D., 18th century A.D.
- Subject: Good Shepherd, Christ
- Dimensions: 100 cm × 36 cm × 27 cm (39 in × 14 in × 11 in)
- Location: Vatican Museums, Museo Pio Cristiano; Vatican City
- Accession: 28590

The statuette of the Good Shepherd is a marble statuette formerly part of a sarcophagus that dates to the late third or early 4th century A.D. found in the Catacomb of Callixtus. It was reworked in 1764 to become an independent statuette. Above the base, the statue underwent restoration in the 18th century and partial recreation of missing sections. Parts reworked include the upper part of the head, the lamb's legs, the back of the statue, one of the shepherd's legs and both his arms.

The statuette illustrates Christ as the Good Shepherd, written of in the Bible's Parable of the Lost Sheep. From Luke 15, verses 3–7:

3 And he (Christ) spake this parable unto them, saying,
4 What man of you, having an hundred sheep, if he lose one of them, doth not leave the ninety and nine in the wilderness, and go after that which is lost, until he find it?
5 And when he hath found it, he layeth it on his shoulders, rejoicing.
6 And when he cometh home, he calleth together his friends and neighbours, saying unto them, Rejoice with me; for I have found my sheep which was lost.
7 I say unto you, that likewise joy shall be in heaven over one sinner that repenteth, more than over ninety and nine just persons, which need no repentance.
