= Middle Passage (poem) =

Poem by Robert Hayden

"Middle Passage" is a poem by Robert Hayden. Hayden first published the poem in 1945 and revised it in 1962.

== Background and publication ==
The American poet Robert Hayden started researching with the intent of writing his poem in the late 1930s and started to write "Middle Passage" in 1941 and sought to include it in The Black Spear, an "epic sequence" of poetry inspired by Stephen Vincent Benét's work John Brown’s Body. Hayden based the poem in part on The Waste Land by T. S. Eliot. He first published the poem in Phylon in 1945. He significantly revised it for publication in his 1962 A Ballad of Remembrance. "Middle Passage" is the "centerpiece" of A Ballad of Remembrance, and that collection is considered to have played a large role in increasing Hayden's reputation as a poet. It was then republished in several of Hayden's other anthologies with minor revisions, including Selected Poems (1966) and Angle of Ascent (1975).

== Content and revision ==
Hayden said that in writing the poem he sought to “contribute toward an understanding of what our [African-American] past had really been like”. He was likely influenced by the recent World War II and The Holocaust. "Middle Passage" follows the transatlantic slave trade and is focused on the events surrounding the mutiny on La Amistad in July 1839. Hayden sought to redefine African-American history through his poem.

The original version of the poem has some typographical errors and mistakes in how it was set. In revising the poem, Hayden made it around forty-three lines shorter.

== Reception ==
Most critical analysis has focused on Hayden's revised version of "Middle Passage". While A Ballad of Remembrance received relatively little note upon publication, scholarly attention grew in the years that followed, winning the 1966 Grand Prix de la Poésie at the first World Festival of Negro Arts. The poem has generally been well received. It has been described as an "anti-epic" for taking many key features present in epic poetry and inverting them.
