= Museo Pio Cristiano =

Vatican museum

Coordinates: 41.9065°N 12.4538°E

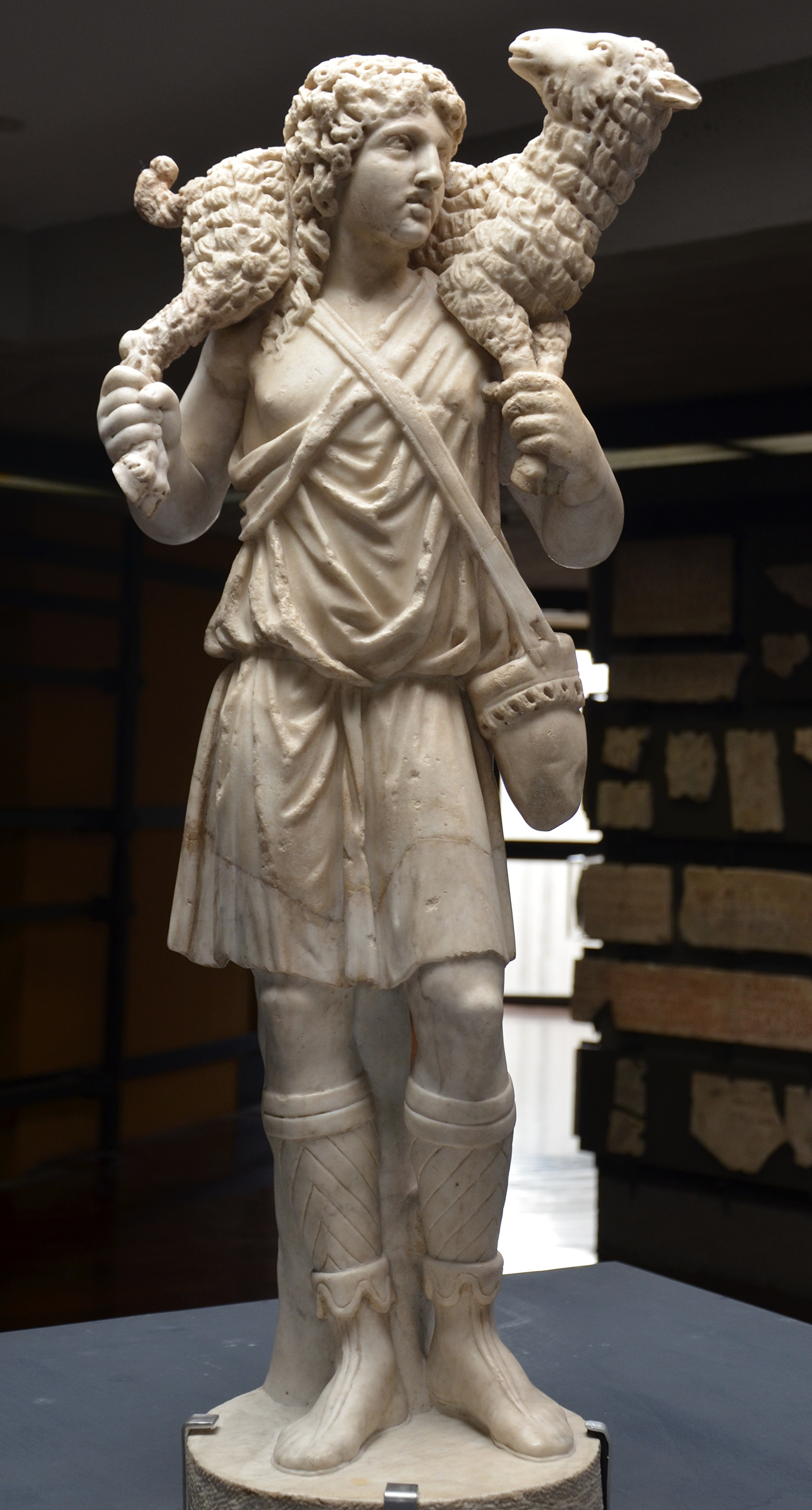
The Good Shepherd. Though the base is a fragment of a lost 3rd century early Christian sarcophagus, most of the work is an 18th century restoration and recreation, including the upper part of the head, the lamb's legs, the back of the statue, one of the shepherd's legs and both his arms.

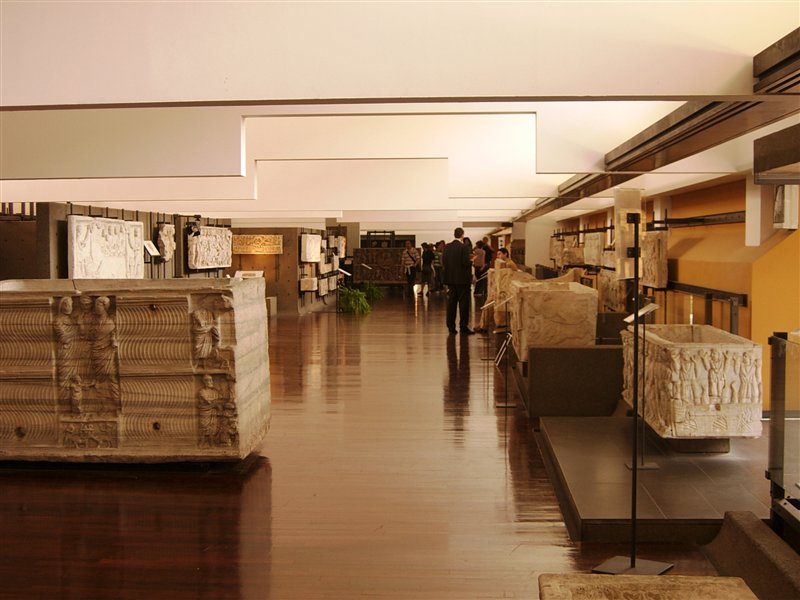
Its galleries.

The Museo Pio Cristiano is one of the Vatican Museums. It houses various works of Christian antiquity such as The Good Shepherd.

The museum was founded by Pope Pius IX in 1854, two years after the establishment of the Pontifical Commission for Sacred Archaeology by Giuseppe Marchi and Giovanni Battista de Rossi. That Commission's intended aim was to excavate and conserve the catacombs of Rome. Its collections are made up of excavated items which could not be conserved on their original sites.

It is divided into two halves

- architectural monuments, sculptures and mosaics, with a particularly strong collection of early-Christian sarcophagi (open to the public)
- inscriptions, subdivided by era and subject (only open to scholars)

== See also ==
- Vatican Gallery of Maps
