= Jesus as myth =

Jesus as myth may refer to:

- Christ myth theory, the position that Jesus is a figure constructed from various mythologies
- Jesus Christ in comparative mythology, examination of similarities between the figure of Jesus and figures in various ancient mythologies

== See also ==
- Historicity of Jesus
- Historical Jesus
- Jesus
- Cultural and historical background of Jesus
