= Moschophoros =

Ancient Greek sculpture from the Acropolis of Athens

- μοσχοφόρος (Greek)
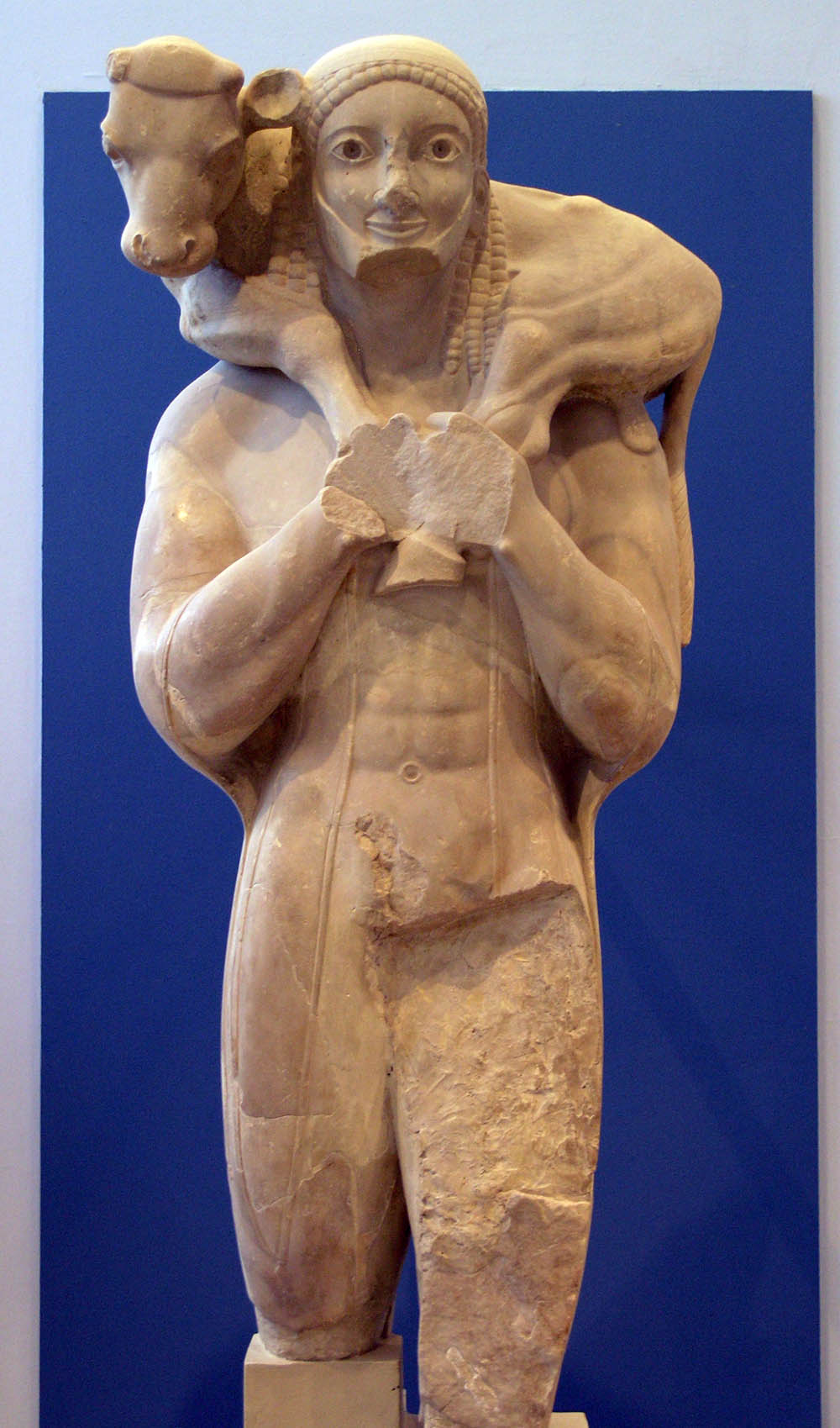
- Year: c. 560 BC
- Medium: Limestone
- Subject: A man carrying a sacrificial animal
- Dimensions: 165 cm (5.41 ft)
- Location: Acropolis Museum; Athens, Greece

Moschophoros (Greek: μοσχοφόρος "calf-bearer") is an ancient Greek statue of the Archaic period, also known in English as The Calf Bearer. It was excavated in fragments in the Perserschutt on the Acropolis of Athens in 1864. The statue, dated c. 560 BC and estimated to have originally measured 1.65 meters (5.4 ft) in height, is now in the Acropolis Museum in Athens, Greece.

== Description ==
The Moschophoros stands with his left foot a little forward, like a kouros. He has a thick beard, a symbol of adulthood. He wears a thin cloak. The sculpture's nudity is the main aspect of the art as it adhered to the artistic conventions of the era. The cloak on the other hand, depicts him as a respectable and well-recognized citizen.

The challenge of representing man and animal together is successfully accomplished by this Archaic sculpture. The calf's legs are held firmly, making a bold X-shaped composition. This interaction between the calf and the calf-bearer represents a strong, inseparable bond between the two. The man in the sculpture is smiling, in a feature referred to as the Archaic smile, which began in the 6th century BC.

Moschophoros's hair is very curly, encircling his forehead. There are three plaits on each side falling over his chest. The hair at the top is tied with a narrow ribbon. He has a thick beard that curves around his shaved upper and lower lip. The eyes are large and were made out of colored stones. The stones are absent now but it gave a more lively appeal to the statue before. His mouth is very diligently carved and outlined.

The form and style indicate a date in the early 6th century BC, around 570 BC.

Kriophoros statues of a man with a ram on his shoulders in a similar manner, are more common.

== Condition ==
The condition of the Moschophoros is poor and broken in some areas. The legs are missing below the knees on both sides. The hands are broken off. The genitals and the left thigh have separated from the whole sculpture. The lower half of the face (the chin area) is chipped off. The foot with a plinth is connected to base. The calf is well preserved, while Moschophoros's eyes are absent. The rest of the sculpture is in a fine state.

== History ==
The sculpture was found on the Athenian Acropolis in 1864. In 1887, the base was discovered. It is made of permeable limestone, and its plinth was attached to the right foot of the sculpture.

The inscription on that plinth claims that this statue was dedicated by someone named Rhombos (possibly Kombos or Bombos; the beginning of the name is missing). The dedication is often said to be for Athena, but because it is a male calf, a male deity such as Zeus Polieus or Erechtheus is more likely. This suggests that the sponsor was a very well-to-do-man and a prominent citizen of Attica, who offered his own likeness to the deity. He has a calf on his shoulders which represents the sacrificial offering he is about to give to the god.

== See also ==
- Kriophoros — "ram-bearer".
- Kritios boy
