= Kriophoros =

Epithet of Hermes as ram-bearer

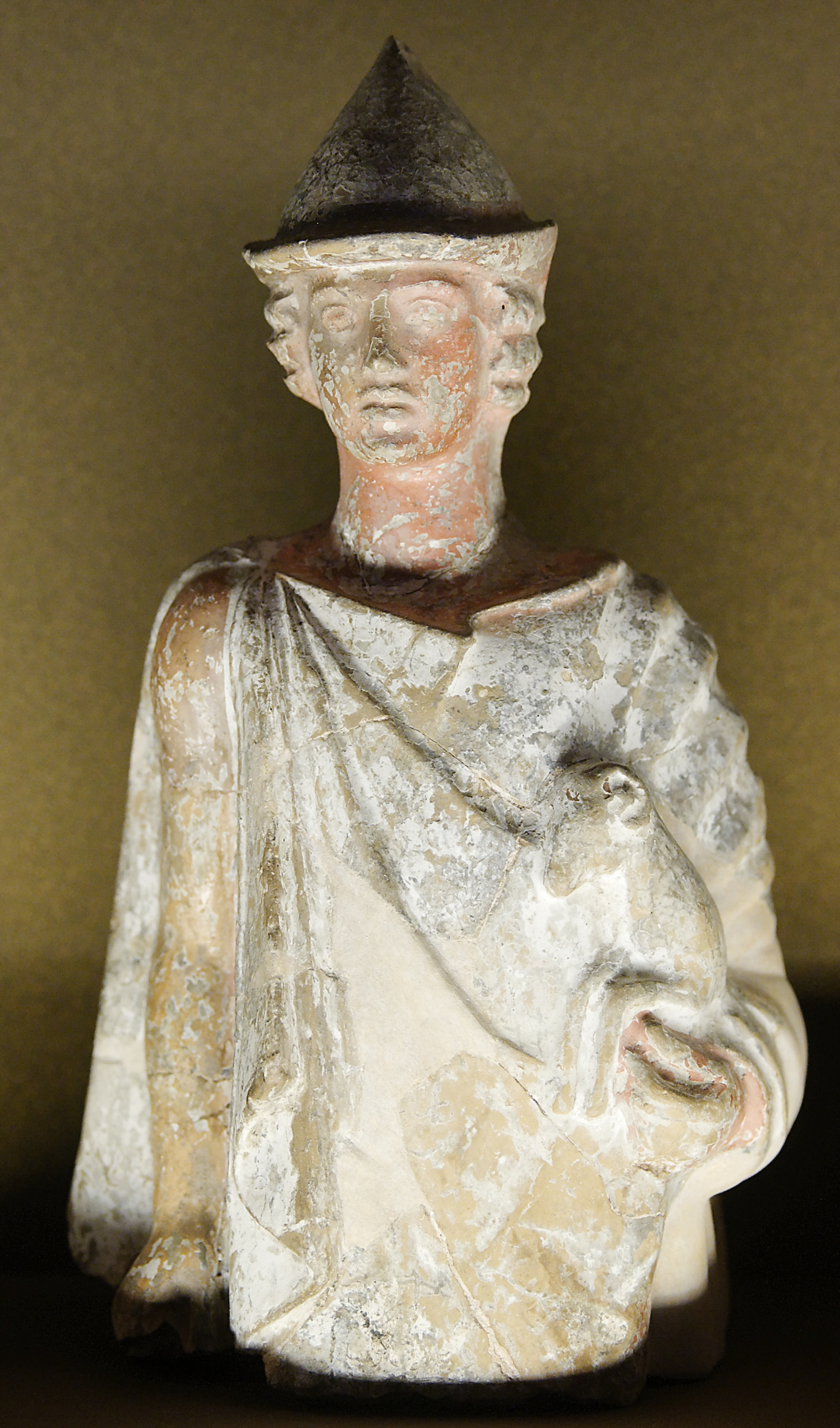
Painted terracotta cult image of the Kriophoros from Thebes in Boeotia, c. 450 BCE (Musée du Louvre)

In ancient Greek religion, kriophoros (Greek: κριοφόρος) or criophorus, the "ram-bearer," is a figure of Hermes that commemorates the solemn sacrifice of a ram; thus, one of the god's epithets is Hermes Kriophoros.

== Myth ==
At the Boeotian city of Tanagra, Pausanias relates a local myth that credited the god with saving the city in a time of plague, by carrying a ram on his shoulders as he made the circuit of the city's walls:

There are sanctuaries of Hermes Kriophoros and of Hermes called Promachos. (Note: Promachos, "first in battle, champion"; compare Athena Promachos.) They account for the former surname by a story that Hermes averted a pestilence from the city by carrying a ram round the walls; to commemorate this Calamis made an image of Hermes carrying a ram upon his shoulders. Whichever of the youths is judged to be the most handsome goes round the walls at the feast of Hermes, carrying a lamb on his shoulders.

The myth may be providing an etiological explanation of a cult practice, carried out to avert miasma, the ritual pollution that had brought disease, a propitiatory act whose ancient origins had become lost but had ossified in this iconic motif. Reflections of Calamis' lost Hermes Kriophoros may be detectable on the Roman coinage of the city.

In Messenia, at the sacred grove of Karnasus, Pausanias noted that Apollon Karneios and Hermes Kriophoros had a joint cult, the ram-bearers (kriophoroi) joining in male initiation rites.

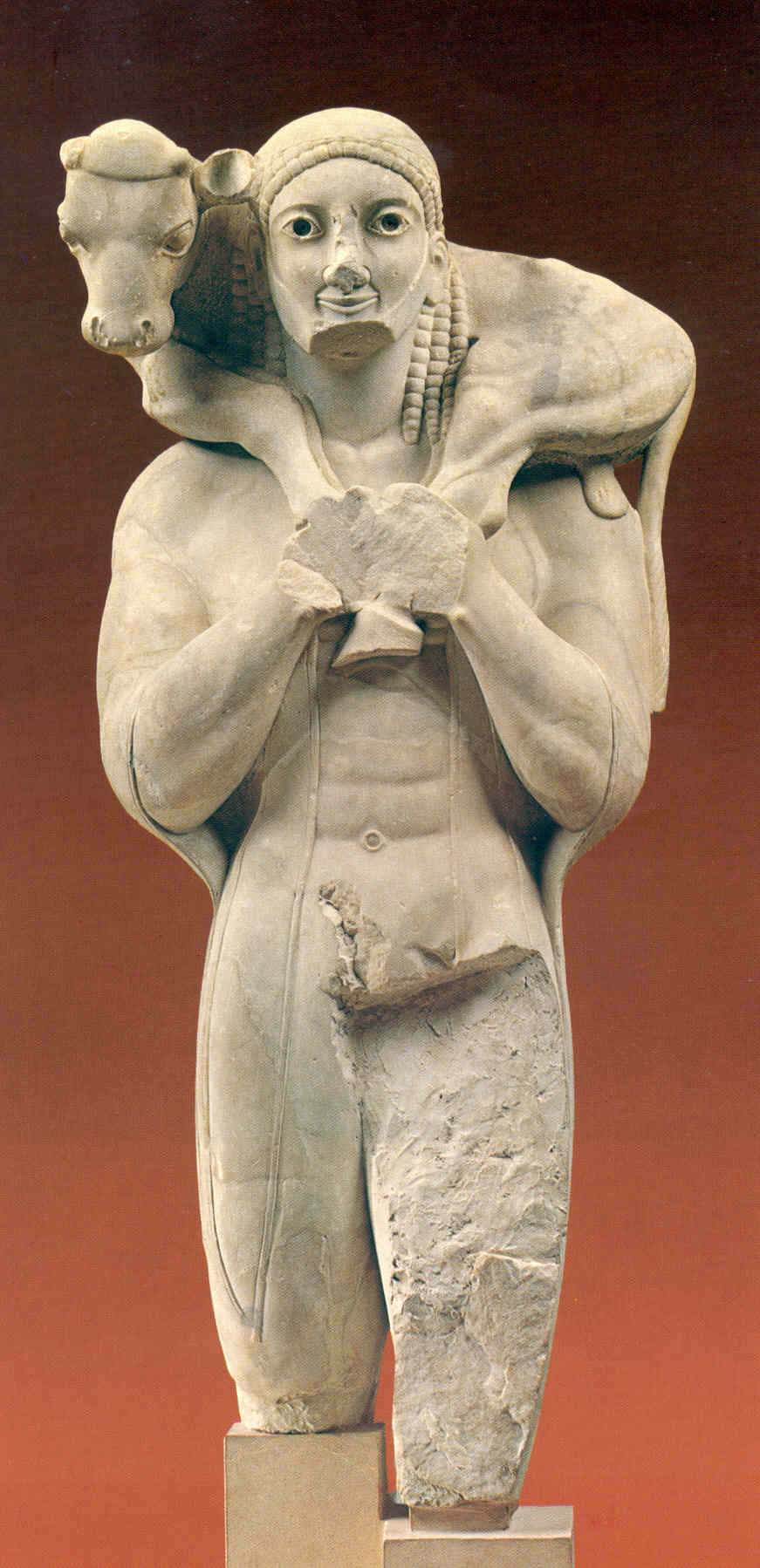
The Moscophoros of the Acropolis, c. 570 BC

A description by Pausanias of a Kriophoros dedicated at Olympia, by the sculptor Onatas, has been compared by José Dörig with a surviving bronze statuette, 8.6 cm (3.4 in) tall, in the Cabinet des Médailles, Paris, as a basis for reconstructing the Severe style of the sculptor.

Not all ancient Greek sculptures of sacrifiants with an offering on their shoulders bear young rams. The nearly lifesize marble Moscophoros ("The Calf Bearer") of c. 570 BCE, found on the Athenian Acropolis in 1864 is inscribed "Rhombos", apparently the donor, who commemorated his sacrifice in this manner. The sacrificial animal in the case is a young bull, but the iconic pose, with the young animal across the sacrifiant's shoulders, secured by forelegs and rear legs firmly in the sacrifiant's grip, is the same as many kriophoroi. This is the most famous of the Kriophoros sculptures and is exhibited at the Acropolis Museum

Lewis R. Farnell placed this Hermes Kriophoros foremost in Arcadia:

As Arcadia has been from time immemorial the great pasture-ground of Greece, so probably the most primitive character in which Hermes appeared, and which he never abandoned, was pastoral. He is the Lord of the herds, epimélios (Note: This epithet belonged to Apollo at Camirus.) and kriophoros, who leads them to the sweet waters, and bears the tired ram or lamb on his shoulders, and assists them with the shepherd's crook, the kerykeion.

The Kriophoros figure of a shepherd carrying a lamb, simply as a pastoral vignette, became a common figure in series denoting the months or seasons, characteristically March or April.

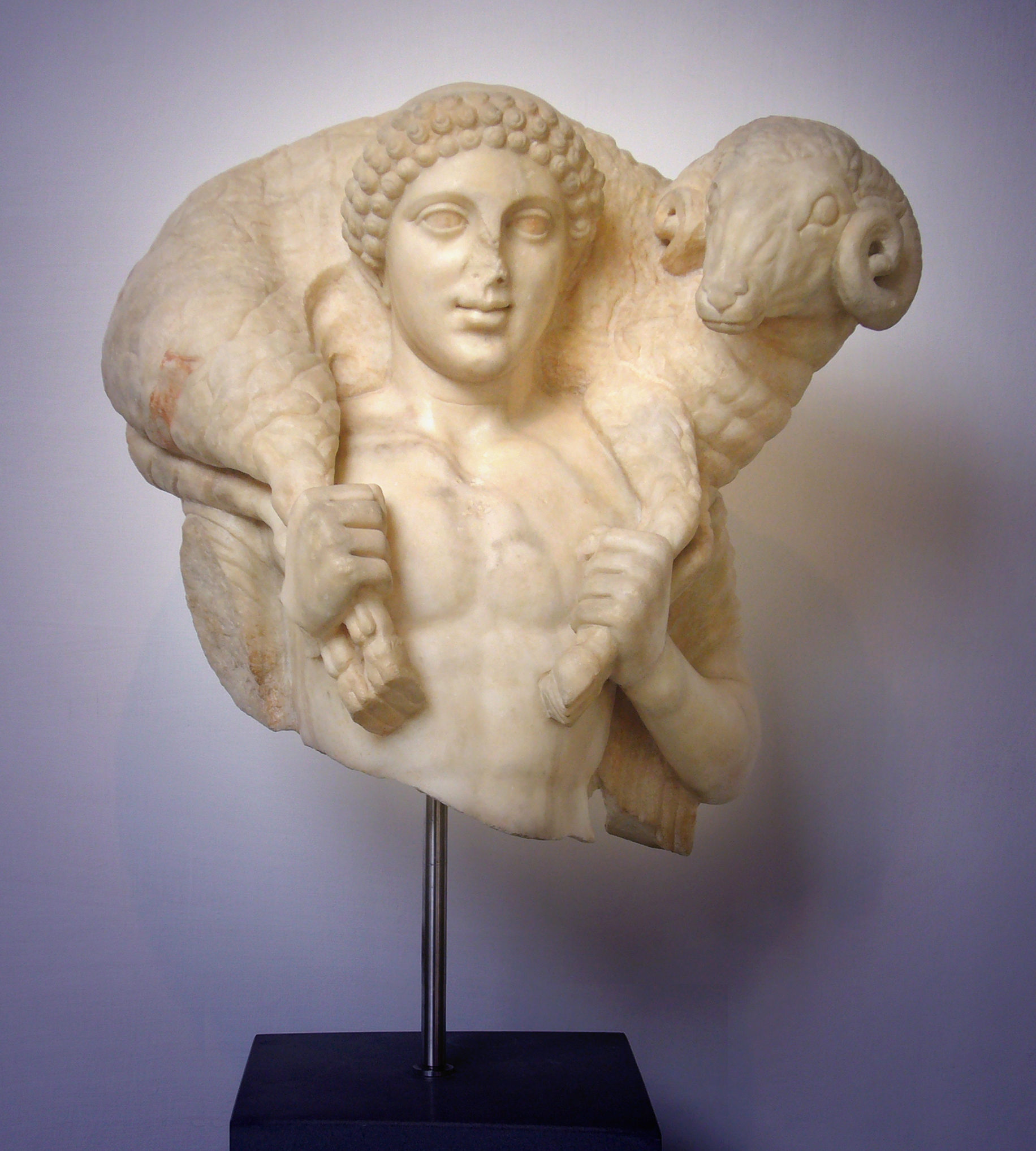
Late Roman marble copy of the Kriophoros of Kalamis (Museo Barracco, Rome)

== Kriophoroi and "The Good Shepherd" ==
Free-standing fourth-century CE Roman sculptures, and even third-century ones, are sometimes identified as "Christ, the Good Shepherd", illustrating the pericope in the Gospel of John, and also the second-century Christian literary work The Shepherd of Hermas. In two-dimensional art, Hermes Kriophoros transformed into the Christ carrying a lamb and walking among his sheep: "Thus we find philosophers holding scrolls or a Hermes Kriophoros which can be turned into Christ giving the Law (Traditio Legis) and the Good Shepherd respectively" The Good Shepherd is a common motif from the Catacombs of Rome (Gardner, 10, fig 54) and in sarcophagus reliefs, where Christian and pagan symbolism are often combined, making secure identifications difficult. The theme does appear in the wall-paintings of the baptistery of the Dura-Europos church, a house-church at Dura-Europos before 256 CE, and more familiarly in sixth-century Christian mosaics, as in the Mausoleum of Galla Placidia at Ravenna, and there is a famous free-standing sculpture, said to be of about 300 CE, and made for a Christian, in the Vatican Museums.

Not every Kriophoros, even in Christian times, is Christ, the Good Shepherd. A Kriophoros shepherd, fleeing with his flock from the attack of a wolf, was interpreted as a purely pastoral figure in the 4th-5th century floor mosaics of a colonnade in Great Palace at Constantinople. Nonetheless, "the shepherd must have been the picture most frequently found in [Christian] places of worship before Constantine," as the most common of the symbolic depictions of Jesus used during the persecution of Christians under the Roman Empire, when Early Christian art was necessarily furtive and ambiguous. By the fifth century, the relatively few depictions leave no doubt as to the identity of the shepherd, as at Ravenna.
