= Barracco =

Barracco may refer to:

- Museo di Scultura Antica Giovanni Barracco, a museum in Rome, Italy
- Alfonso Barracco, an Italian politician
