= Alfonso Barracco =

Italian politician

Alfonso Barracco (Crotone, 17 March 1810 – Naples, 15 January 1890) was an Italian politician. He served in the Chamber of Deputies of the Kingdom of Sardinia.
