= Museo di Scultura Antica Giovanni Barracco =

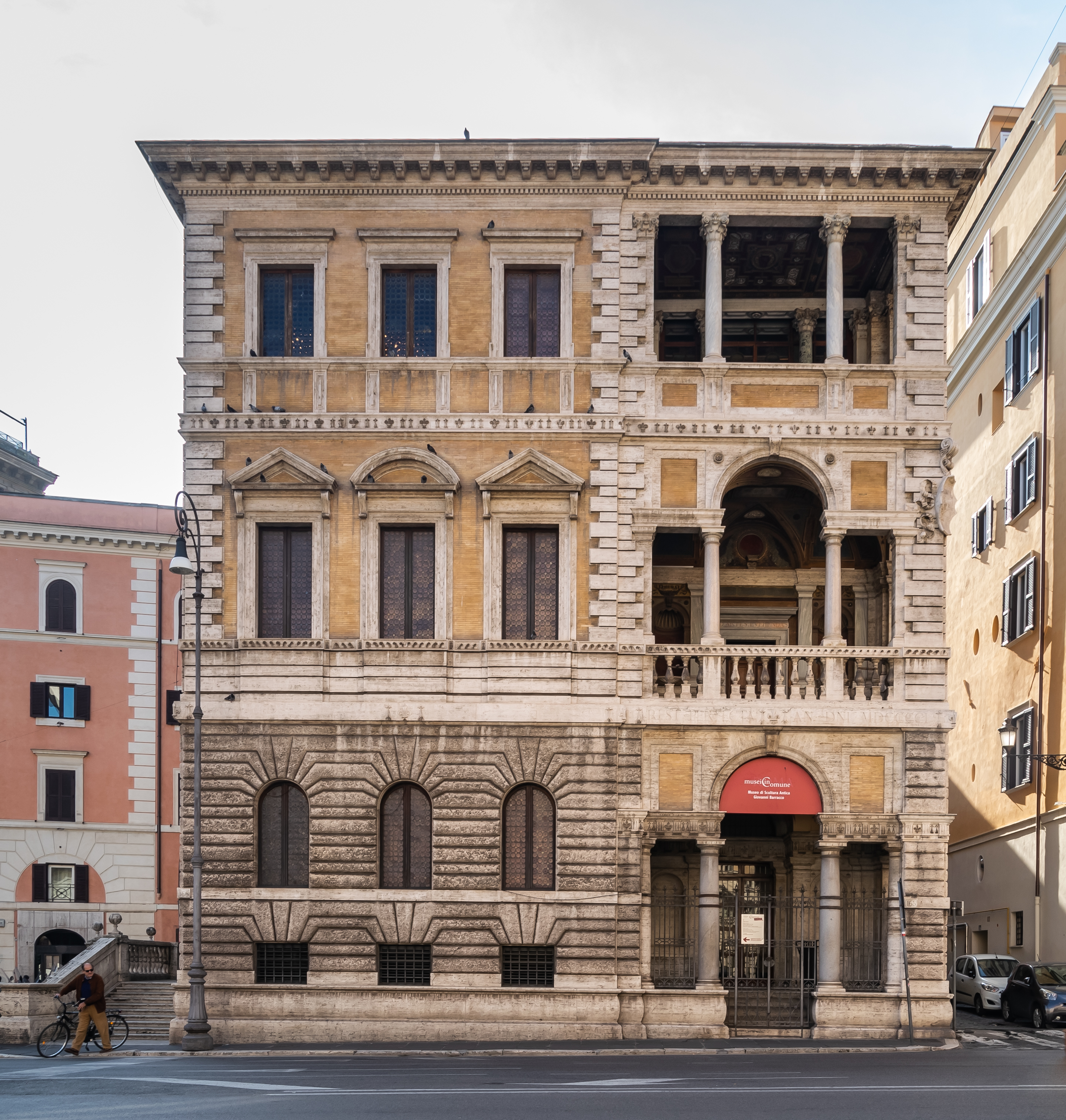
- The Palazzetto Le Roy houses the museum
- Click on the map for a fullscreen view
- Established: 1948
- Location: Corso Vittorio Emanuele, 166/A 00186 Rome, Italy
- Coordinates: 41°53′48.4″N 12°28′21.4″E
- Type: Art museum, Historic site
- Website: www.museobarracco.it

The Museo di Scultura Antica Giovanni Barracco (English: Giovanni Barracco Museum of Ancient Sculpture) is a museum in Rome that displays the antiquities collection of Giovanni Barracco. After amassing an impressive private collection throughout his travels as a member of the Italian Parliament, Barracco donated the works to the city of Rome in 1902. Since 1948, the collection has been housed in the Renaissance-era Palazzetto Le Roy, which has been expanded underground with archaeological excavations of an ancient Roman domus. Today, the museum remains part of the Sistema Musei di Roma Capitale and is free to the public.

== Museum ==
The museum boasts a diverse collection of sculpture from across the Mediterranean, including Egypt, Mesopotamia, Phoenicia, Cyprus, Greece, and Rome. The nearly 400 works in the museum's collection are displayed in galleries organized by region, with the first floor exhibiting the Mesopotamian, Egyptian, Assyrian, Phoenician, Cypriot, and Etruscan works and the second floor exhibiting Greek and Roman works. While the museum specializes in classical antiquity, a selection of medieval works and objects related to Barracco's lifelong interest in collecting antiquities are on display.

Upon entrance to the museum, visitors are greeted by a Roman sculpture of Apollo seated on a rock that was uncovered in the Horti Caesaris. In the reception atrium, visitors can enter a gallery displaying the personal belongings of Barracco, or enter into the archaeological site beneath the museum that displays an ancient Roman domus.

=== First floor ===
Original ceiling painting from the 17th century can be viewed from the first floor loggia. From here visitors can enter into a series of galleries that display works from the Near East, Cyprus, and Etruria. Egyptian works are presented in Rooms I and II. Room II includes works from Mesopotamia, including cuneiform tablets of the third millennium BCE and items from neo-Assyrian palaces dating from the ninth and seventh centuries BCE. The third room contains two important Phoenician items together with some Etruscan art, while the fourth displays works from Cyprus.

=== Second floor ===
The second floor exhibits classical art. Room V presents original sculptures and copies from the Roman period as well as Greek sculpture of the fifth century BCE. Room VI displays copies of classical and late classical Roman work, along with funerary sculptures from Greece. Rooms VII and VIII, show a collection of Greek and Italic ceramics, and other items, starting from the time of Alexander the Great. The final room shows examples of works from public monuments of the Roman period, together with specimens of medieval art.

== Collection ==
=== Egyptian ===
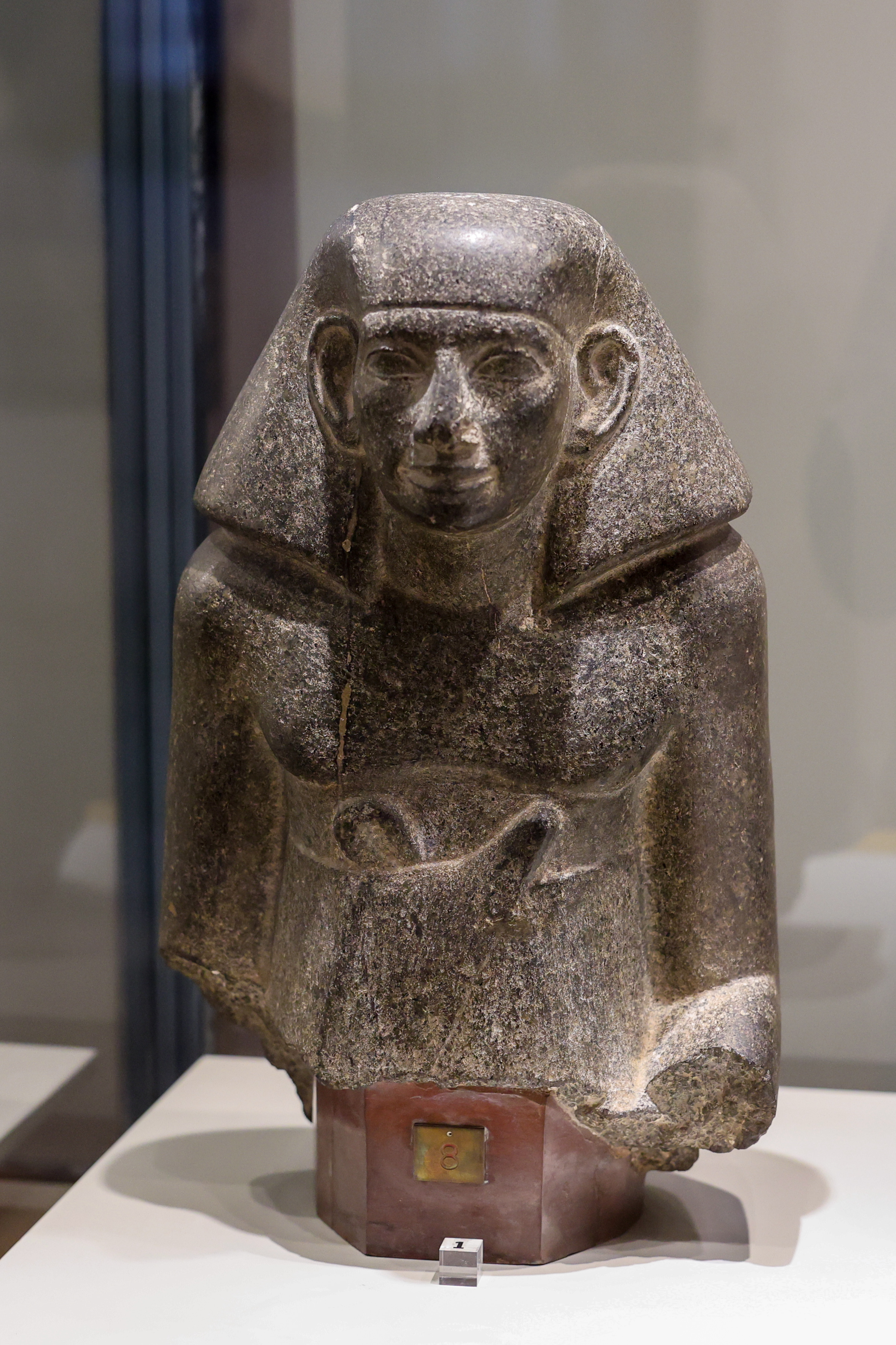

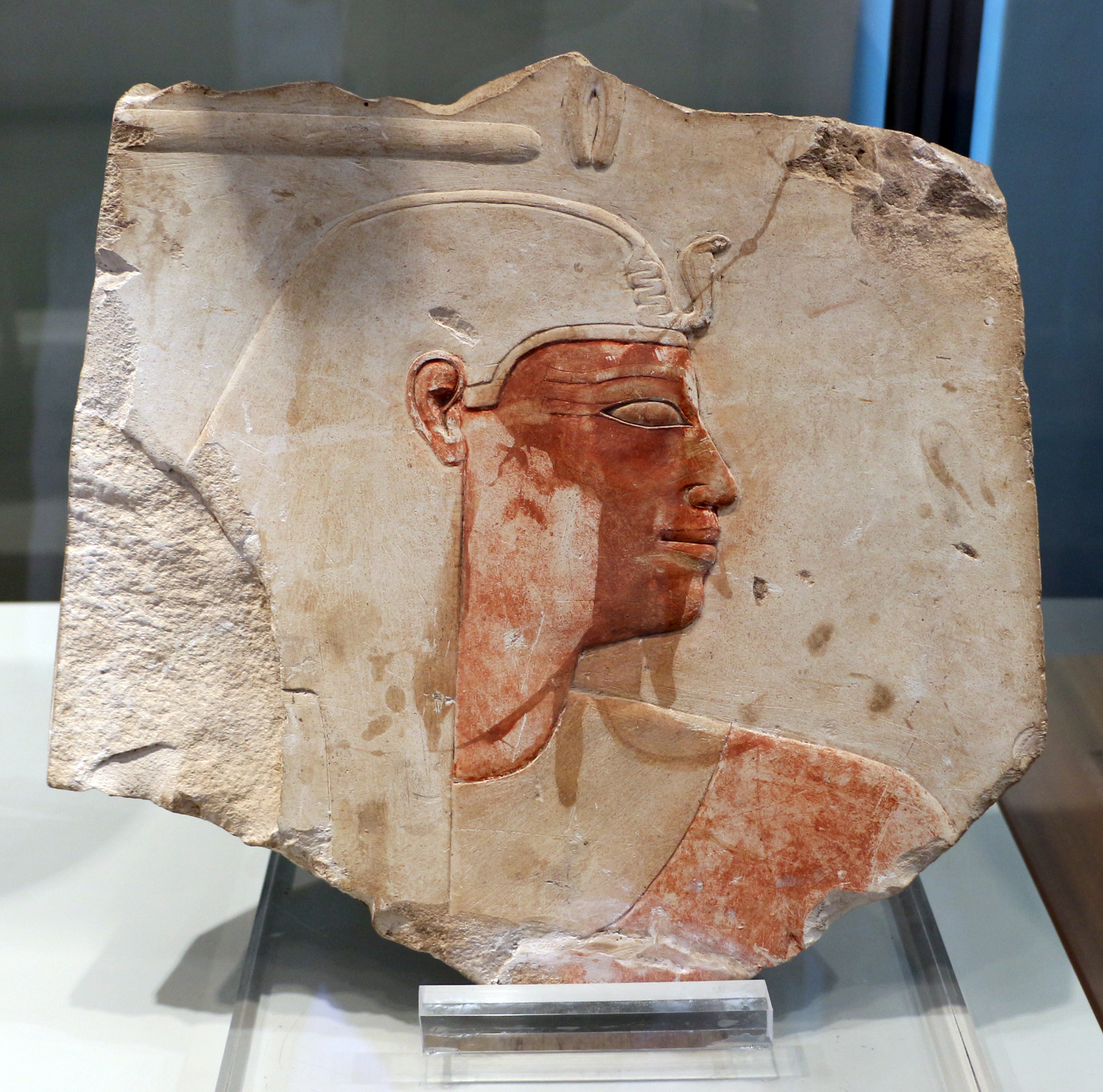

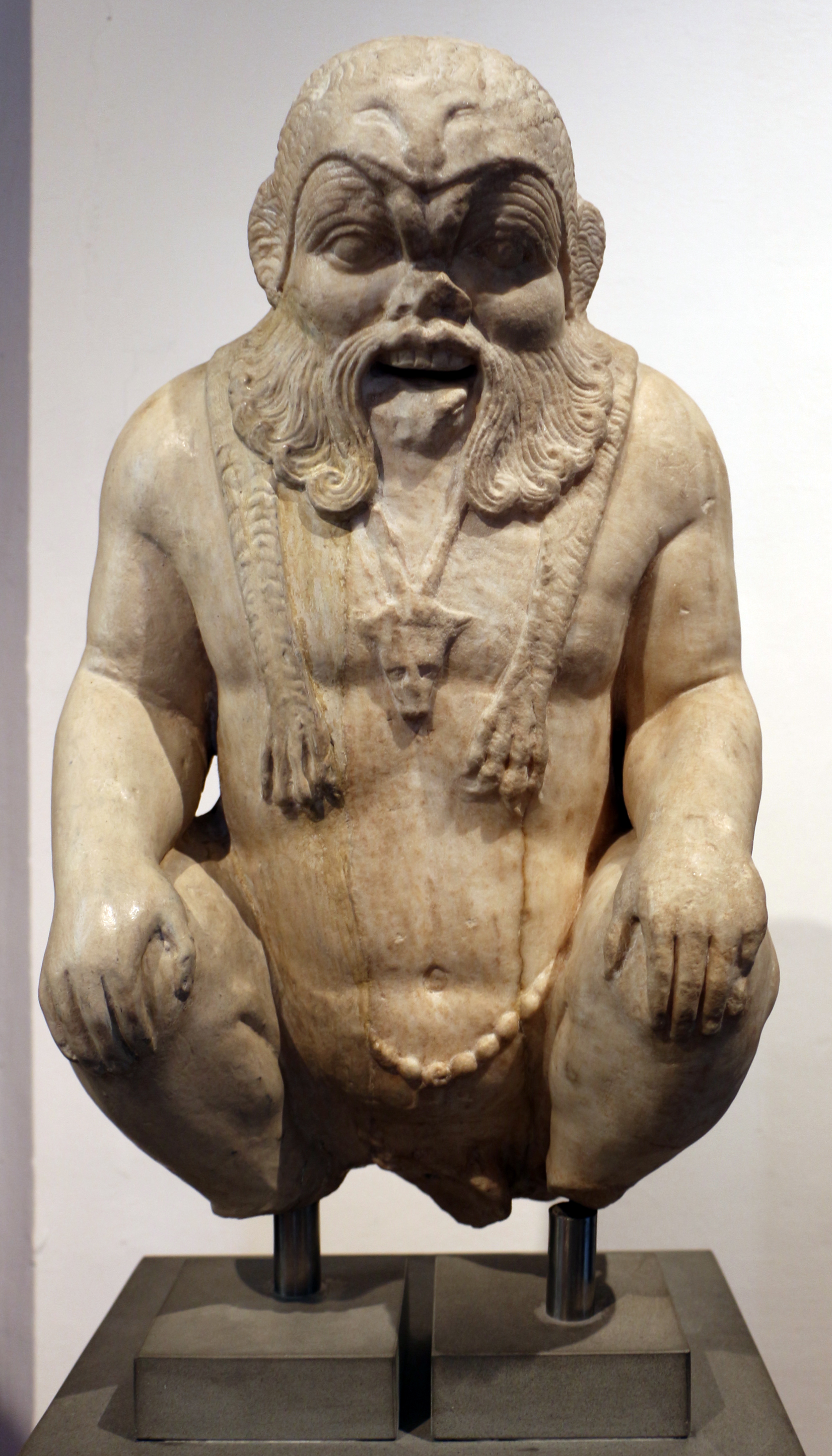

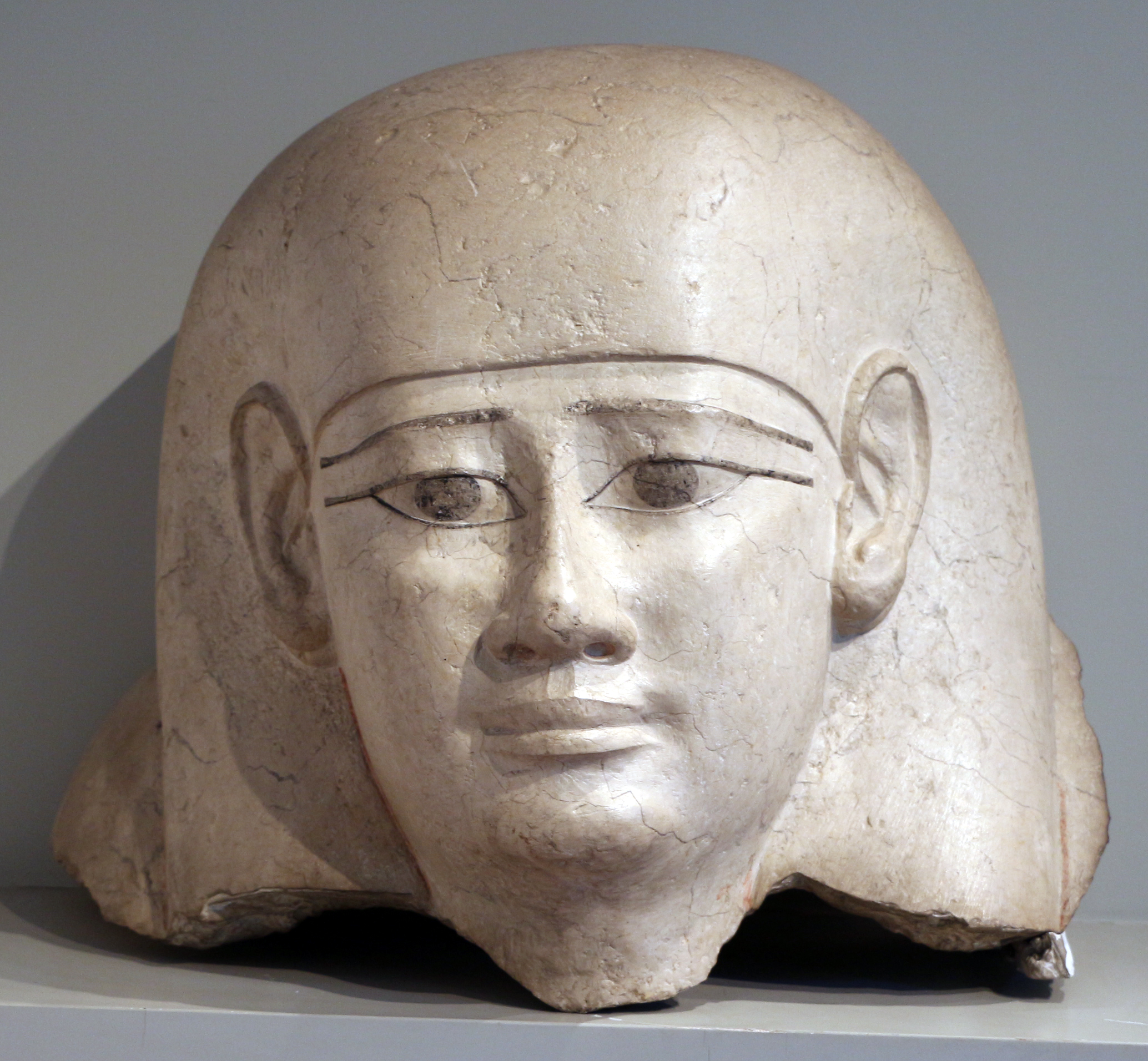

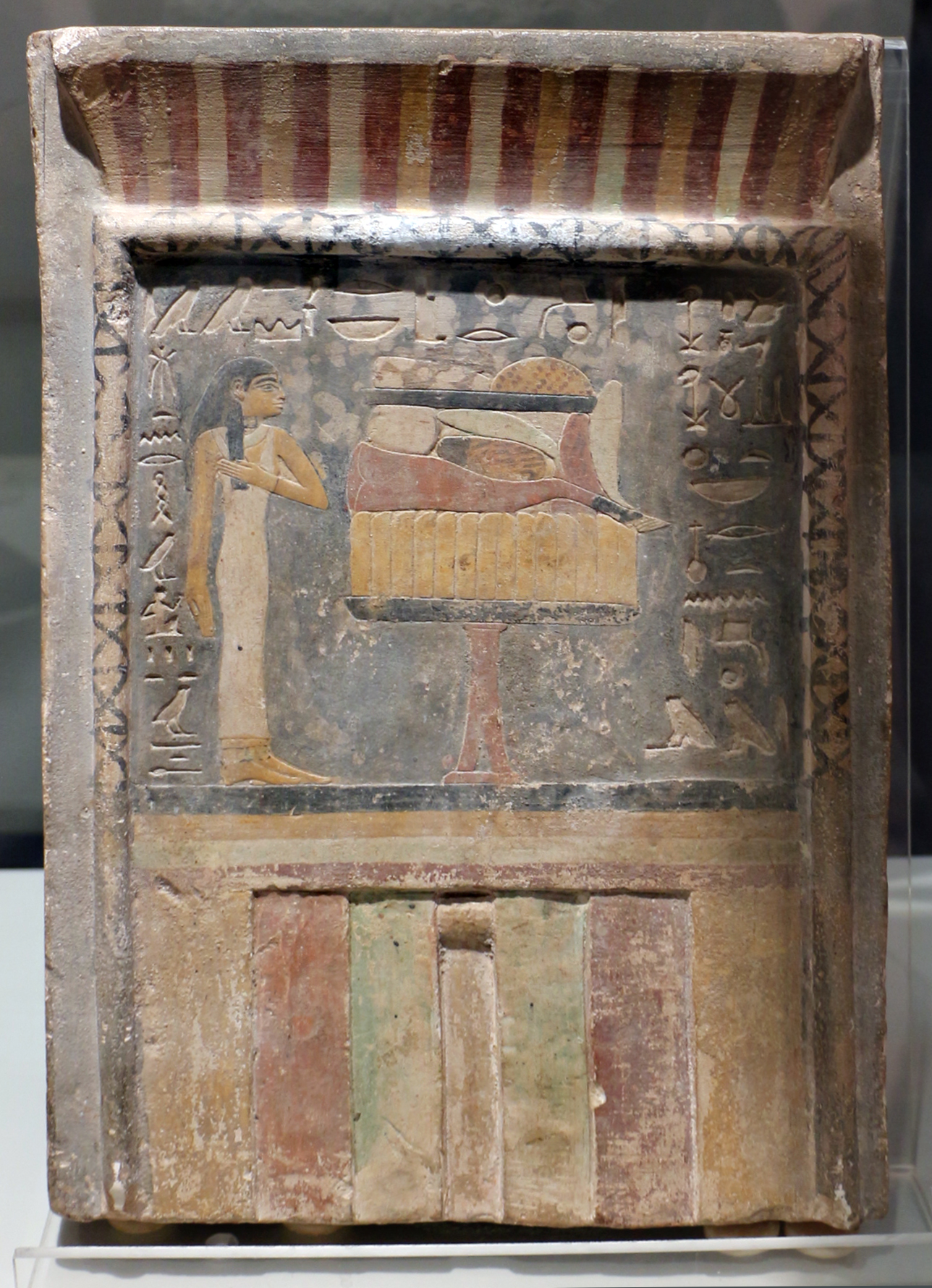

=== Cypriot ===
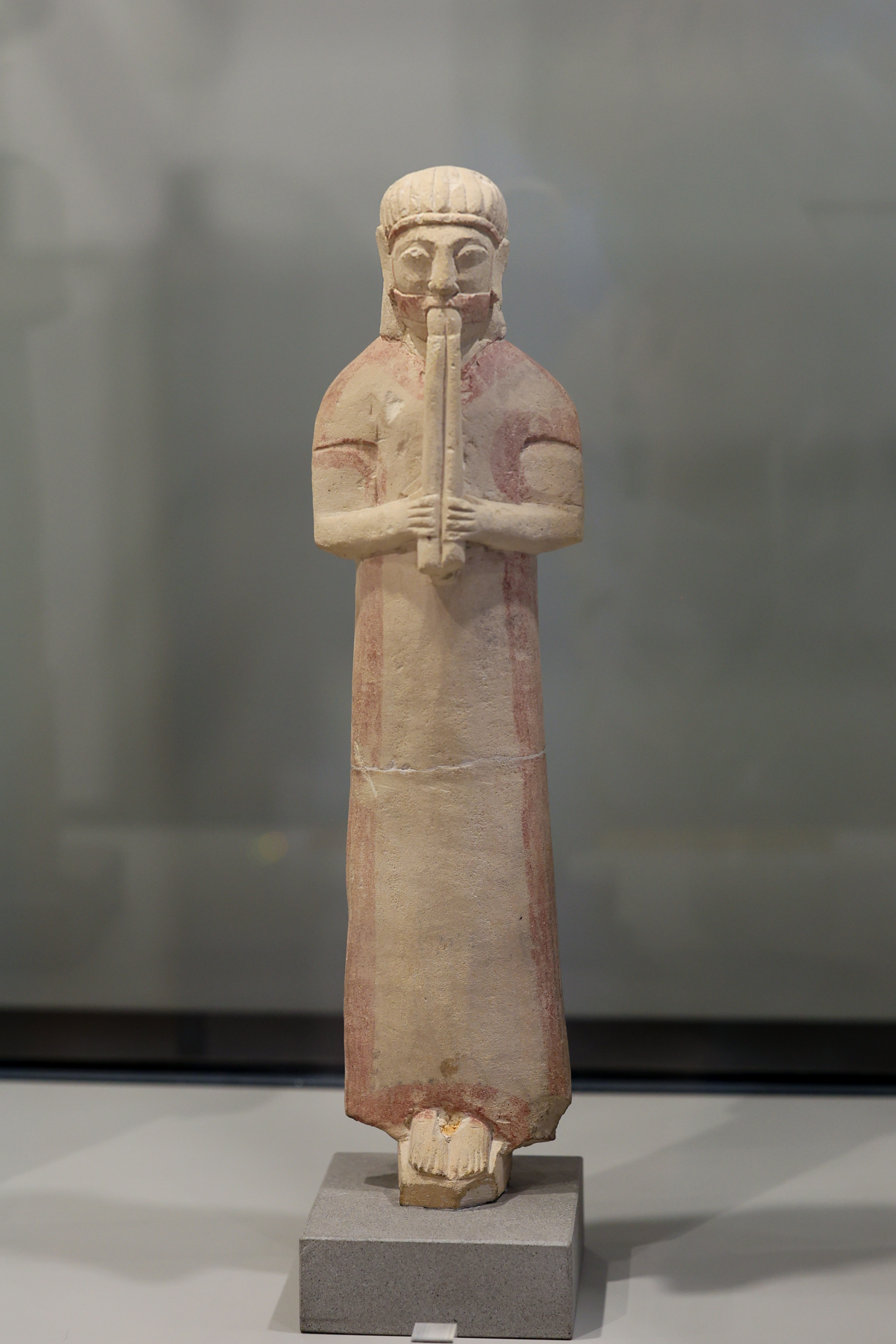

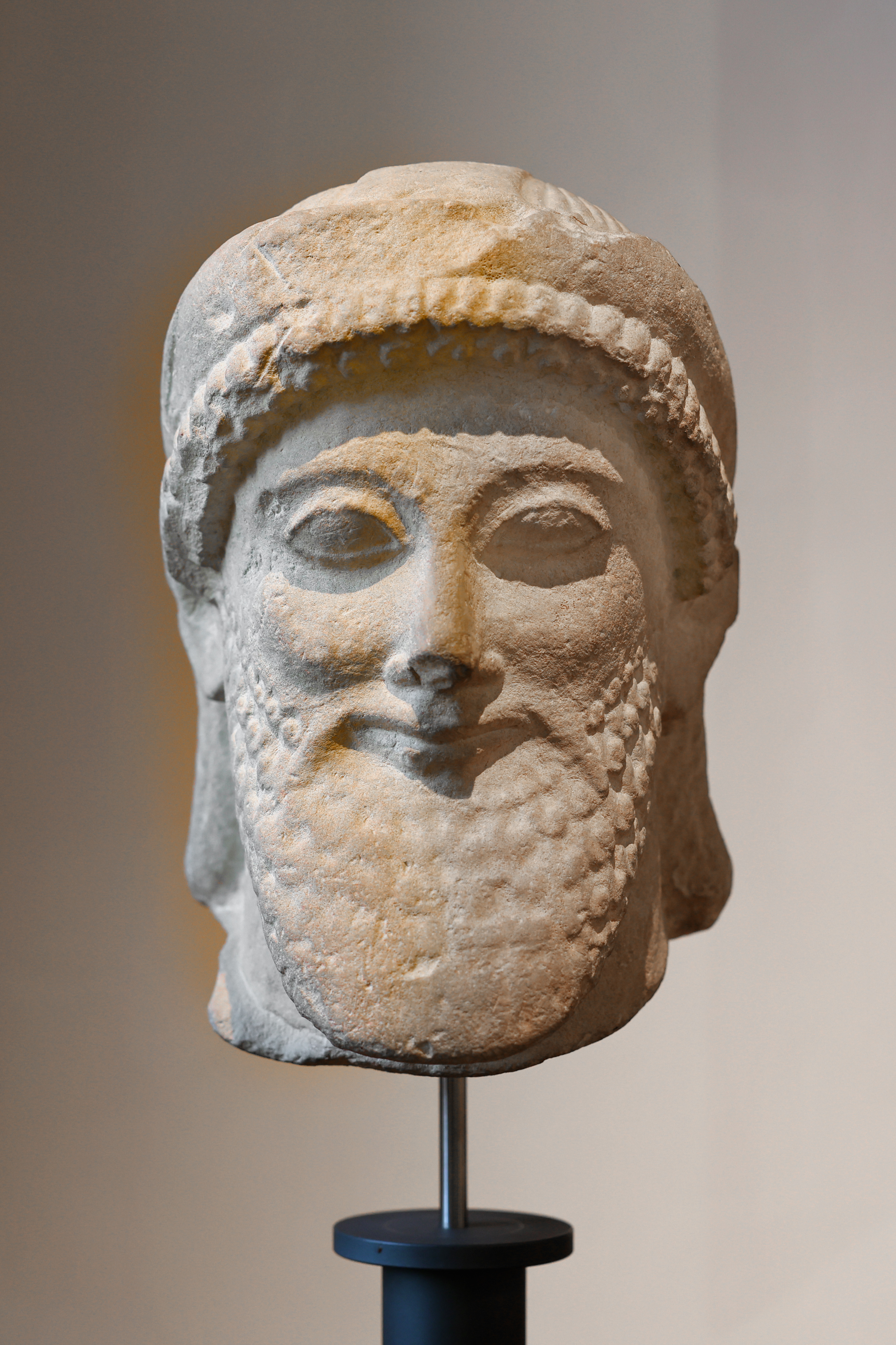

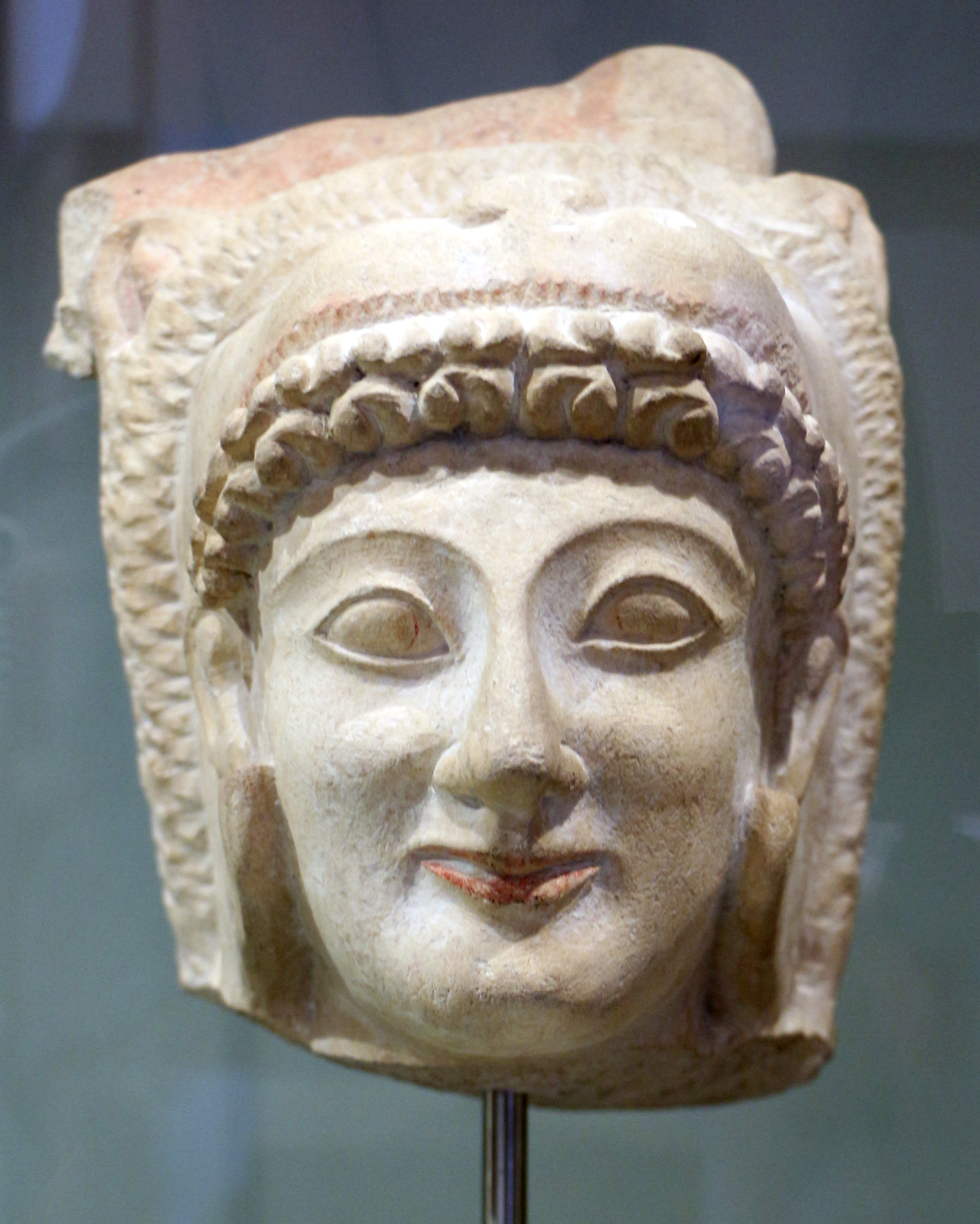

=== Etruscan ===
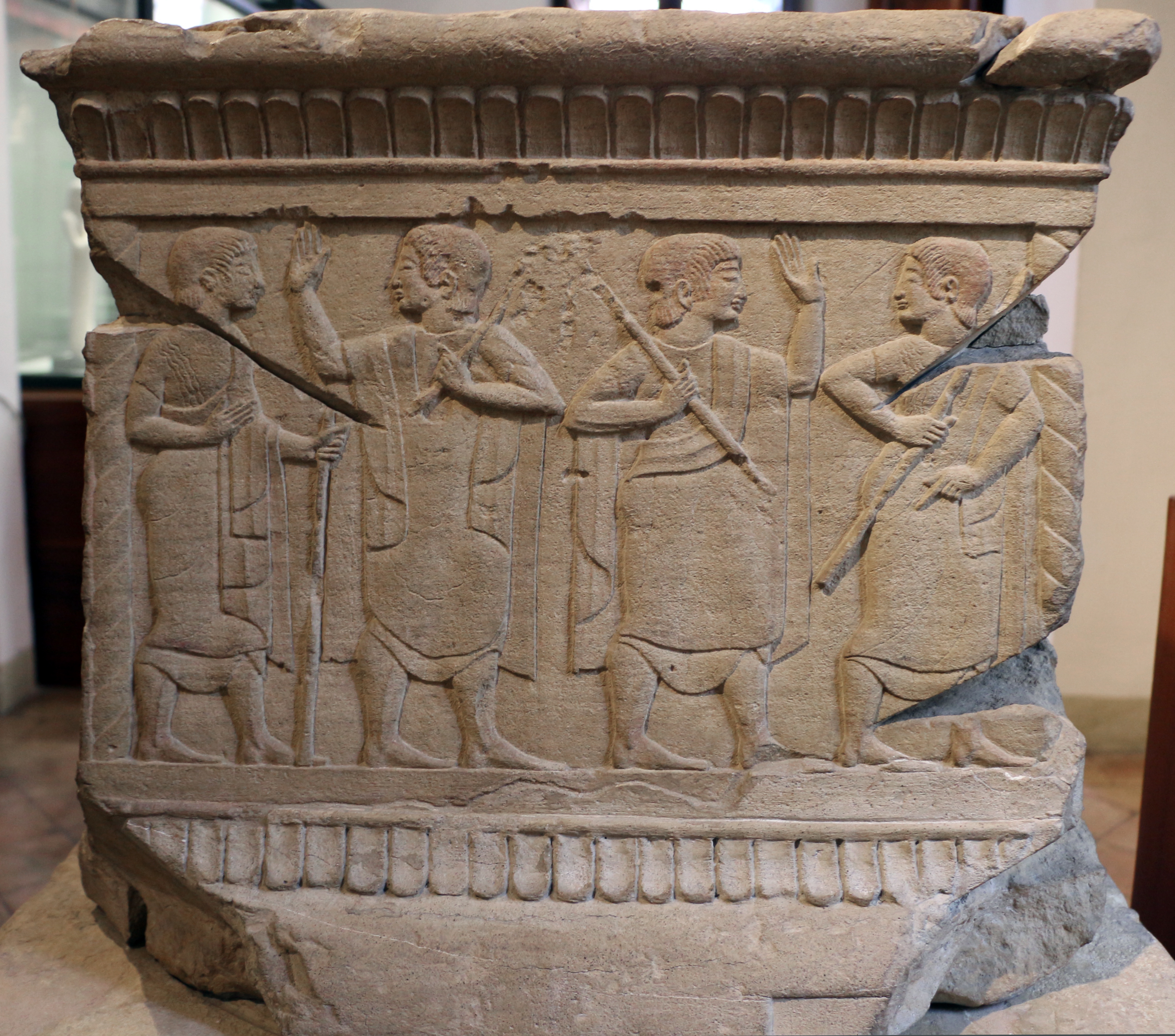

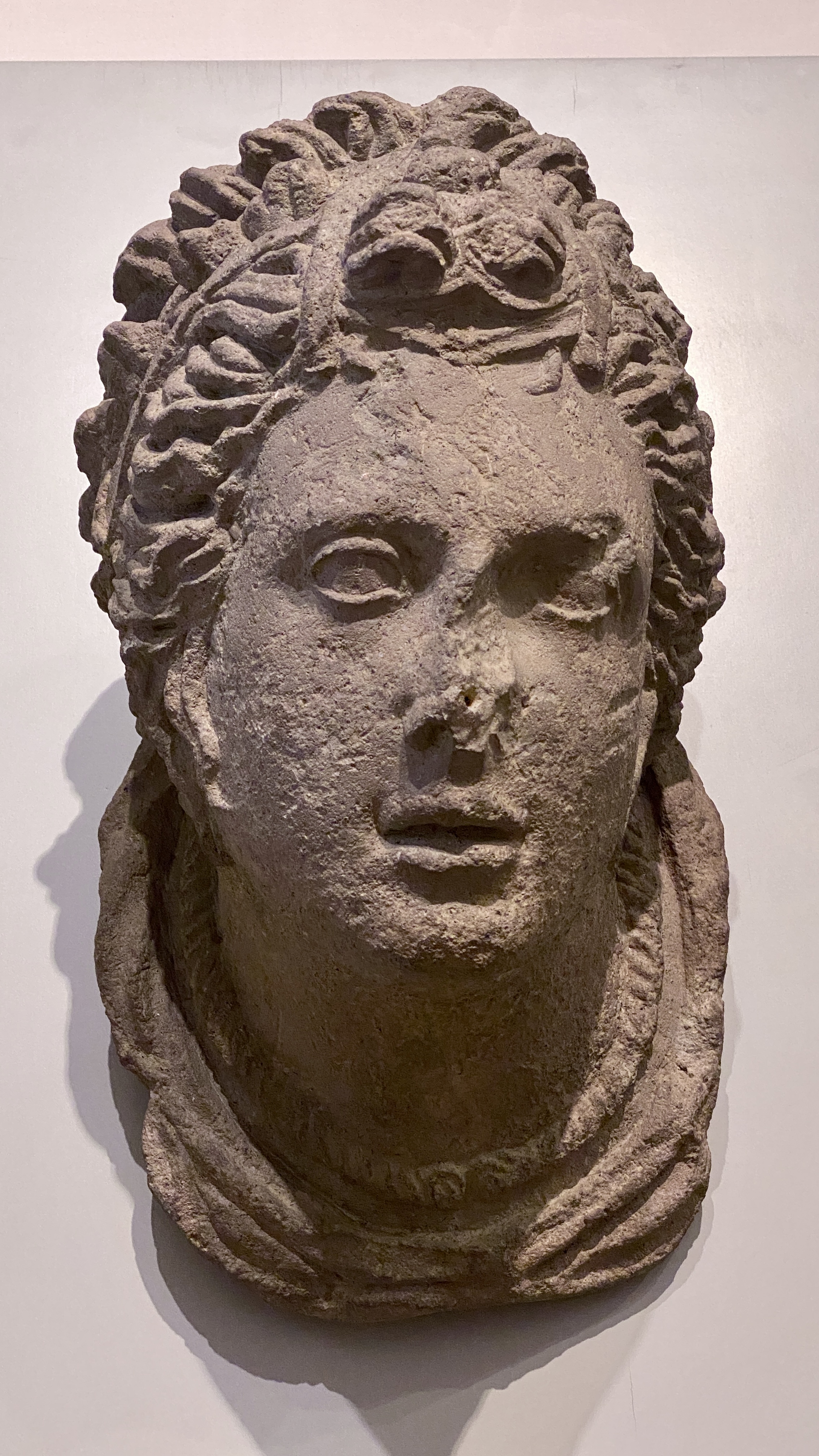

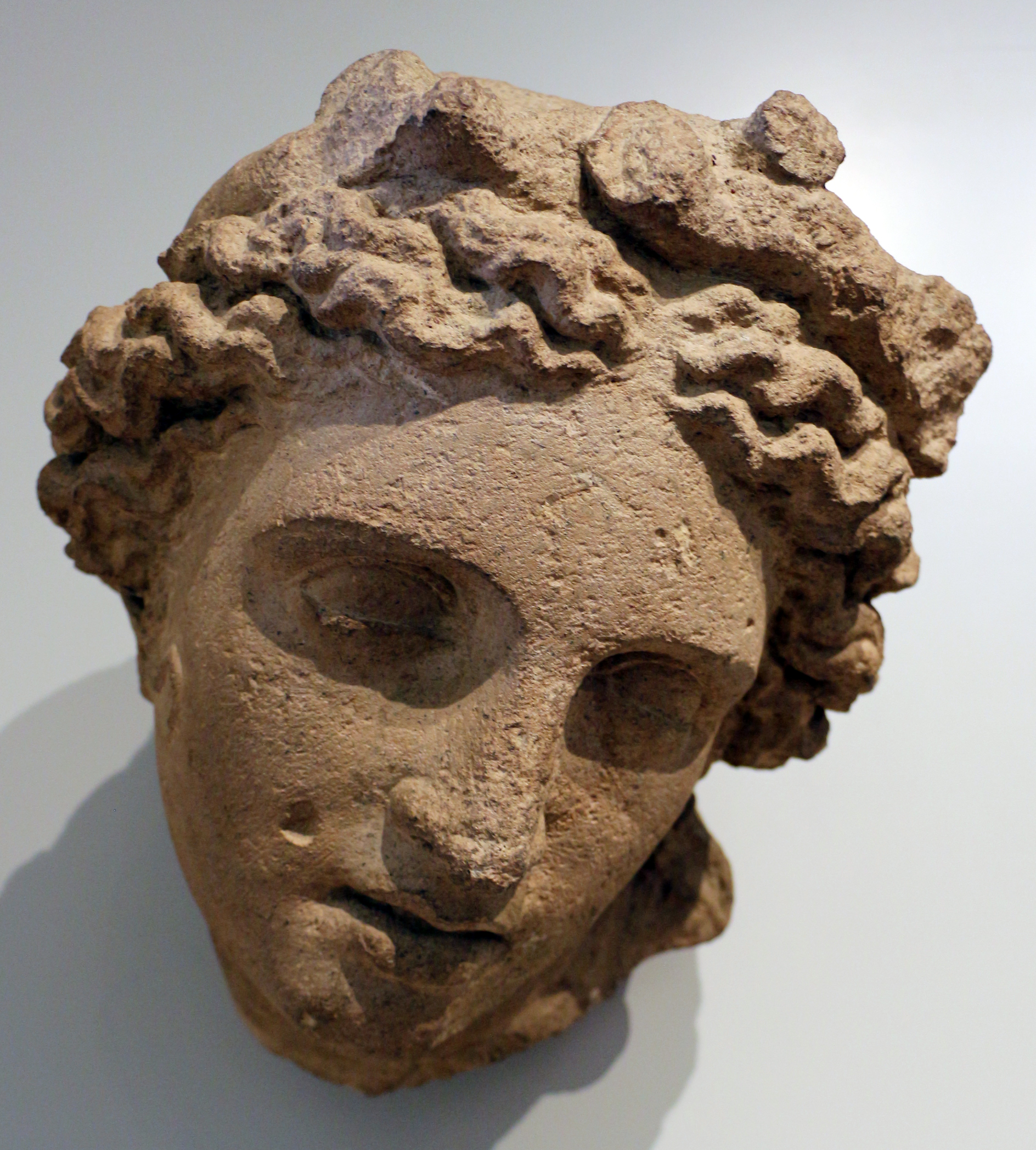

=== Greek ===
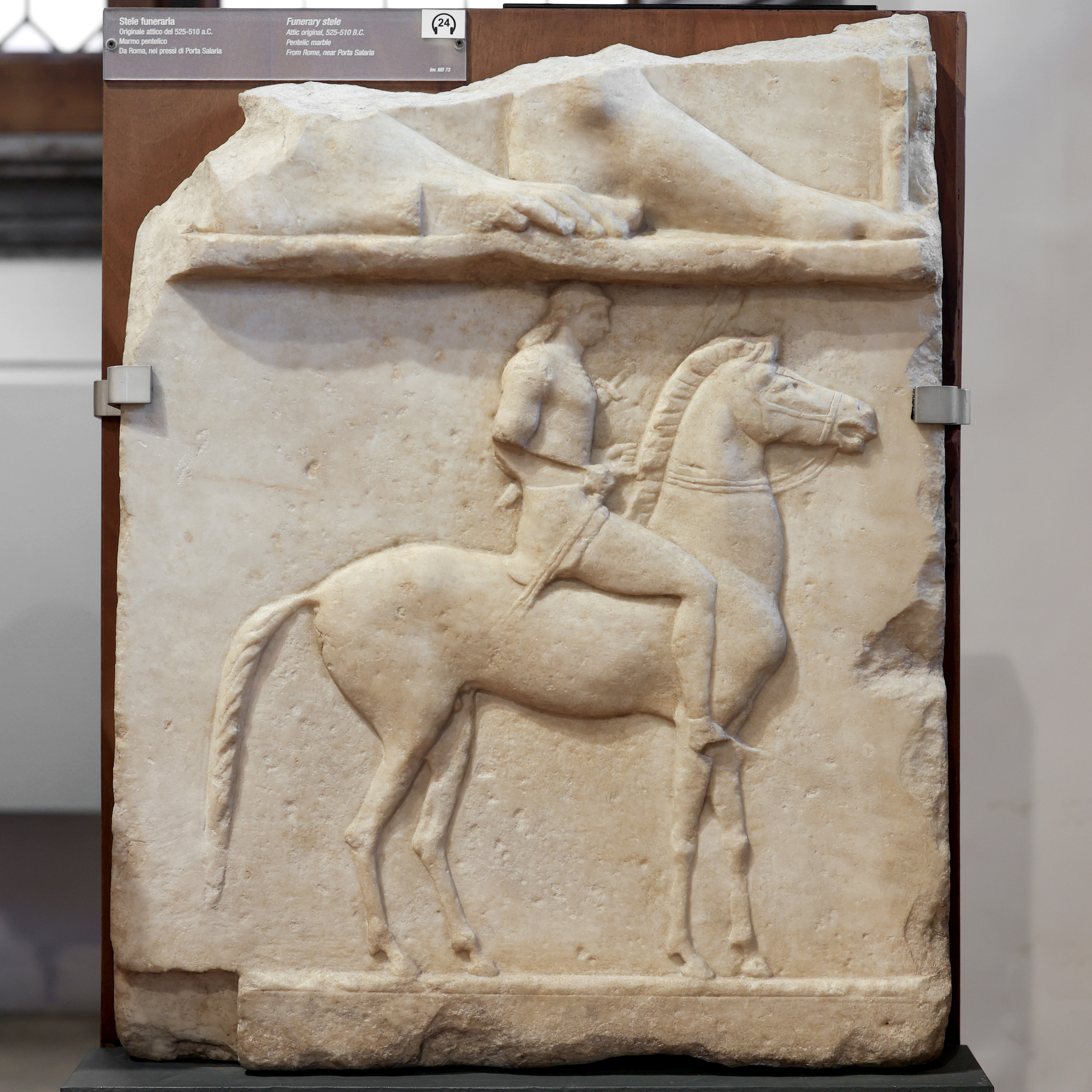

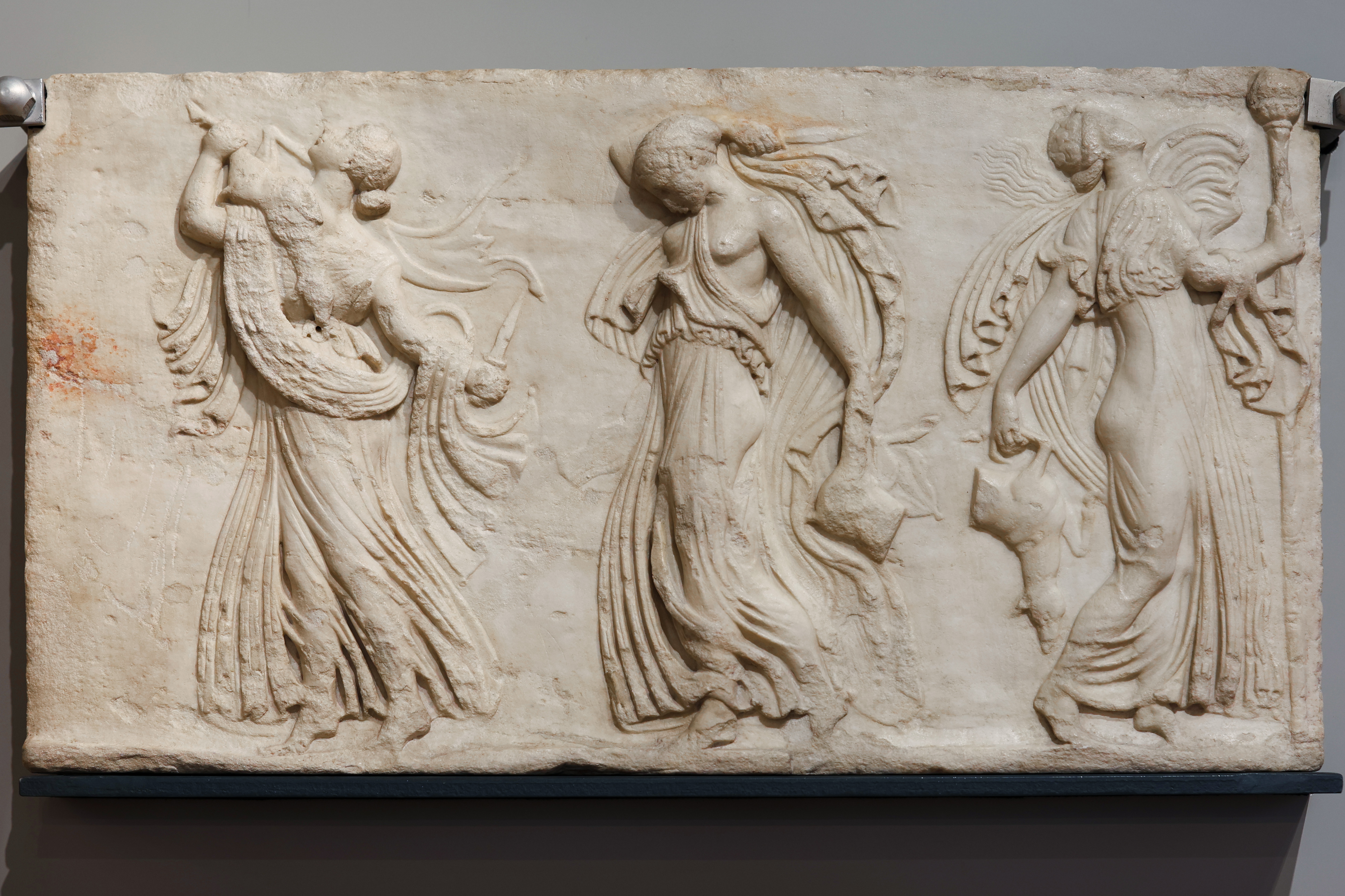

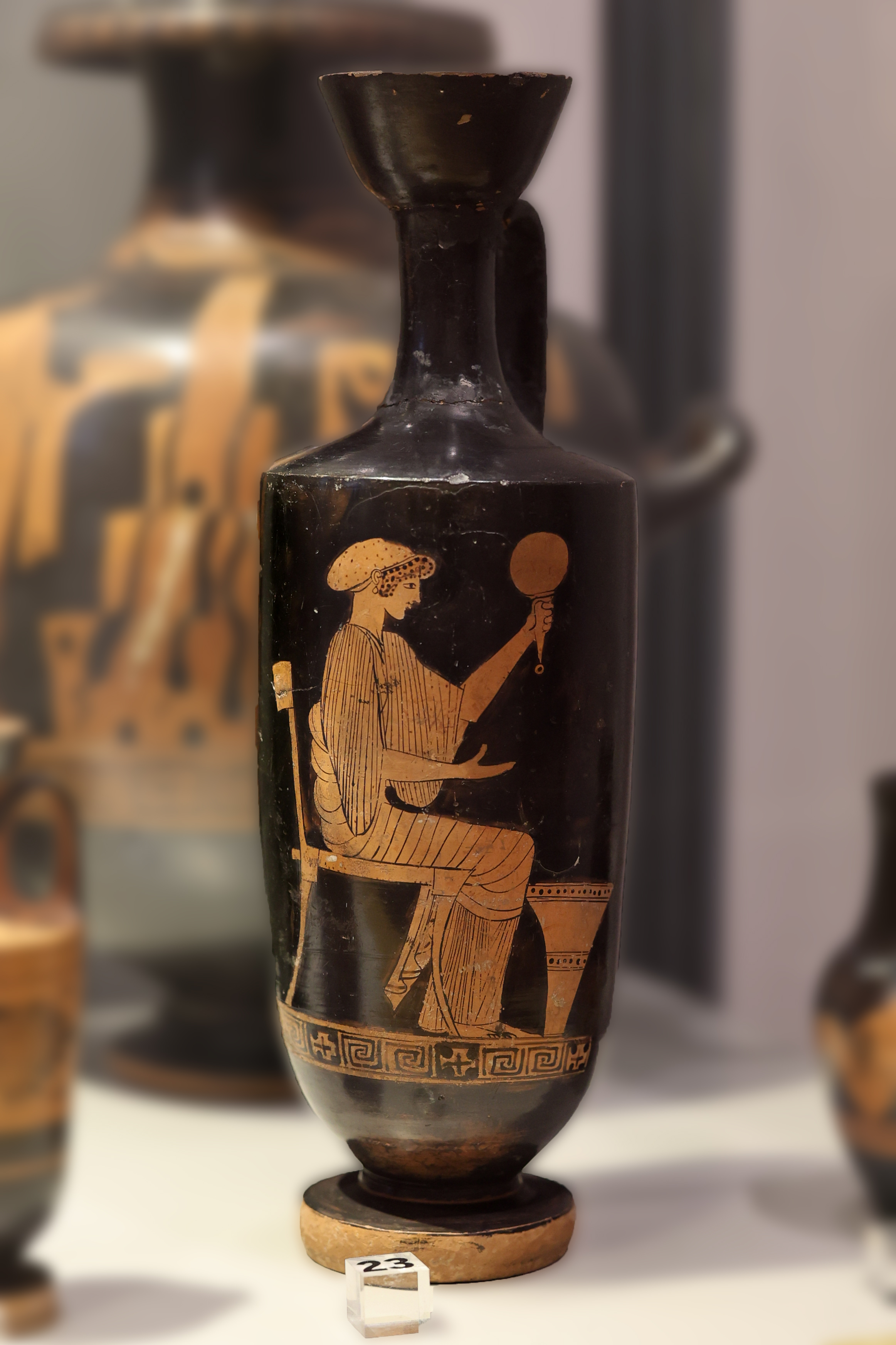

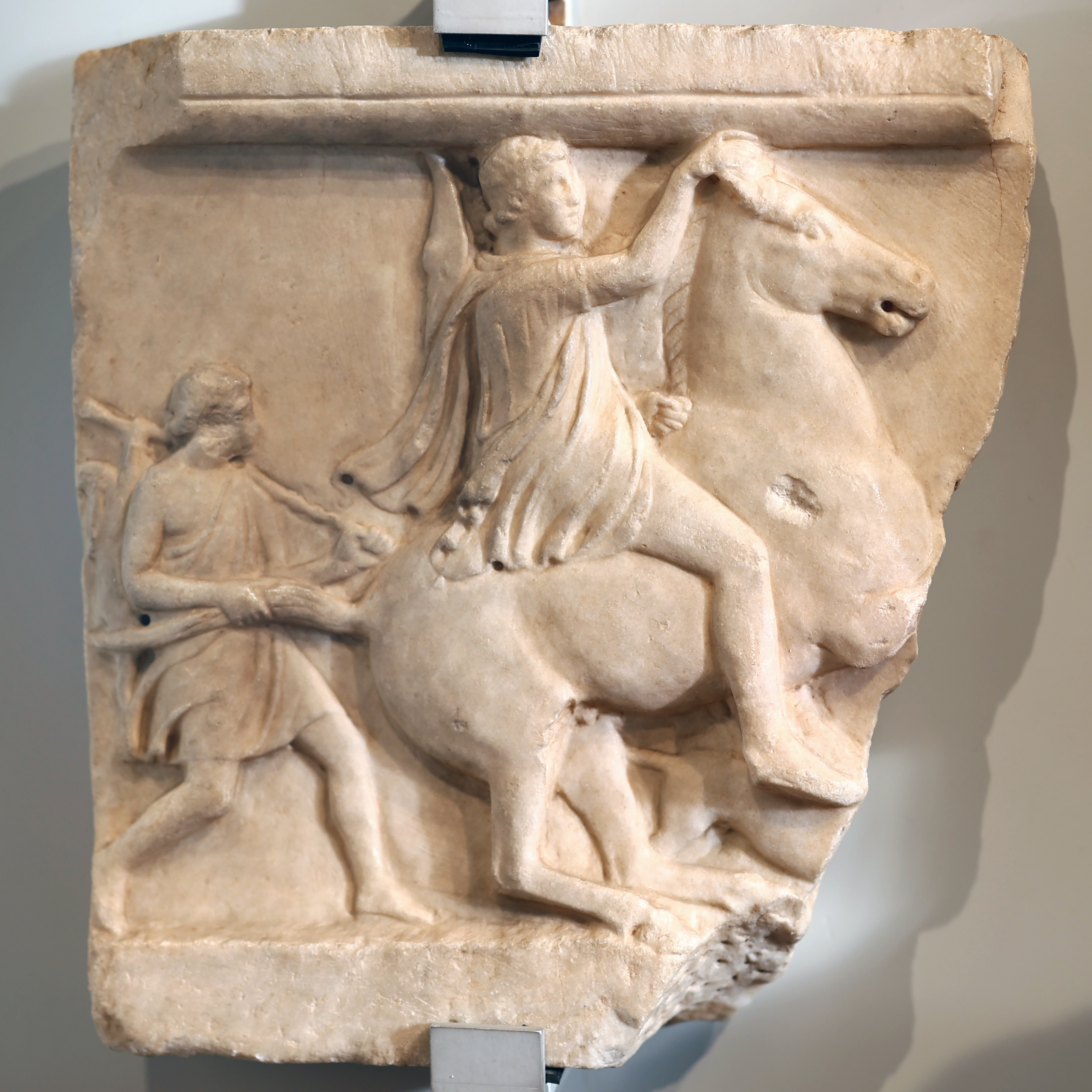

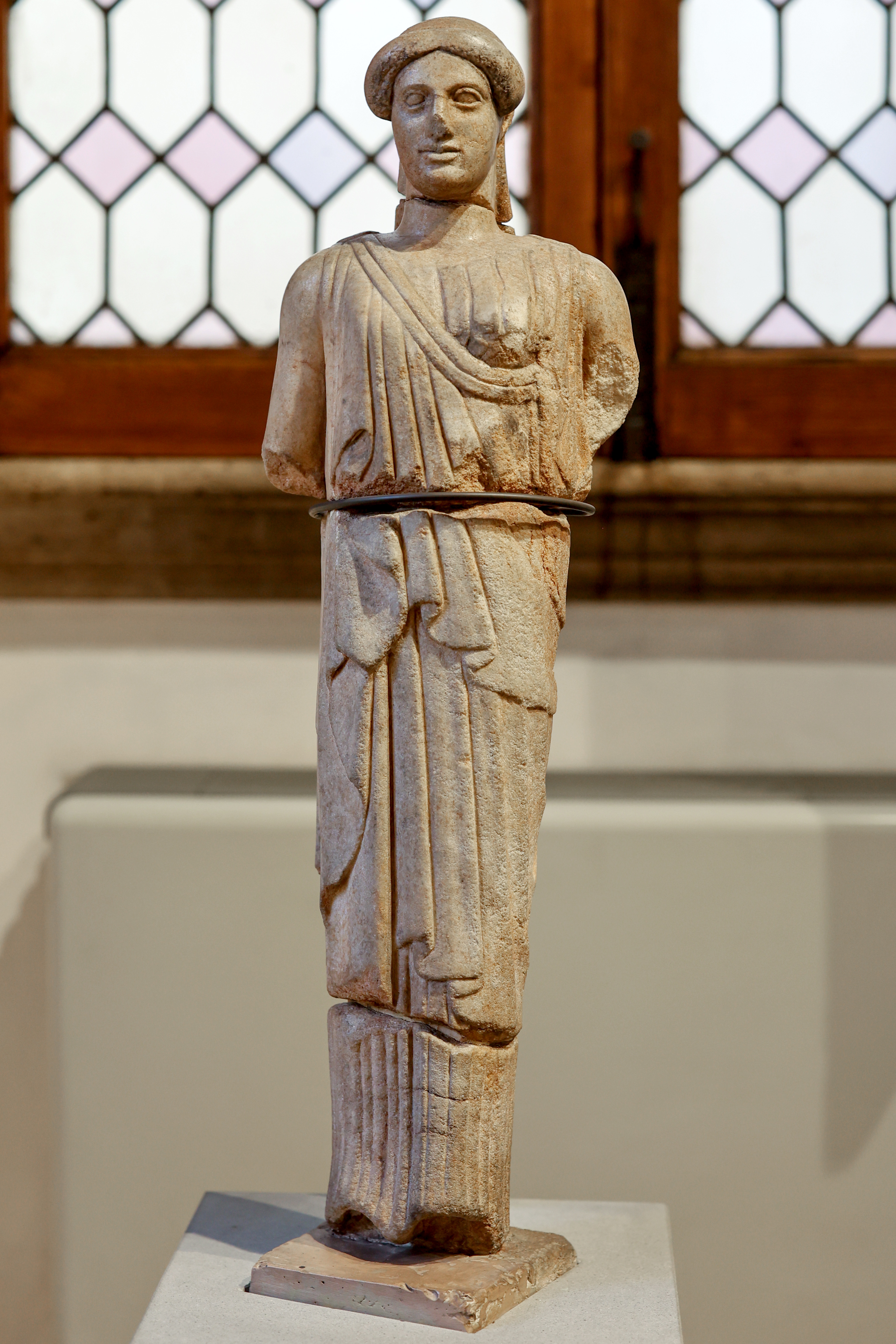

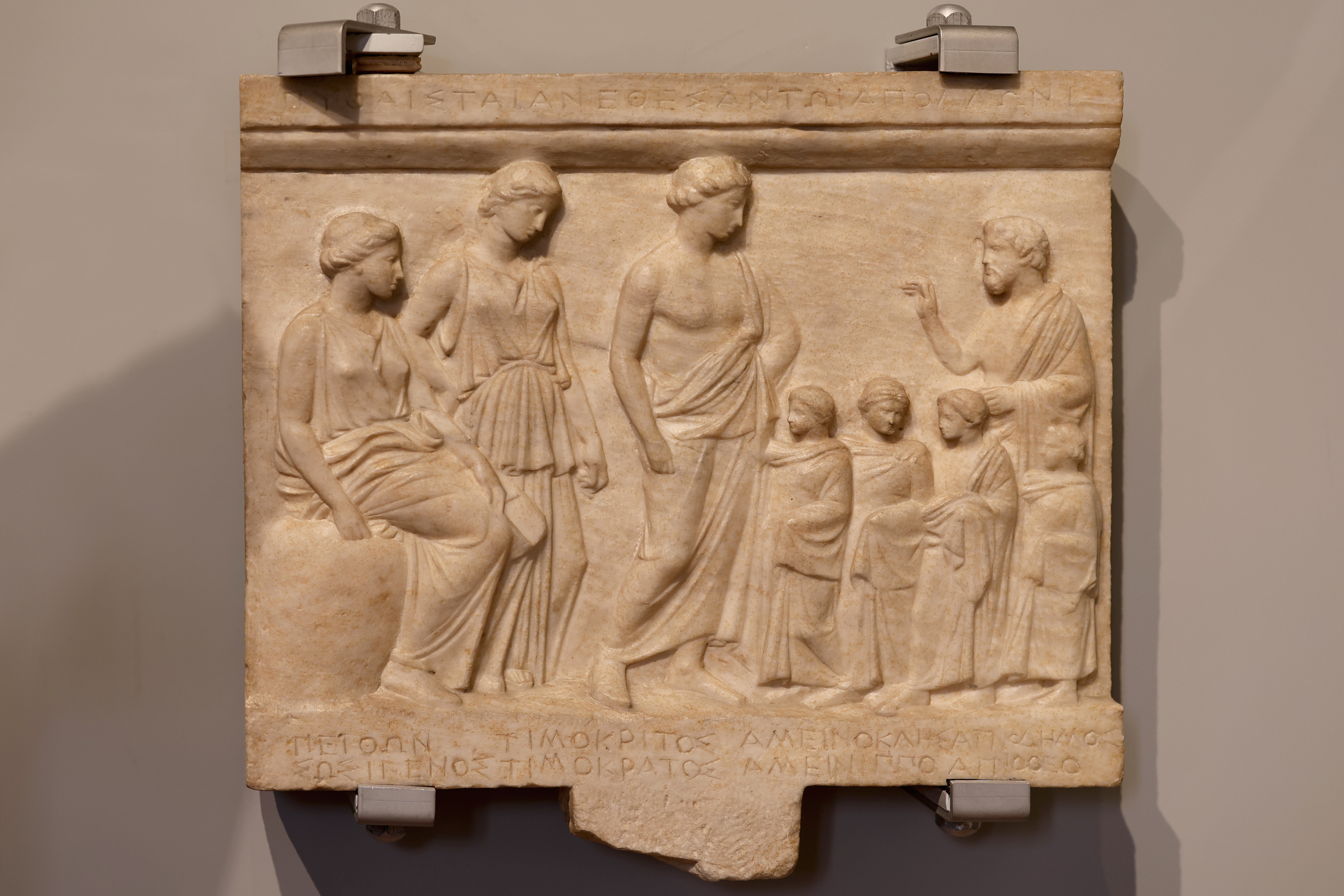

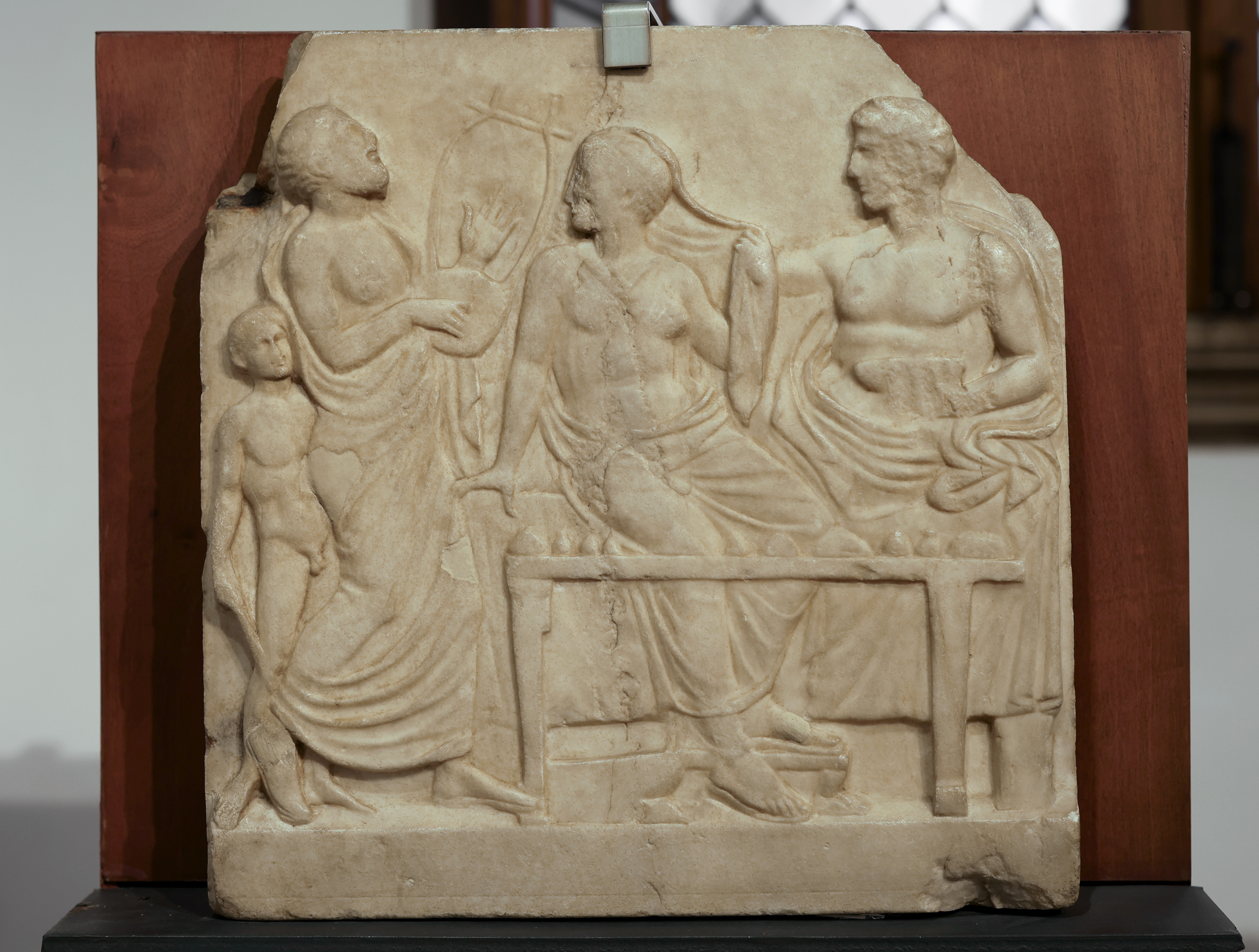

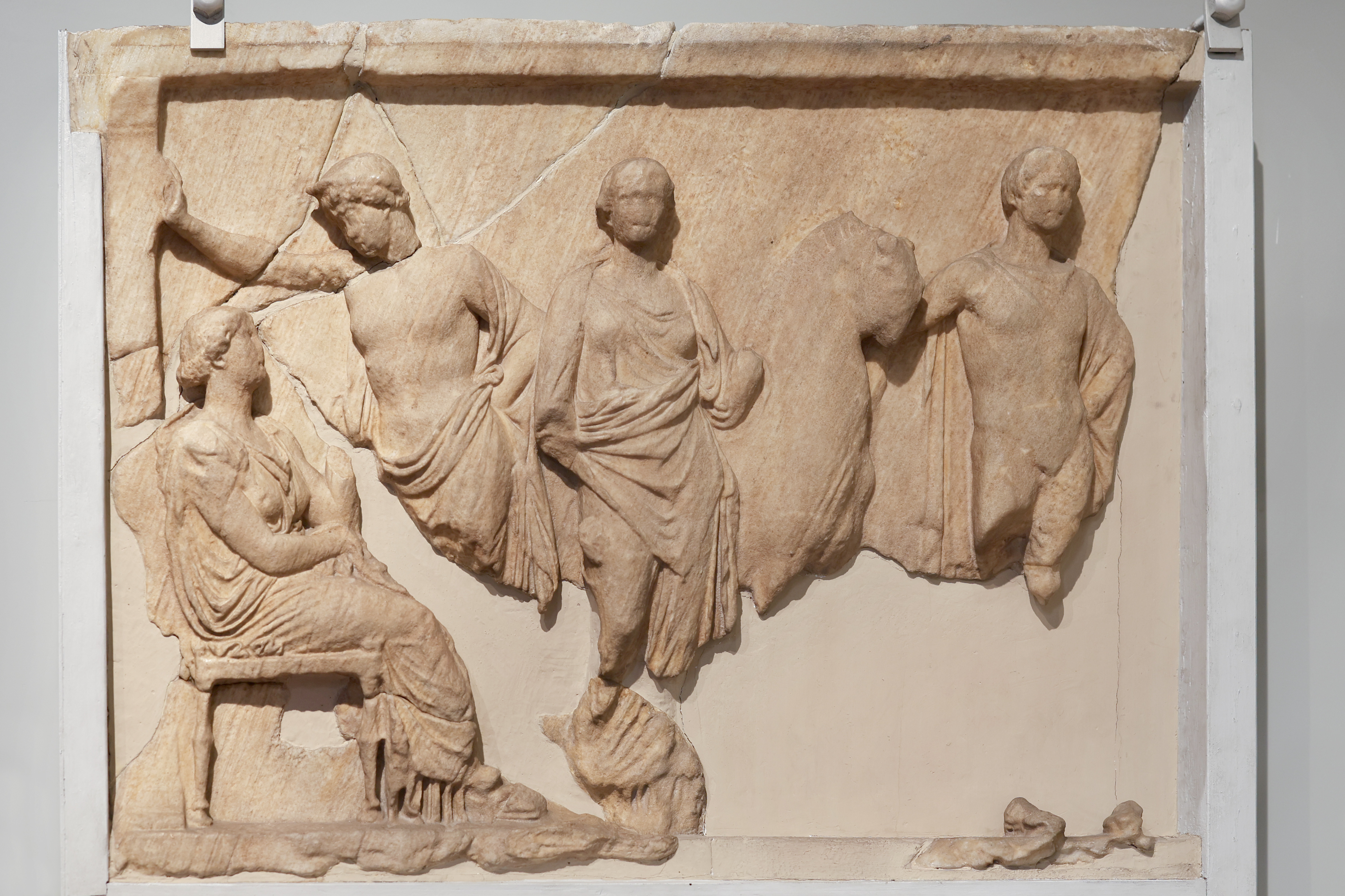

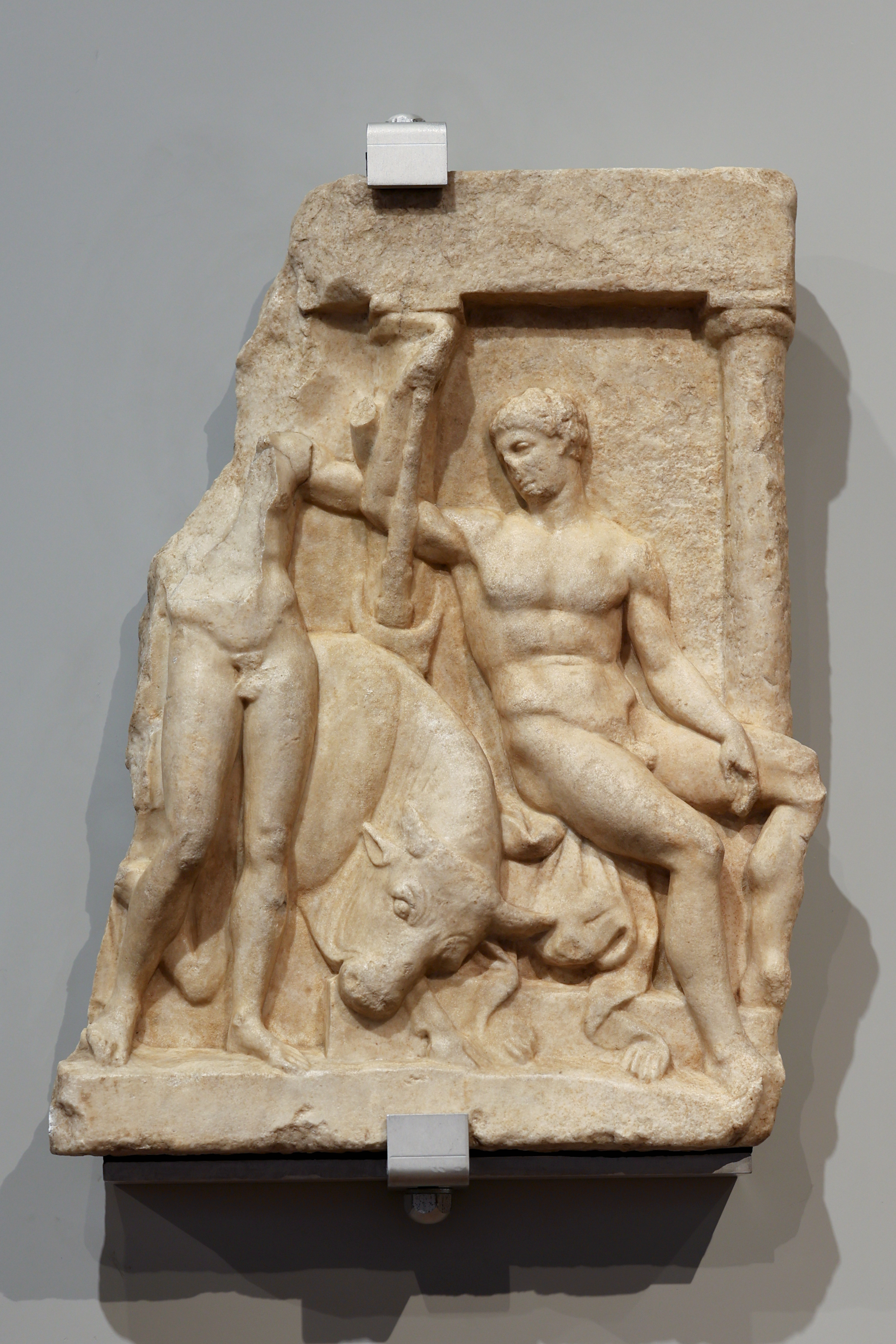

=== Near Eastern ===
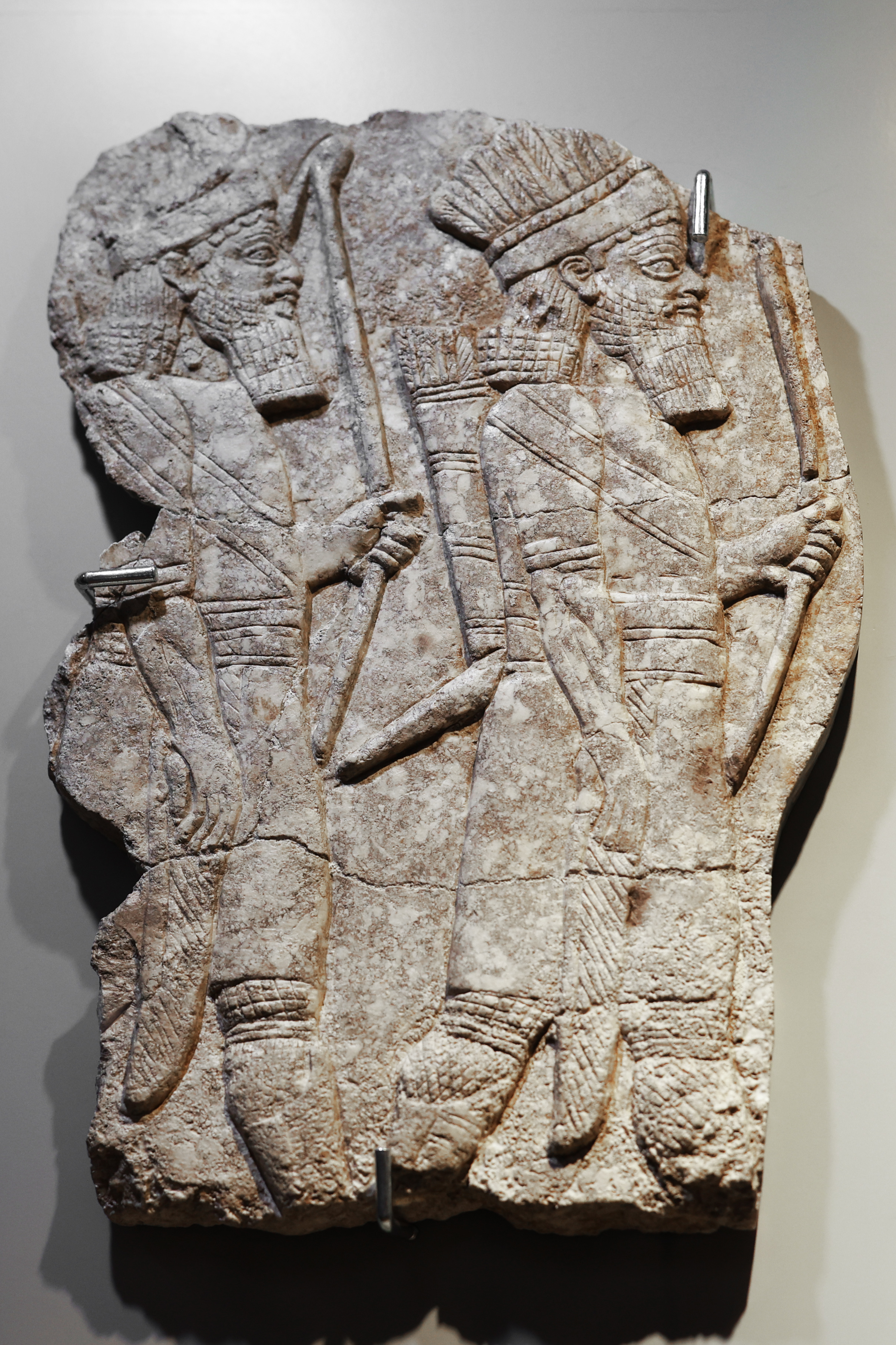

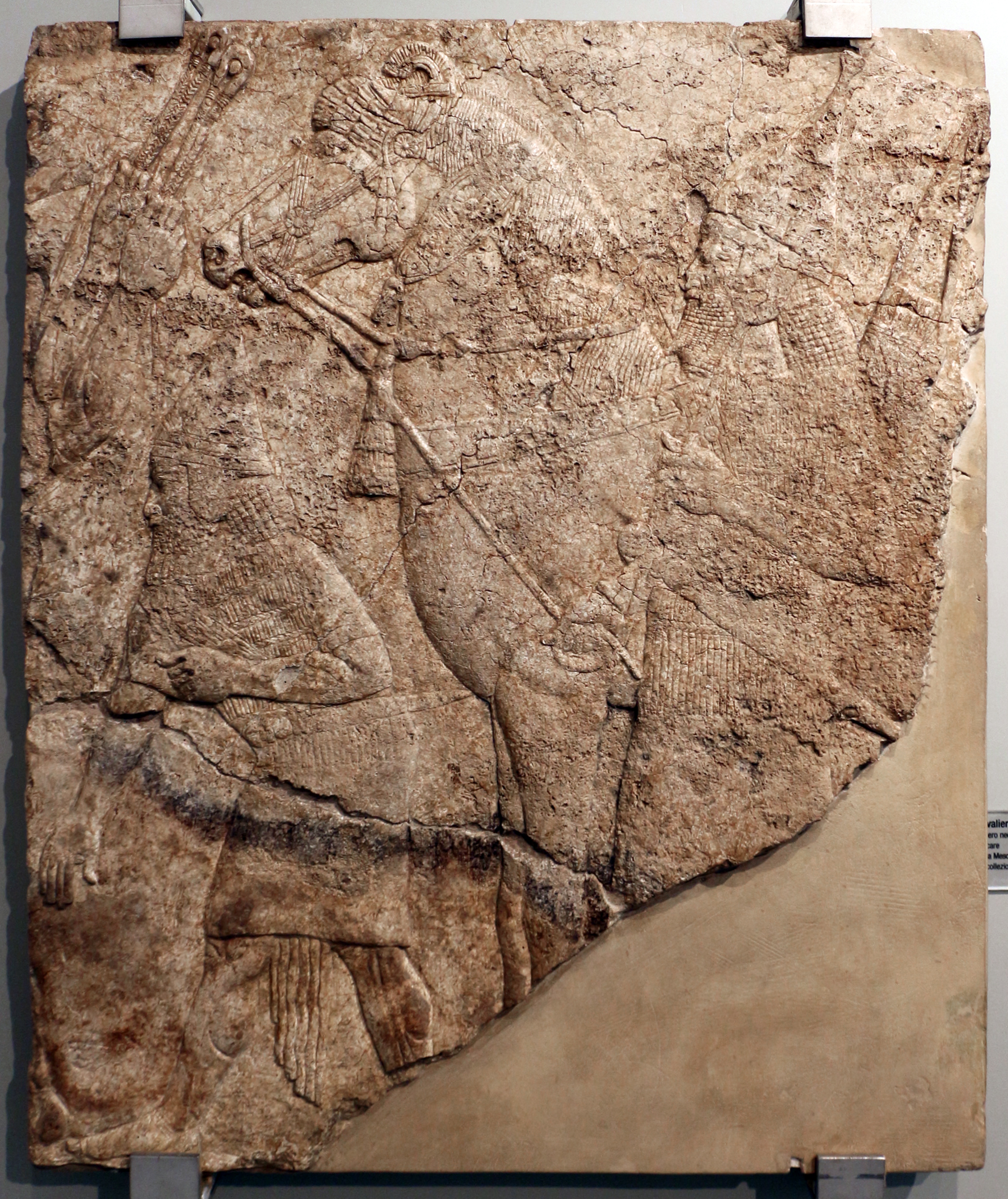

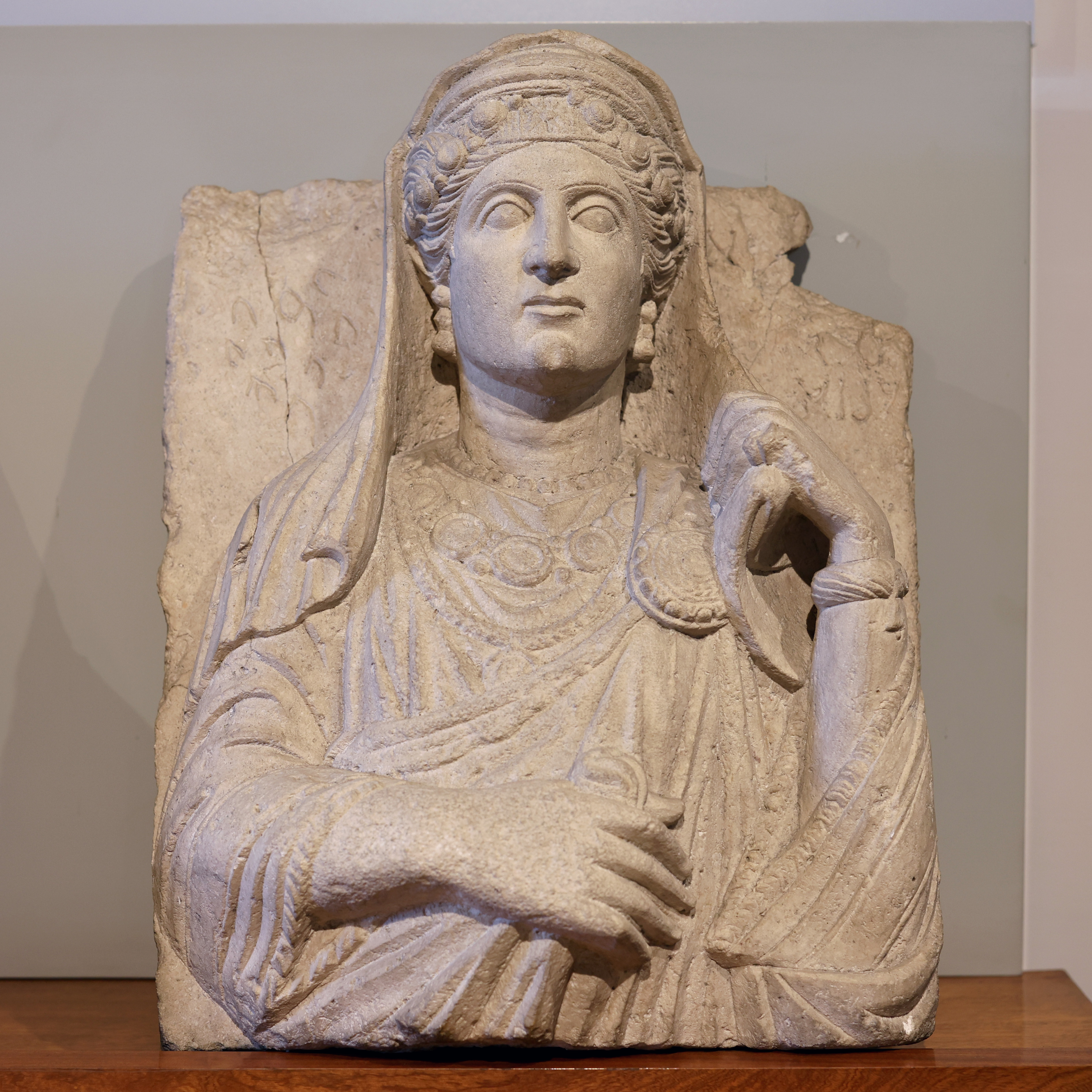

=== Roman ===
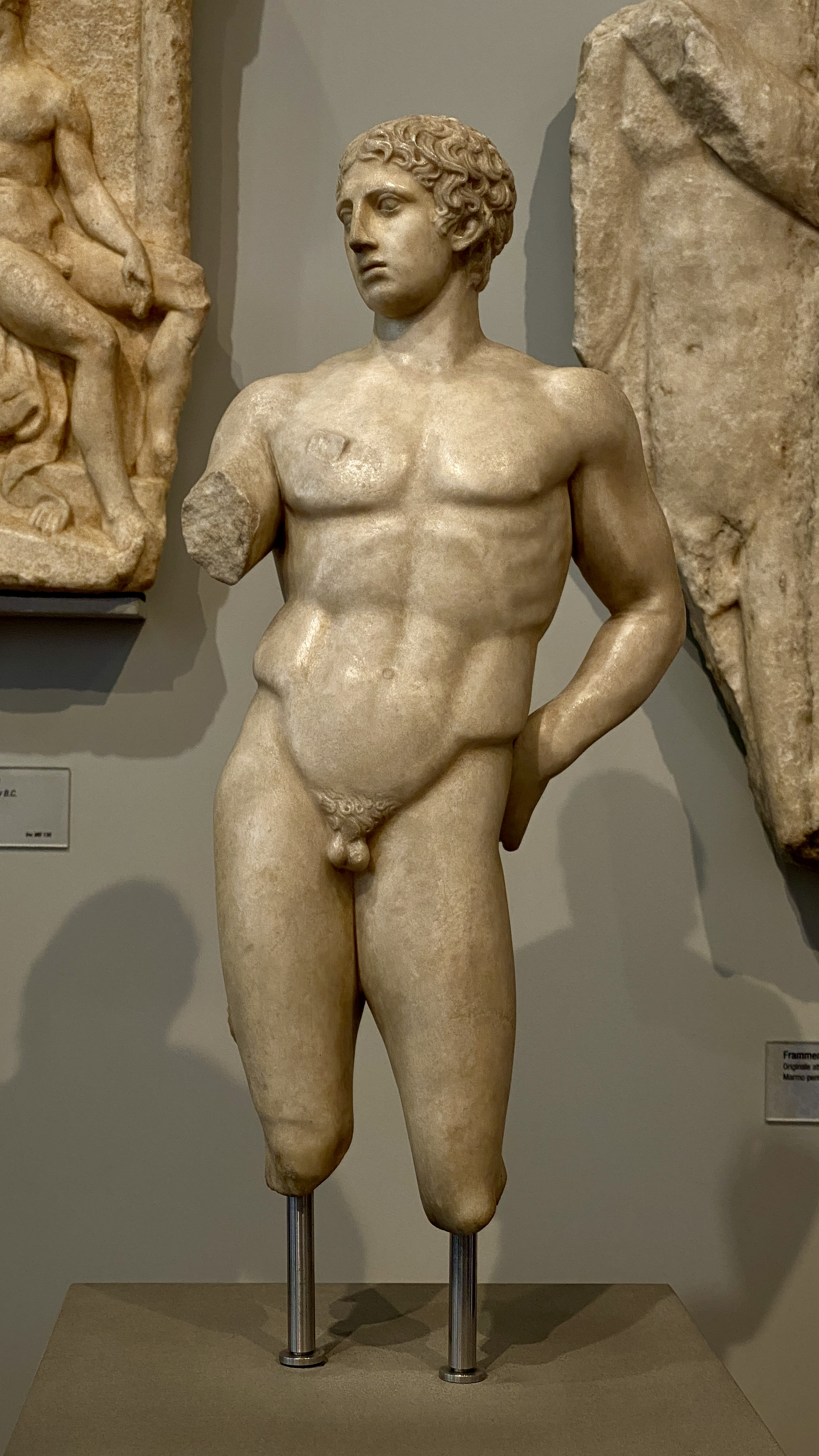

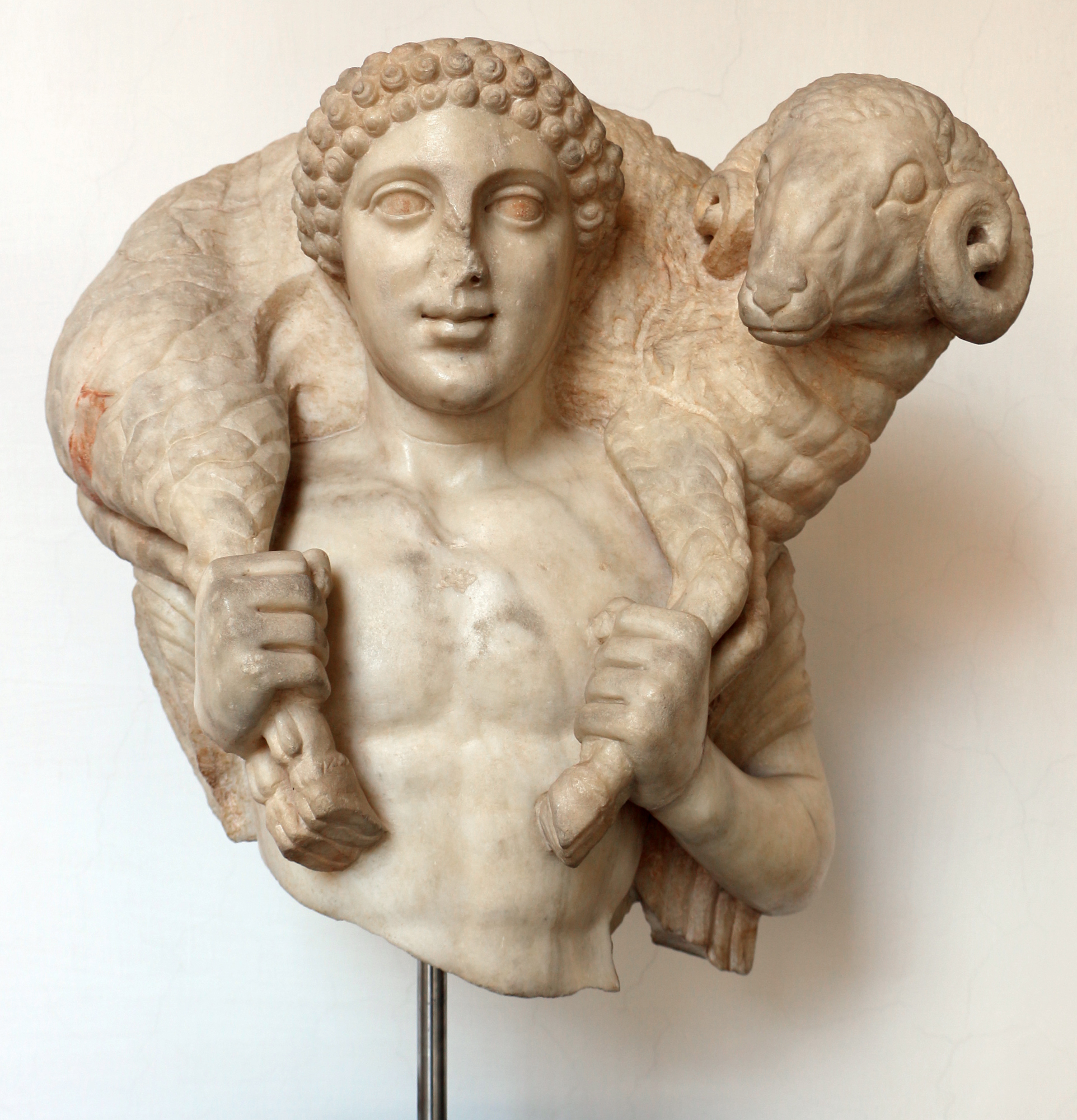

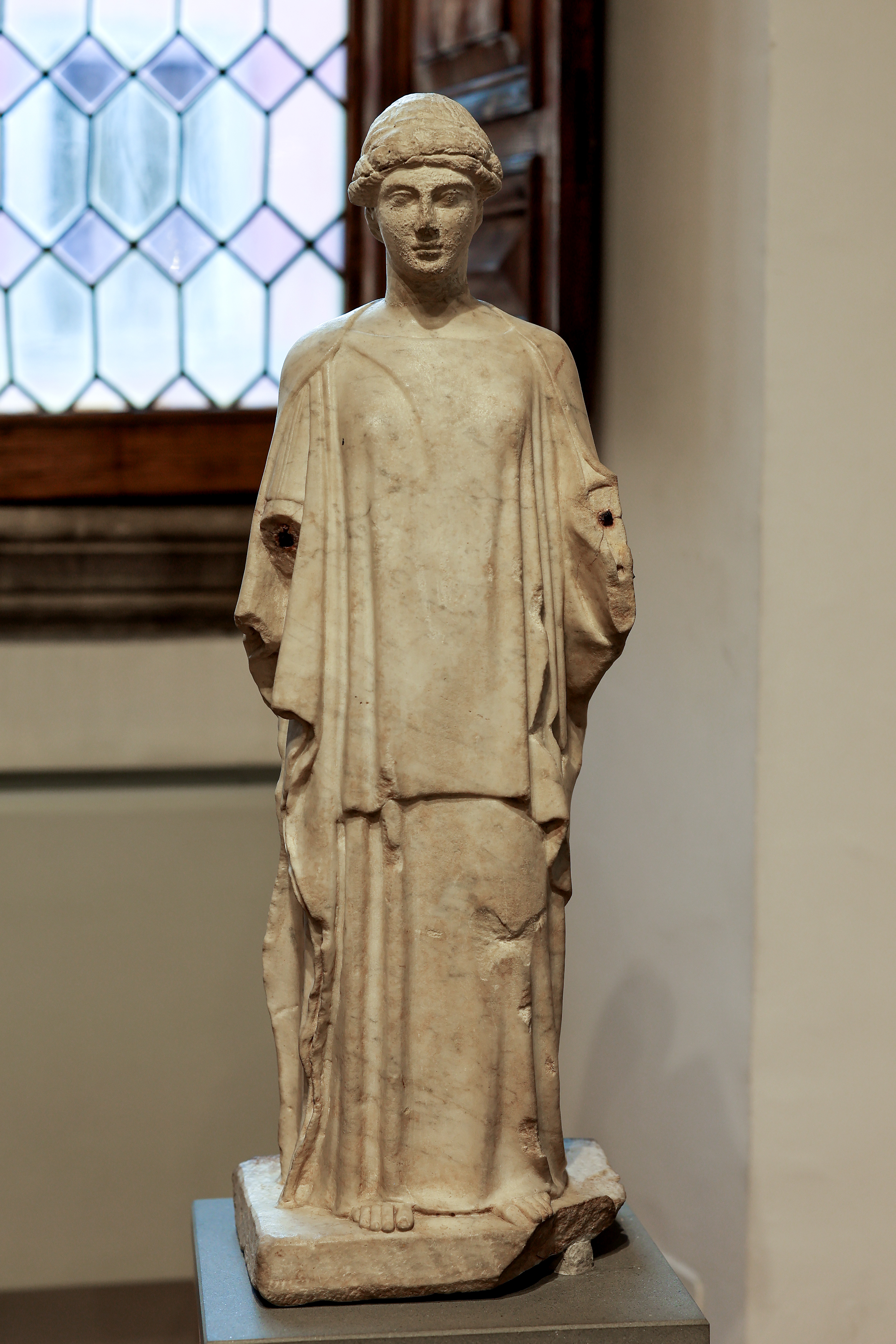

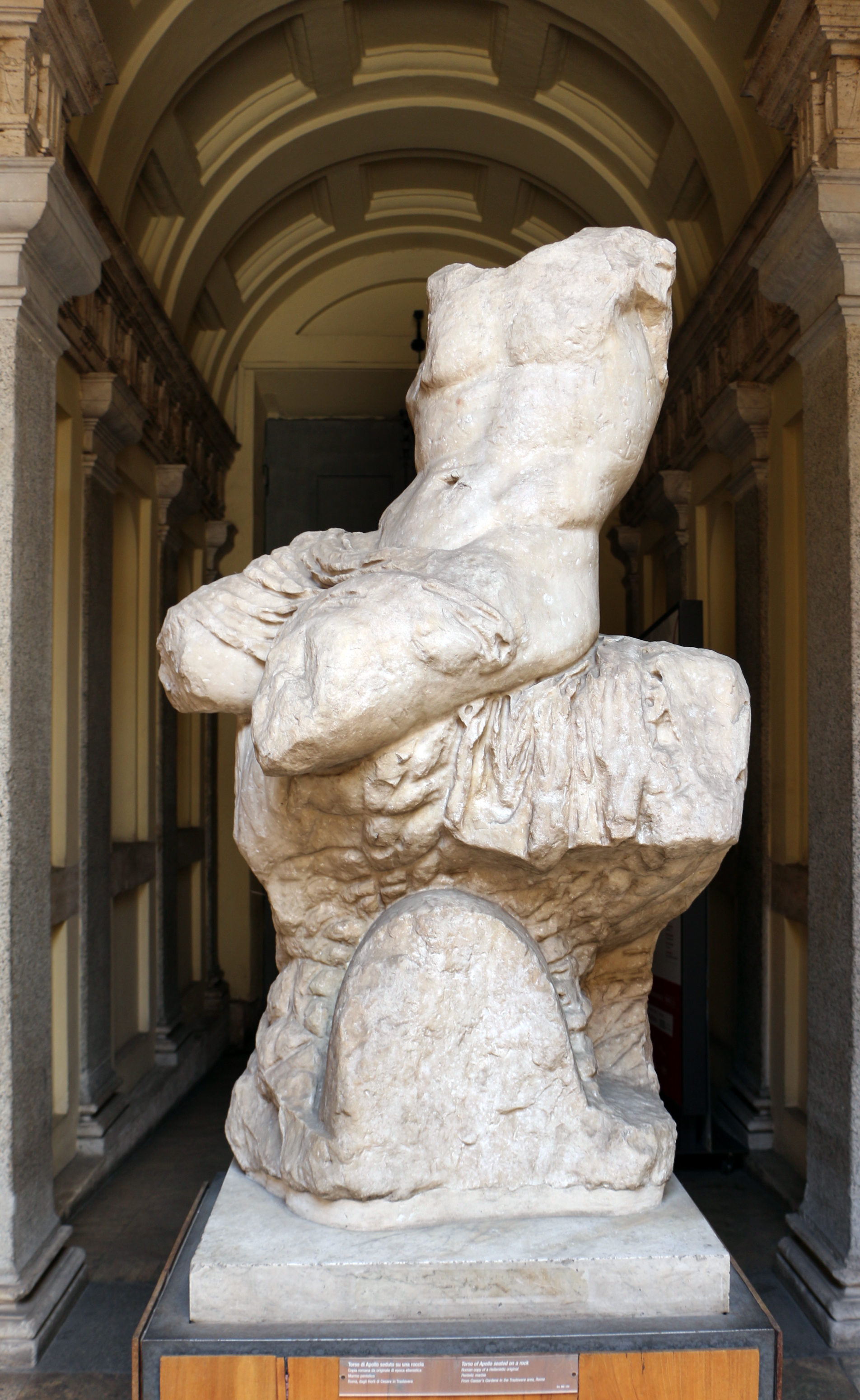

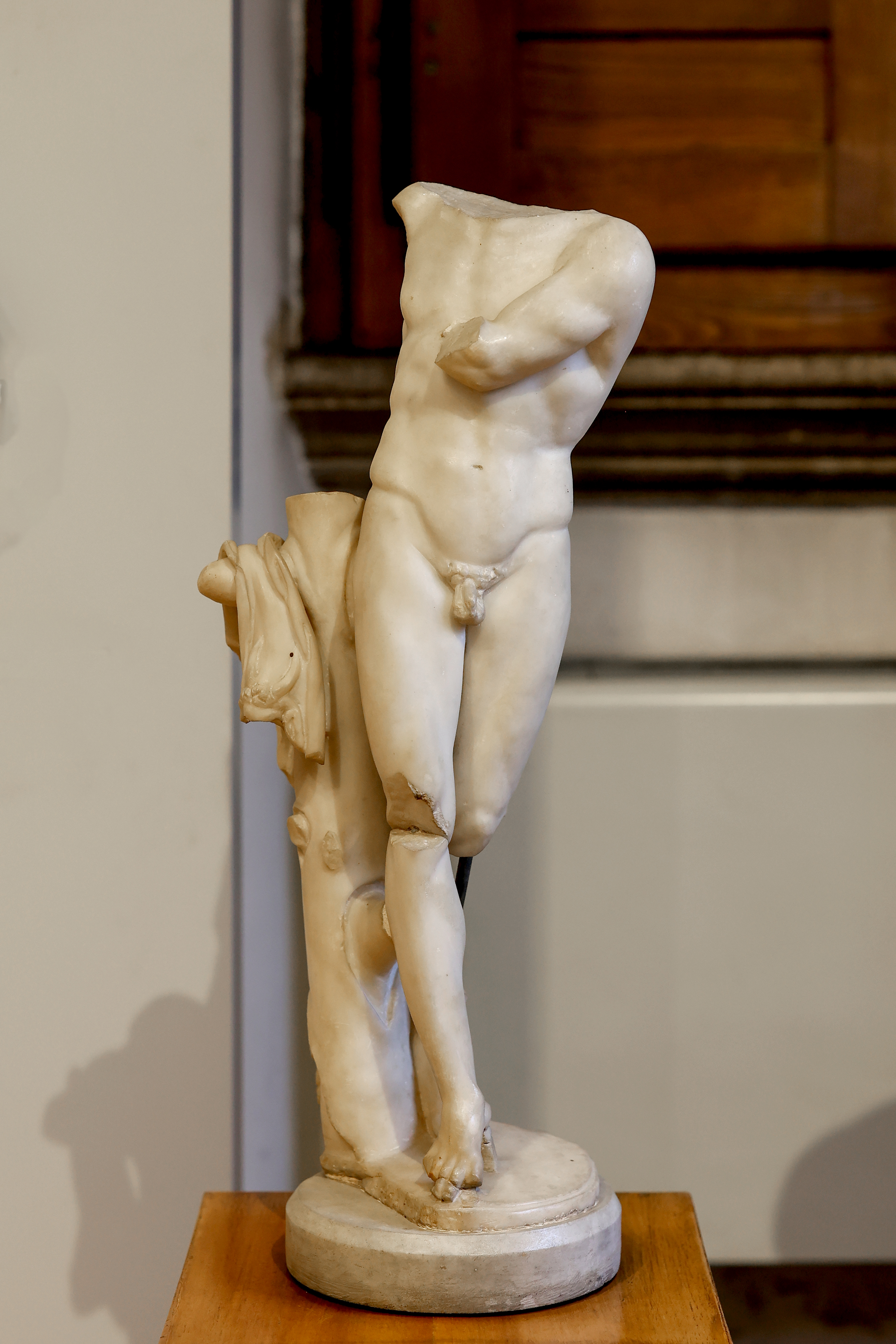

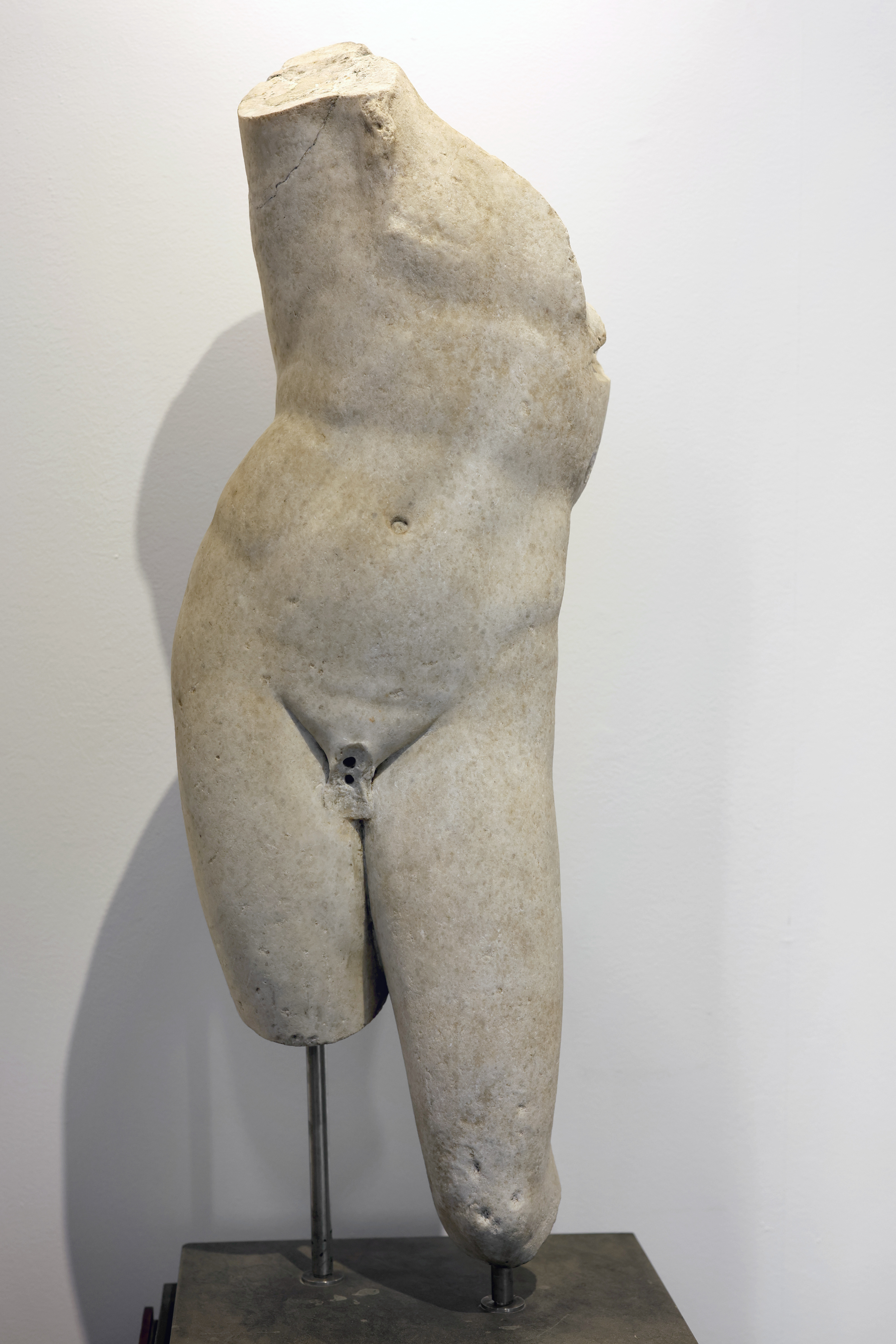

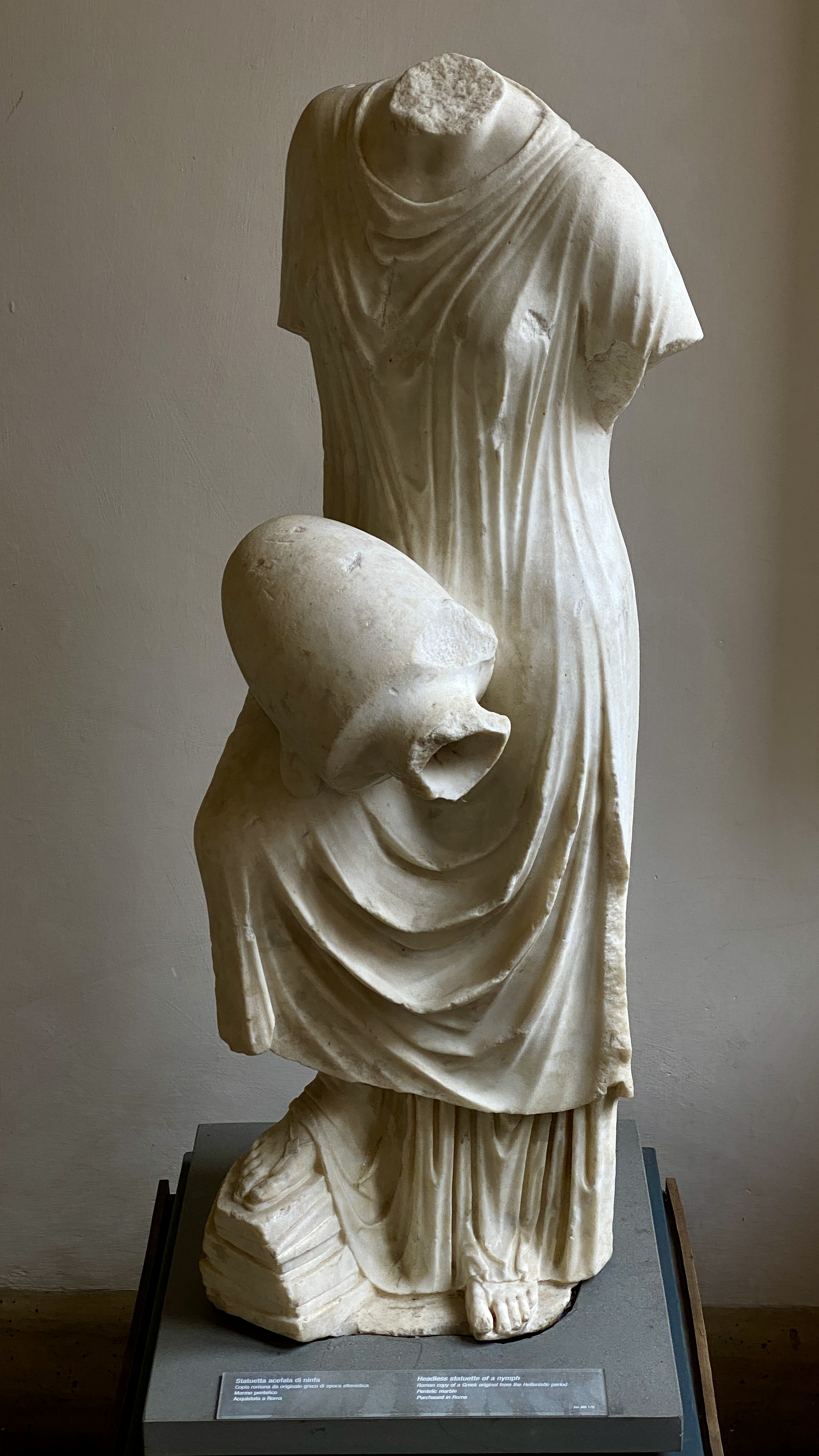

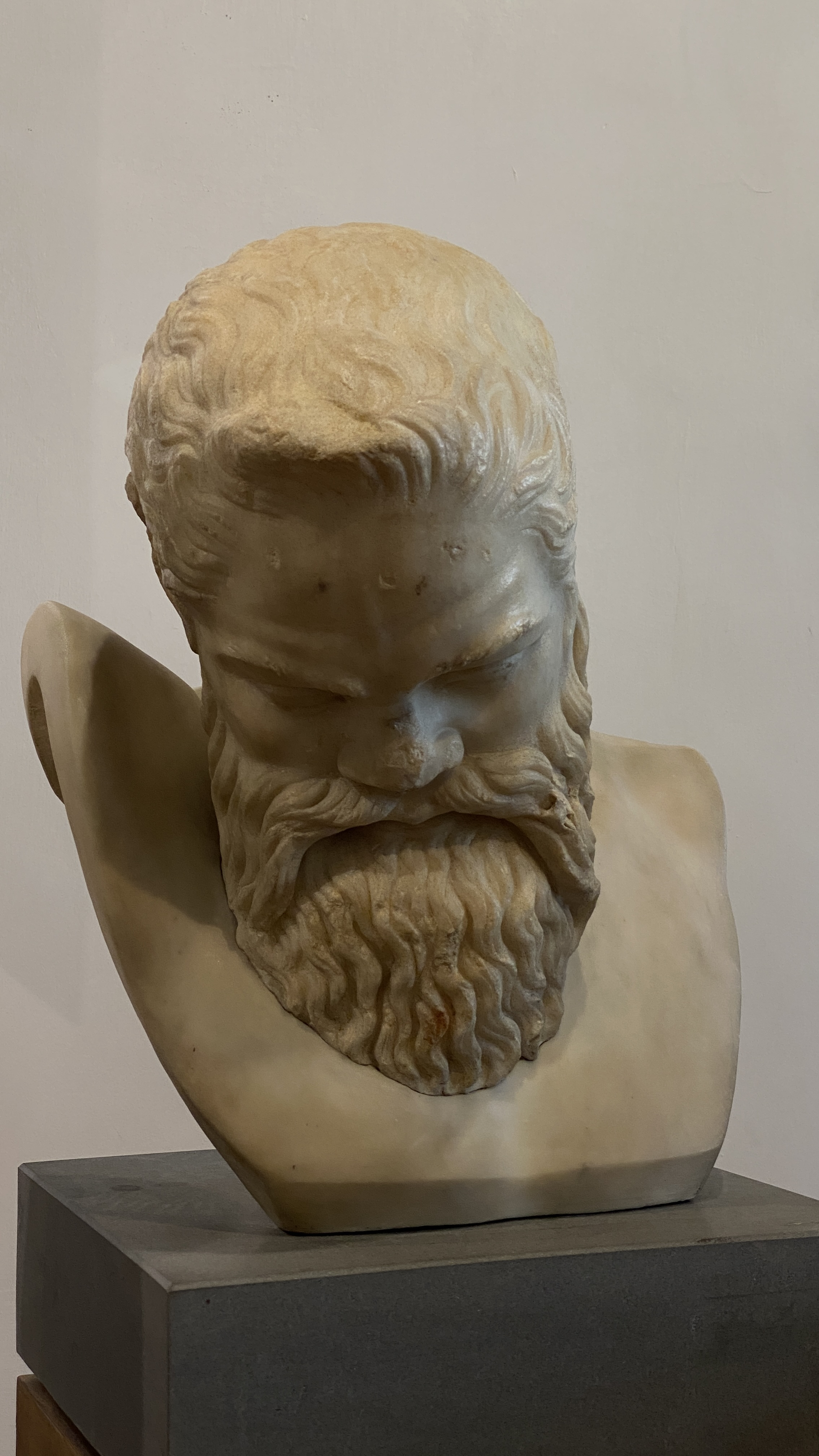

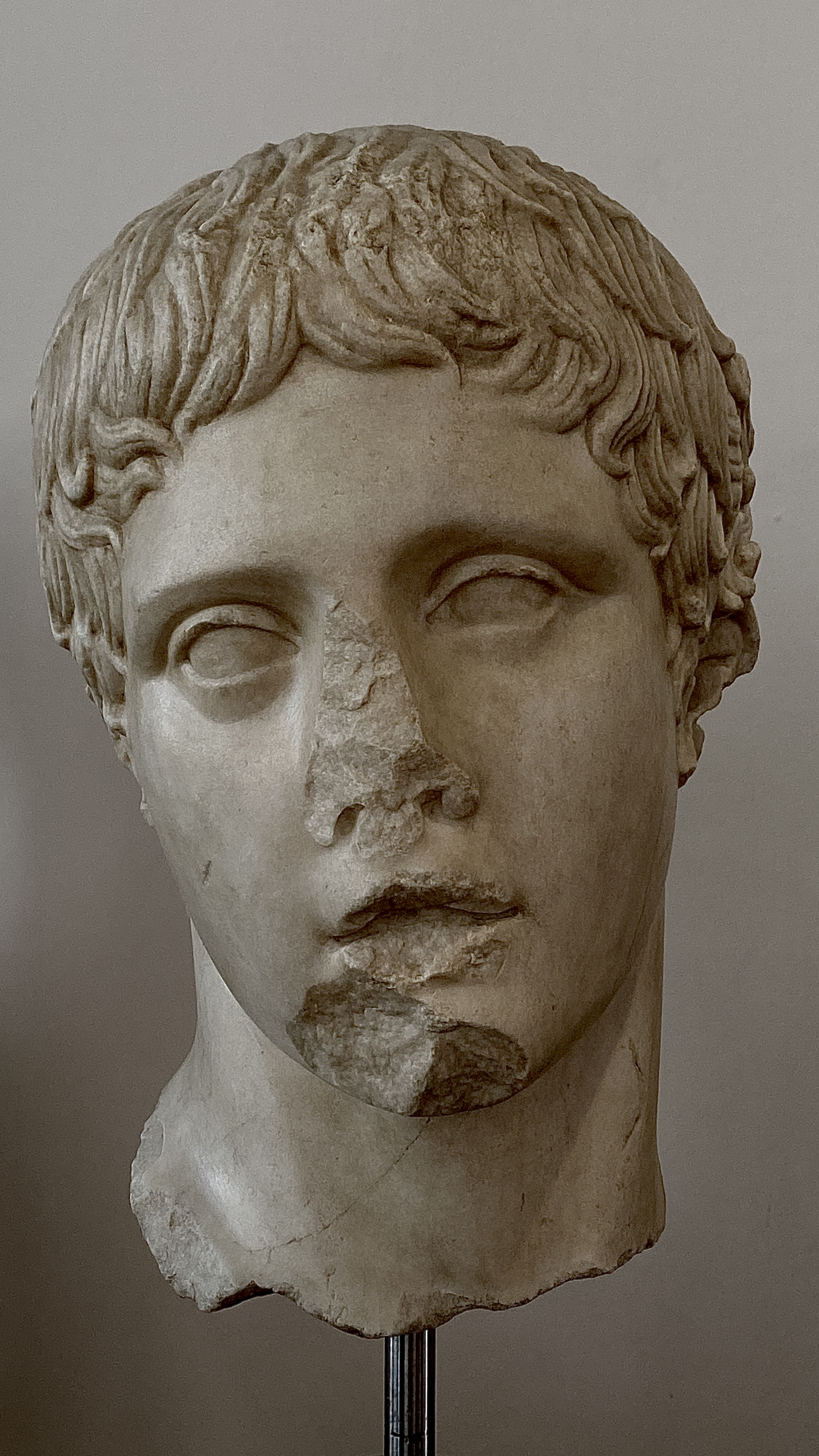

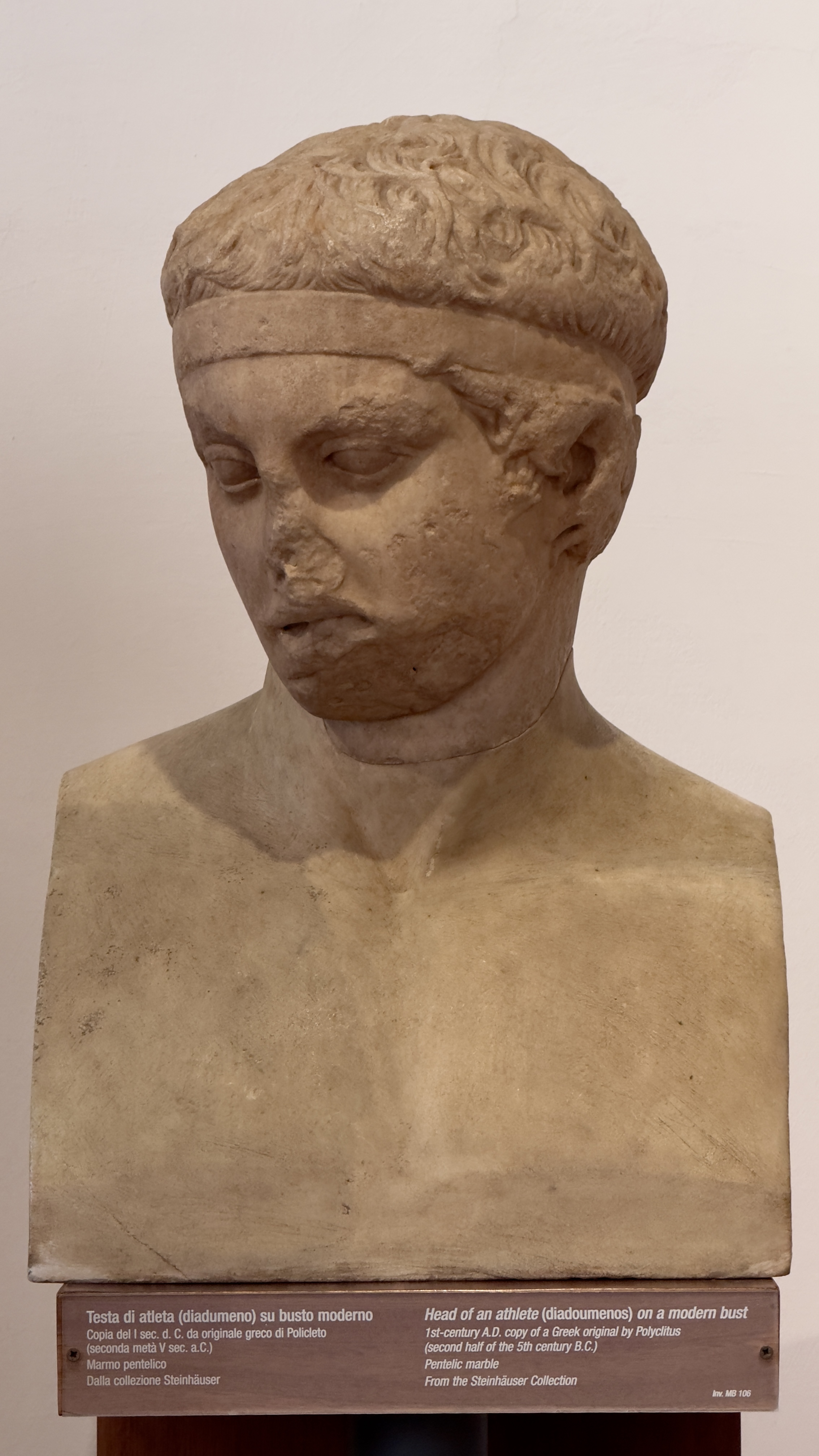

=== Medieval ===
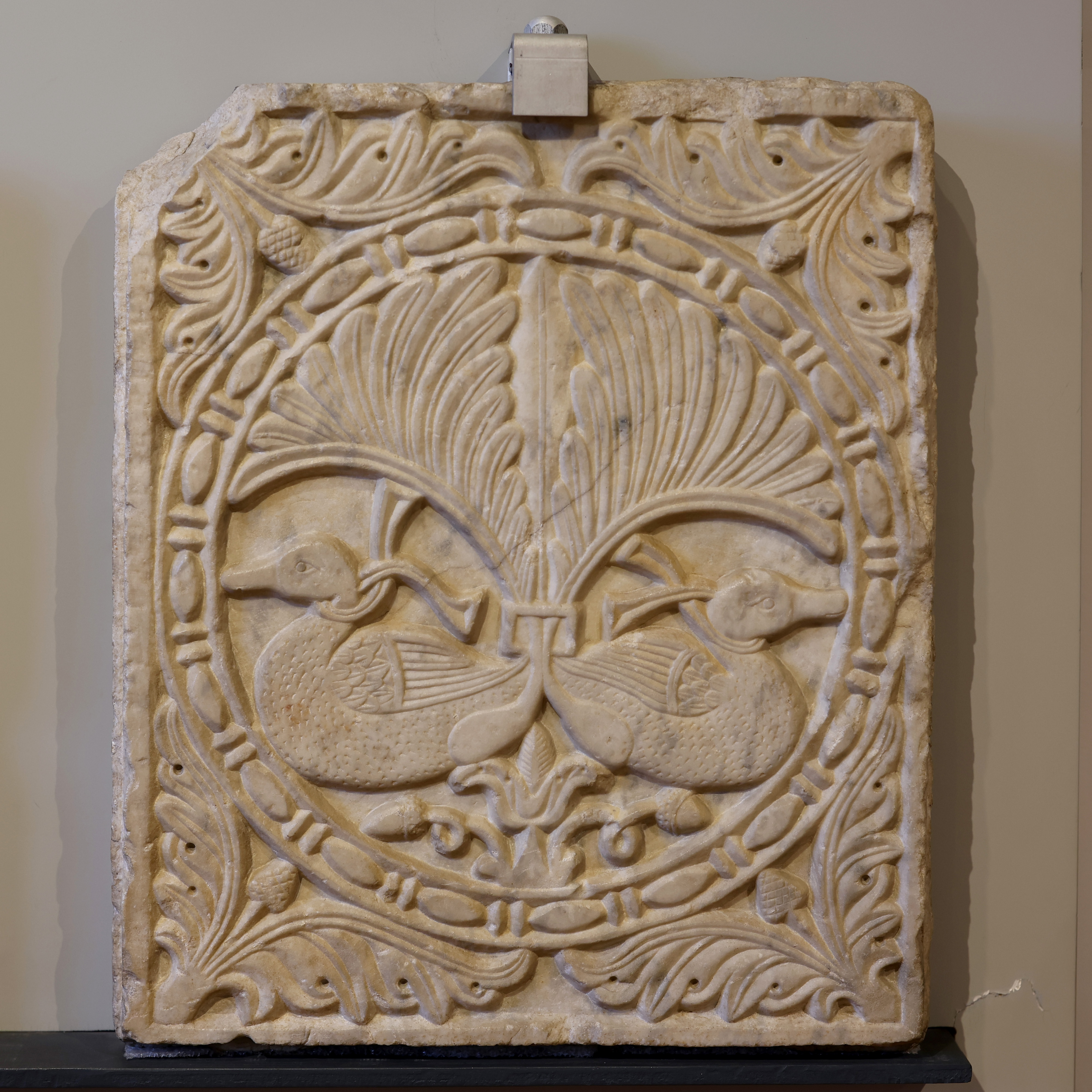

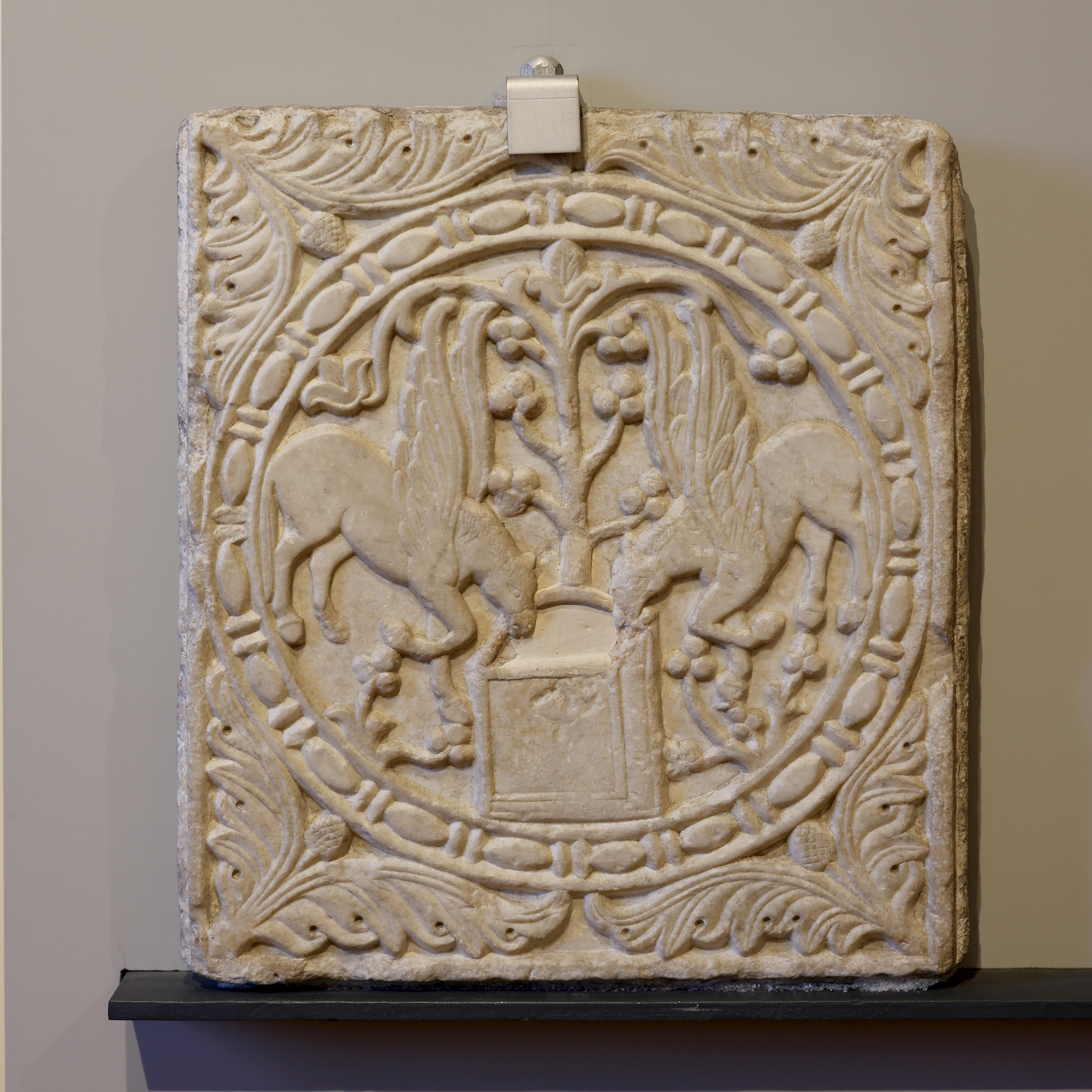

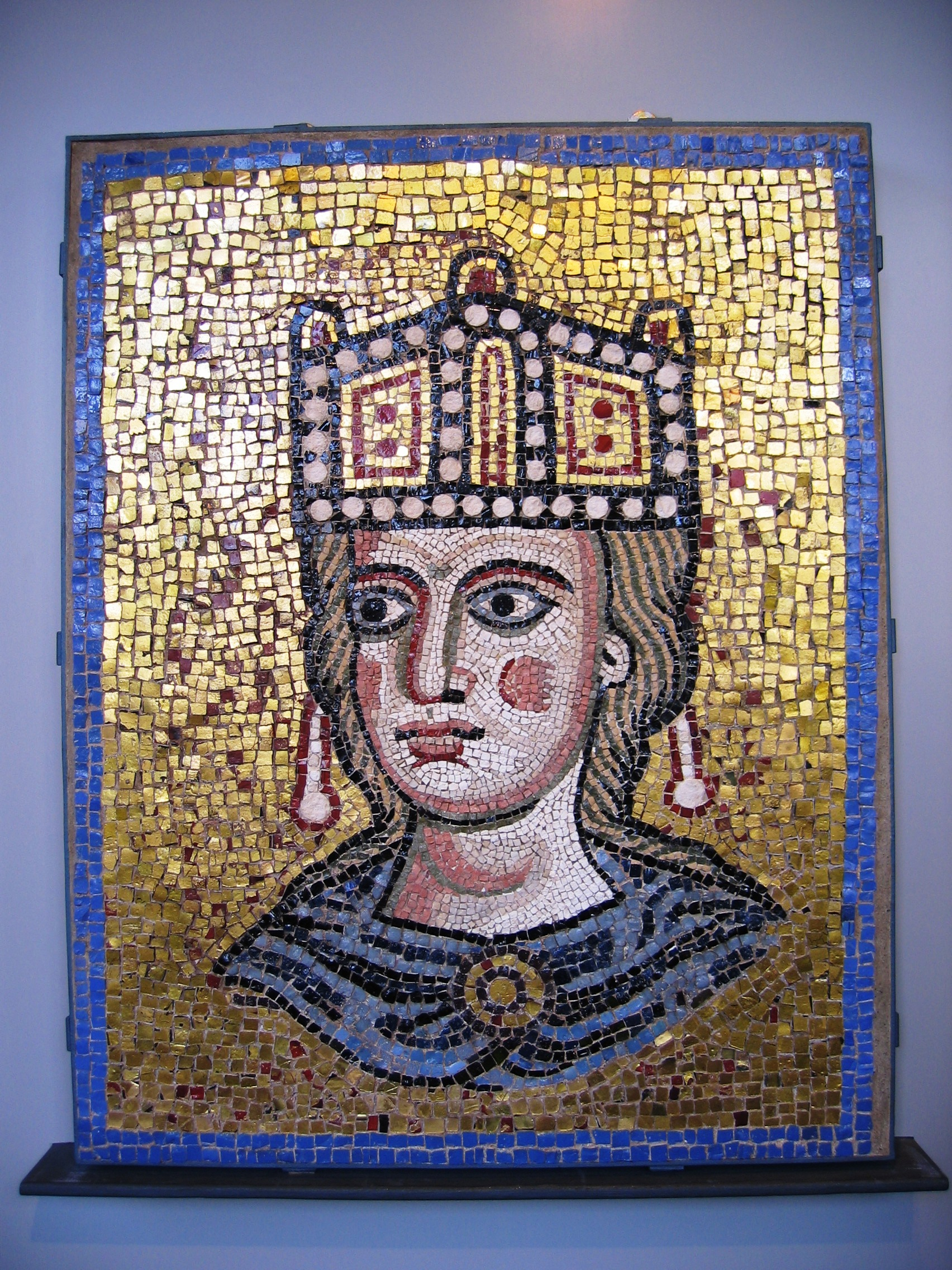

Preceded by Museo Archeologico Ostiense	Landmarks of Rome; Museo Barracco di Scultura Antica	Succeeded by Museo Civico di Zoologia
