= Clare Balding =

English broadcaster, journalist, TV presenter and author (born 1971)

Clare Balding CBE
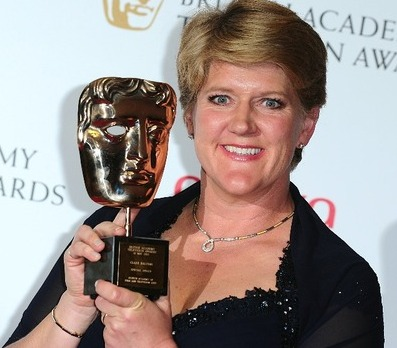
- Balding in 2017
- Born: Clare Victoria Balding; 29 January 1971 (age 55); Kingsclere, Hampshire, England
- Education: Newnham College, Cambridge
- Occupations: Television and radio presenter; journalist; jockey
- Years active: 1994–present
- Employers: BBC; Channel 4; RFL
- Spouse: Alice Arnold (m. 2015)
- Parents: Ian Balding (father); Emma Hastings-Bass (mother)
- Relatives: Andrew Balding (brother); Gerald Barnard Balding Sr. (grandfather); Toby Balding (uncle); Ivor G. Balding (great-uncle); Ruth Wood, Countess of Halifax (great-aunt)
- Clare Balding's voice from the BBC programme Desert Island Discs, 12 January 2013

Clare Victoria Balding (born 29 January 1971) is an English broadcast journalist and author, who presents programmes for BBC Sport and Channel 4, and previously for BT Sport. She also formerly presented Good Morning Sunday on BBC Radio 2. Balding served as President of the Rugby Football League between July 2020 and December 2022.

== Early life and family ==
Clare Victoria Balding was born on 29 January 1971, the daughter of racehorse trainer Ian Balding and Emma Balding, daughter of racehorse trainer Peter Hastings-Bass, of the Earls of Huntingdon. She was privately educated at the independent Downe House School near Thatcham, Berkshire, where she was head girl and a contemporary of comedian Miranda Hart (Hart and Balding are tenth-cousins, sharing a nine-times-great-grandfather in Sir William Leveson-Gower, 4th Baronet).

Balding applied to read law at Christ's College, Cambridge, but failed her interview and realised that law was not what she most wanted to do. She later successfully applied to Newnham College, Cambridge, and read English. While at university she was President of the Cambridge Union Society in Easter 1992 and graduated in 1993 with a 2:1 honours degree.

From 1988 to 1993, Balding was a leading amateur flat jockey and Champion Lady Rider in 1990. Her memoir My Animals and Other Family, which documents her life growing up in a racing yard, won the National Book Award for "Autobiography of the Year" in 2012.

Balding has close family links to horse racing: her father, Ian Balding, trained Mill Reef, 1971 winner of The Derby, Prix de l'Arc de Triomphe and King George VI and Queen Elizabeth Stakes; and her younger brother, Andrew Balding, trained Casual Look, the winner of the 2003 Epsom Oaks. The latter win led to a very emotional post-race interview with her brother. Her uncle Toby Balding trained winners in the Grand National, Cheltenham Gold Cup and Champion Hurdle. Furthermore, her maternal grandfather was the trainer Peter Hastings-Bass, and her maternal uncle William Hastings-Bass, 17th Earl of Huntingdon was once trainer to Queen Elizabeth II. Her maternal grandmother, Priscilla Hastings, was descended from the Earls of Derby and was one of the first women elected to membership of the Jockey Club.

== Broadcasting career ==
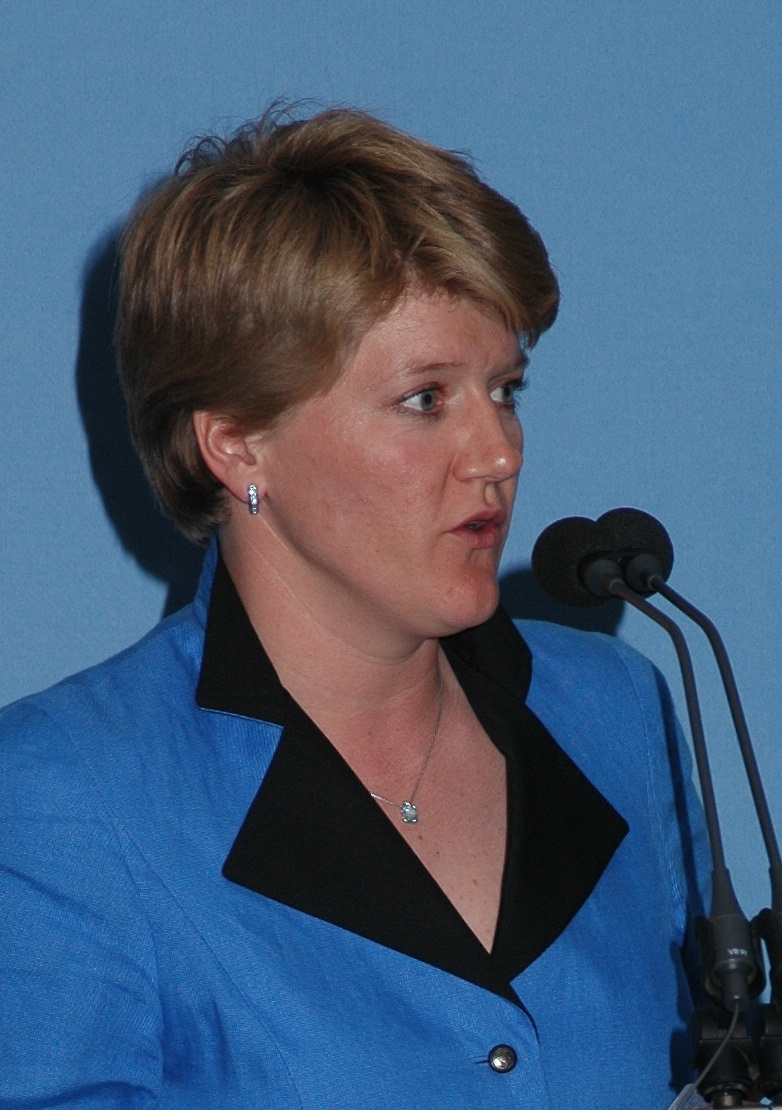
Balding in 2005

Balding became a trainee with BBC National Radio in 1994, working on BBC Radio 5 Live, Radio 1 (presenting the sport on the Chris Evans Breakfast Show), Radio 2 and Radio 4. In June 1995, she made her debut as a television presenter, introducing highlights of Royal Ascot. The following year she began presenting live, and in December 1997 she became the BBC's lead horse racing presenter after the retirement of Julian Wilson. In his autobiography Some You Win, published in 1998, Wilson revealed he had a strained relationship with Balding which led to him retiring in 1997. Balding has fronted coverage of the Grand National.

Balding has reported from eight Olympic Games, starting for BBC Radio in Atlanta and for BBC Television in Sydney. For the Athens 2004 Games, Balding presented nightly highlights with Craig Doyle For the Beijing 2008 Games, Balding fronted coverage throughout the night of the early action from China. At the London 2012 Games, Balding anchored afternoon coverage, as well as being live from the diving, equestrian and swimming events. For the Rio 2016 Games, Balding presented the evening action with Mark Chapman, as well as being live from the velodrome. For the delayed Tokyo 2020 Games, Balding hosted the BBC's coverage of the opening and closing ceremonies, as well as a nightly highlights show with Alex Scott. Balding again hosted coverage of the ceremonies for the Paris 2024 Games, as well as presenting the evening action from the studio and the swimming pool.

Balding has also presented from seven Winter Olympic Games for the BBC. Balding was one of the lead presenters for the 2002 Salt Lake City Games. This was a position she took up again for the Turin 2006 Games. For the Vancouver 2010 Games, Balding anchored evening coverage of the events. In Sochi in 2014, Balding was a lead presenter of the Games. For the Pyeongchang 2018 Games, Balding was again a lead presenter. For the Beijing 2022 Games, Balding fronted a nightly highlights show of the day's events. At the 2026 Milano Cortina Games, Balding was the BBC's lead presenter, anchoring coverage of the evening's action live from Cortina d'Ampezzo.

Balding has presented from five Commonwealth Games. At the Melbourne 2006 Games, Balding was one of the BBC's main presenters at the games. At the Delhi 2010 Games, Balding took up the same position. At the Glasgow 2014 Games, Balding presented from various events across the city, as well as co-hosting a nightly highlights show with Mark Chapman. At the Gold Coast 2018 Games, Balding anchored coverage live from Salford. For the Birmingham 2022 Games, Balding was the BBC's main presenter, anchoring the evening sessions of the games.

She has presented five Paralympic Games. She hosted the BBC's rugby league coverage, having presented Grandstand from a Rugby League Challenge Cup semi-final, and having been so impressed by the vibrancy and physical challenge of the sport she asked to cover further rugby league events. She was the last person to present Sunday Grandstand.

She also presents the Lord Mayor's Show as well as other live events for the BBC, such as Trooping the Colour, New Year's Eve and lead commentary for the Platinum Jubilee of Queen Elizabeth II. Balding has presented coverage of Crufts for the BBC from 2004 to 2009 and for Channel 4 since 2013.

She also presents the walking programme Ramblings for BBC Radio 4, where she walks and talks with one or more devotees of a particular route, area or activity. She has presented the programme since 2000 and has, for example, walked sections of the Lyke Wake Walk and Dales Way for the programme. Balding worked on BBC Radio 5 Live's Wimbledon coverage from 1995 to 2014. There has been some criticism of her in this role, with critics stating she lacks knowledge and enthusiasm. She has also presented coverage of The Boat Race for the BBC since 2010, including the first live coverage of the women's Boat Race on the Tideway in 2015.

In 2010, Balding presented a BBC TV series called Britain By Bike that retraced some of Harold Briercliffe's British cycle tours.

In August 2011, Balding joined BBC's Countryfile, temporarily replacing Julia Bradbury while Bradbury was on maternity leave, co-hosting the show with Matt Baker. Bradbury returned in February 2012.

From February to March 2012 Balding presented Sport and the British on BBC Radio 4, a thirty-part series looking at the impact of sports on British life.

Balding was a lead presenter on Channel 4's 2012 Summer Paralympics TV coverage. In August 2012 it was reported that Balding would be presenting Channel 4's racing coverage, while still retaining an option to work for the BBC on non-racing programmes such as rugby league.

In October 2012, she appeared before an All Party Parliamentary Group on women's sport, with Katherine Grainger, Hope Powell and Tanni Grey-Thompson. "Women having freedom to play sport leads directly to women having political freedom", said Balding. In 2013, to mark the centenary of Emily Wilding Davison's fatal intervention in the 1913 Derby, Balding presented a documentary about Davison for Channel 4 called Secrets of the Suffragettes. Also in 2013, she presented a BBC documentary about the Queen called The Queen – a Passion for Horses. Other factual documentaries for the BBC have included Britain By Bike, Operation Wild, and Britain's Hidden Heritage.

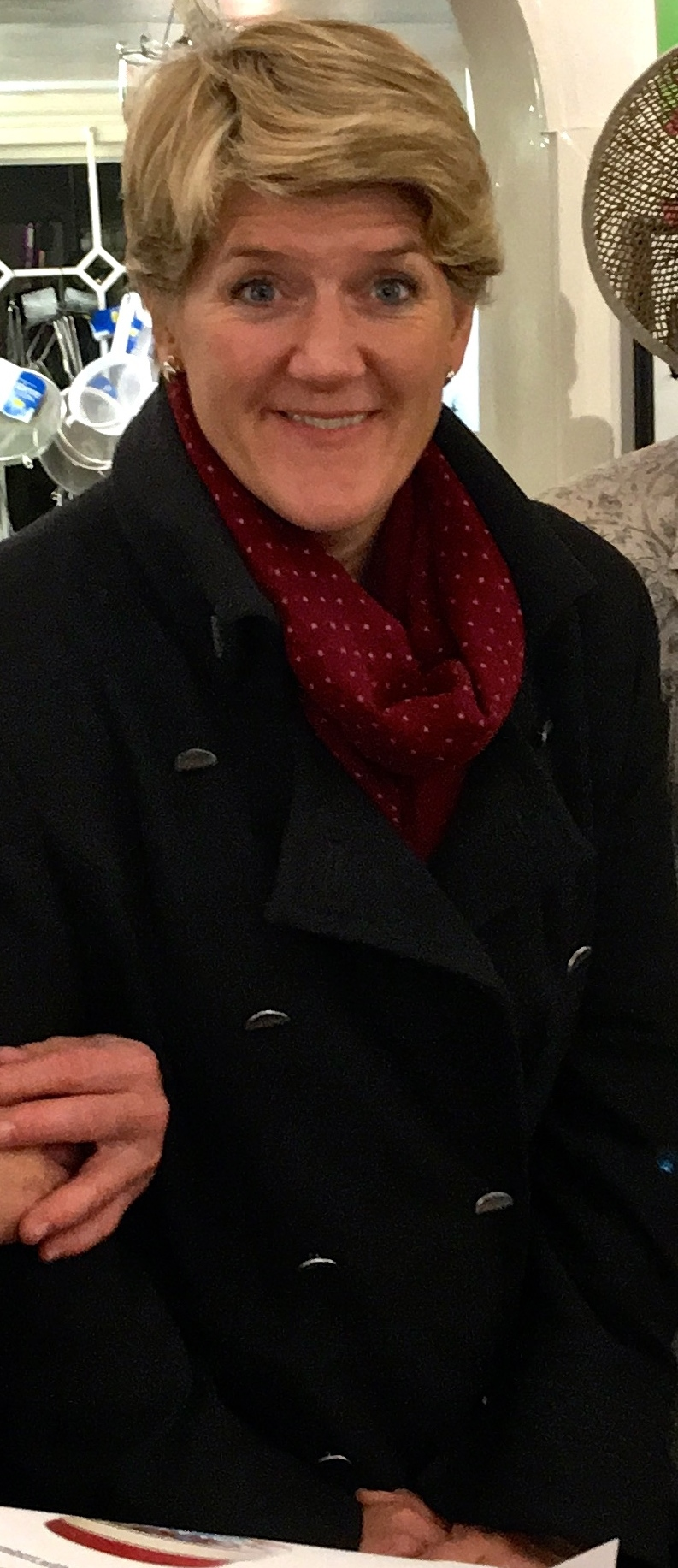
Balding in 2015

She serves as one of the presenters on BBC Sports Personality of the Year. Balding was the presenter of Good Morning Sunday on BBC Radio 2 from January 2013 to November 2017; leaving the show due to schedule changes which would not allow her to continue to present the programme and do other work. Balding also presented a Saturday night quiz show for BBC One called Britain's Brightest, which began in January 2013. She was a senior presenter on Channel 4 Racing, from 2013 to 2016, predominantly fronting coverage of major festivals such as Cheltenham and Royal Ascot. Since 2015, she has fronted Today at Wimbledon for the BBC. Balding became the BBC's lead presenter for Wimbledon in 2023, replacing Sue Barker who retired in 2022.

Balding hosted her own sports chat show called The Clare Balding Show, which aired on BT Sport and BBC Two. Guests have included Lewis Hamilton, Tom Daley, Mike Tyson, Martina Navratilova, Frankie Dettori, Judy Murray and Ronnie O'Sullivan. The show last aired in 2016.

In May 2025, Balding was announced as a contestant on the first series of The Celebrity Traitors. Balding was selected as a Faithful but was ultimately banished in the fourth episode. When asked to describe her time on the show in three words, Balding described it as "Immersive, unforgettable and intense." In 2026, she appeared on an episode of Celebrity Sabotage.

== Writing ==
Balding has written columns for The Sporting Life, Racing Post, Sunday Telegraph, The Evening Standard and Stylist and currently writes a regular weekly sports column for Waitrose Weekend.

She signed a deal with Viking Press to write an autobiography entitled My Animals and Other Family, which was published in September 2012. My Animals and Other Family reached Number One in The Sunday Times Bestseller list and has been translated into Italian, Mandarin and Hungarian. Her second book, Walking Home: My Family and other Ramblings, was published in September 2014. Her first adult novel, Pastures New, was published in September 2025.

In 2017, journalist Ginny Dougary alleged that Balding or her agent rewrote part of an interview that she gave to Saga magazine, provoking Dougary to remove her byline from the interview. According to Dougary, Balding removed sections of the text and inserted promotional material about her new book, as well as details of her hosting of the women's European football championships. Dougary also alleged that Balding added the words "And indeed she [Balding] sparkles all the way through the photo shoot," despite Dougary commenting that this was not the case and that Balding was rather "a brisk, jolly-hockey-sticks type". In a statement, Saga claimed that it had not given Balding copy control and that the interview was edited in conjunction with the author.

== Honours, awards and assessment ==
Balding was appointed Officer of the Order of the British Empire (OBE) in the 2013 Birthday Honours for services to broadcasting and journalism. In the same year, Balding was presented with the special BAFTA for her work on the 2012 Olympics and Paralympics.

Balding won the Royal Television Society's "Sports Presenter of the Year" in 2003 and "Presenter" in 2012. Also in 2003, she won the "Racing Journalist of the Year Award" and has followed up with the award for "Racing Broadcaster of the Year".

In December 2012, she was awarded the "Biography/Autobiography of the Year" award of the National Book Awards for My Animals and Other Family.

She won an achievement award from the UK chapter of the Women in Film and Television in 2012 for her coverage of the Olympics and Paralympics.

Balding was awarded the 2012 Sports Journalists' Association's annual British Sports Journalism Award for Sports Broadcaster of the Year (BBC and Channel 4).

In February 2013 she was assessed as being one of the 100 most powerful women in the UK by Woman's Hour on BBC Radio 4. and also won the award for Sports Presenter at the Television and Radio Industries Club Awards.

Her other awards include Attitude Awards TV Personality of the Year 2012, TRIC Sports Presenter of the Year 2013, British Equestrian Federation Outstanding Journalist of the Year 2014, First Women Awards Lifetime Achievement 2015, the Horserace Writers' Association's Broadcaster of the Year award and awards from Tatler magazine.

Balding was made an Honorary Fellow of Newnham College, Cambridge in 2014.

She was appointed Commander of the Order of the British Empire (CBE) in the 2022 Birthday Honours for services to sport and charity.

== Personal life ==
Clare Balding formalised her relationship with Alice Arnold, then a BBC Radio 4 continuity announcer and newsreader, in September 2006 by entering into a civil partnership at Chiswick House. The couple lived with their Tibetan terrier, Archie. In April 2015, she and Arnold married in a private ceremony at the same venue. They live in Chiswick, west London.

On 29 May 2009, Balding announced that she had thyroid cancer. She promised to be back on television covering the Epsom Derby, by the following Saturday. On 21 August 2009, she announced that the radioactive iodine had been successful with no signs of the cancer having spread.

In July 2010, Balding made a complaint to the Press Complaints Commission over an article by writer A. A. Gill in The Sunday Times that she felt had mocked her sexuality and appearance and for which the newspaper declined to apologise. The PCC found in her favour, judging that Gill had "refer[red] to the complainant's sexuality in a demeaning and gratuitous way". In 2014, she was named in the top 10 on the World Pride Power list.

After Liam Treadwell's Grand National victory on 4 April 2009, Balding interviewed him and made fun of his apparently bad teeth. Balding later clarified on BBC's Have I Got News for You quiz that she believed Treadwell, who suffered from microdontia and hypodontia, to have had his teeth "kicked out" by a horse, a common injury suffered by jockeys, apologising again for her error. However, Treadwell stated that he was pleased with her comment, as a dentist offered to fix his teeth at no cost. "It was the best thing Clare ever said", Treadwell said.

In 2014, Balding publicly backed Hacked Off and its campaign towards UK press self-regulation by "safeguarding the press from political interference while also giving vital protection to the vulnerable."

== Ancestors ==
Balding's aristocratic lineage on her mother's side can be seen in records that TheGenealogist has identified in research. Researchers found Balding's maternal line reveals that she is the great-granddaughter of Sir Malcolm Bullock, a Member of Parliament, whose sexuality had to be kept hidden because homosexuality was illegal in Britain. His sexuality was investigated in her episode of the Who Do You Think You Are? programme first broadcast in July 2017. Balding's paternal grandfather Gerald Balding, was a 10-goal polo player who immigrated to America to play polo in the 1920s when he was in his 20s. Outbound passenger lists on a genealogy website include Balding's grandfather and it was at this time that Gerald Balding Sr met and later married the American heiress, Eleanor Hoagland. During the show, Balding discovered her great-great-great-grandfather was Joseph Hoagland who, in 1866, founded the Royal Baking Powder Company with his brother, Cornelius. Through pioneering use of mass advertising campaigns, they contributed to building one of the largest producers of baking powder in the U.S.

Balding's matrilineal great-great-grandparents Edward Stanley, 17th Earl of Derby and Lady Alice Montagu, both descended from Henry VII. The earl's lineage can also be traced back to Sir Thomas Frankland.

She is also descended, via Joseph C. Hoagland, from Sarah Rapelje, the first woman of European descent born in what is now New York, to Dutch-settler parents.

Ancestors of Clare Balding

16. William Thomas John Balding (1855–1881)
8. Albert Charles Balding (1874–1947)
17. Anna Maria (Mary Ann) Burn (1853–1914)
4. Gerald Matthews Balding
18. John Barnard Matthews (ABT 1819–1900)
9. Florence Mabel Matthews (1877–1963)
19. Mary Ann Jane Brooks (1846–1899)
2. Ian Balding
20. Raymond Hoagland (1866–1927), son of Joseph C. Hoagland
10. Joseph Christoffel Hoagland (1889–1967)
21. Rosa Porter (1867–1942)
5. Eleanor Hoagland (1915–1985)
22. William Satterlee Packer Prentice (1852–1923)
11. Eleanor Sheldon Prentice (d. 1967)
23. Ella Crawford Sheldon (1855–1909)
1. Clare Balding
24. Francis Hastings, 14th Earl of Huntingdon (1841–1885)
12. Hon. Aubrey Hastings (1878–1929)
25. Mary Westenra (1847–1894)
6. Peter Hastings-Bass
26. Thomas Forsyth Forrest (1858–1942)
13. Winifred Forsyth Forrest (1887–1977)
27. Marion Hilda Goldie (1862–1947)
3. Hon. Emma Hastings-Bass (1949–)
28. Frank Bullock (1850–1926)
14. Sir Harold Bullock, 1st Baronet
29. Isabel Charlotte Wood (1857–)
7. Priscilla Bullock
30. Edward Stanley, 17th Earl of Derby
15. Lady Victoria Stanley (1892–1927)
31. Lady Alice Montagu

== Charitable activity ==
Balding has been a presenter on Sport Relief since its inception in 2002. She also participated in a celebrity edition of The Apprentice to raise money for charity. Sport Relief Does The Apprentice is part of the BBC's annual charity initiative and aired on 12 and 14 March 2008. "The Girls' team", which also included Louise Redknapp, Jacqueline Gold, Kirstie Allsopp and Lisa Snowdon, won the contest, raising over £400,000 from ticket sales and sales on the night of the big event at their shop.

In 2010, Balding became a patron of the British Thyroid Foundation.

In 2015, Balding became an ambassador for Southampton FC's official charity, the Saints Foundation.

She is also patron to a number of other charities including Riding for the Disabled, British Paralympic Association, Diversity Role Models, The Mintridge Foundation and the Jane Tomlinson Appeal. Plus she is Vice-Patron for Injured Jockeys Fund and Helen Rollason Cancer Charity.

== Rugby league ==
After fronting the BBC coverage of the sport for several years, Balding was appointed as the 30th President of the Rugby Football League in July 2020 succeeding former footballer Tony Adams. The RFL Council appointed role undertakes a two-year term which Balding served from July 2020 to December 2022. She stated that during her tenure she wanted to see the women's game become a professional sport.

== See also ==
- List of significant families in British horse racing

Awards
Preceded by Gary Lineker	RTS Television Sport Awards; Best Sports Presenter; 2003	Succeeded by Gary Lineker
