= Joseph C. Hoagland =

American businessman

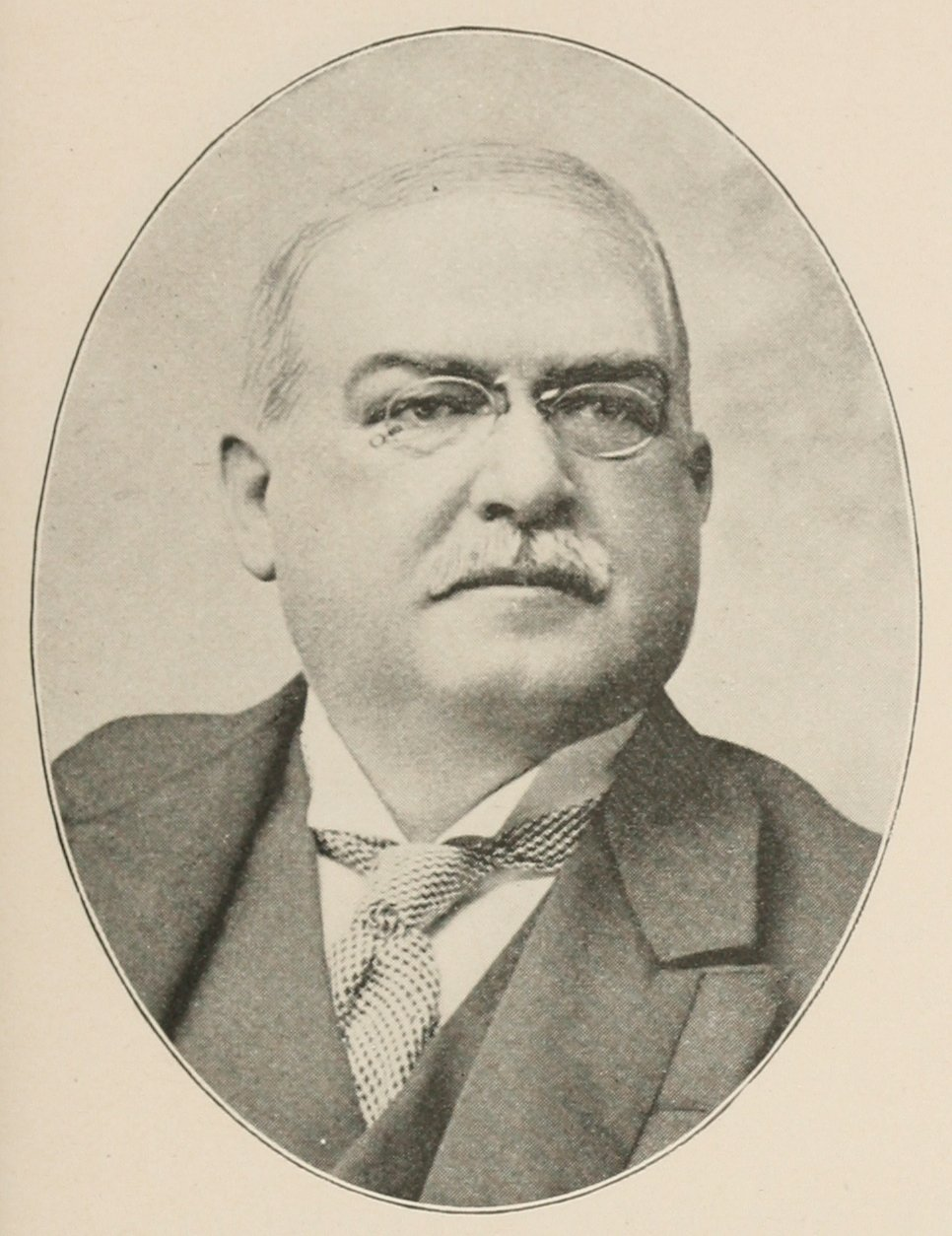
- Portrait from Notable New Yorkers of 1896–1899 : a companion volume to King's handbook of New York City by Moses King

President of the Royal Baking Powder Company
- In office 1860–1899

Presidential elector at the 1880 United States presidential election
- In office November 2, 1880 – November 2, 1880

Personal details
- Born: Joseph Christoffel Hoagland; June 19, 1841 Troy, Ohio, U.S.
- Died: December 8, 1899 (aged 58) Manhattan, New York, U.S.
- Resting place: Green-Wood Cemetery, Brooklyn, New York, U.S.
- Spouse: Caroline Compton Matlock (m. 1865)
- Children: 5
- Occupation: Businessman, industrialist, civil servant

Joseph Christoffel Hoagland (June 19, 1841 – December 8, 1899) was an American businessman, industrialist and civil servant who founded and presided the Royal Baking Powder Company. Hoagland also served as presidential elector at the 1880 United States presidential election.

== Early life and education ==
Hoagland was born June 19, 1841 in Troy, Ohio, the fourth of five children, to Andrew Lyle Hoagland (1795–1872) and Jane Hoagland (née Hoagland; 1799–1880). His parents were from New Jersey, descendants of the founding Dutch families of New Amsterdam (the original spelling of the family name was Hoogland).

The family began in the Americas with a Dutch settler to New Amsterdam, Dirck Jansen Hoogland, who arrived in 1657. He married Annetje Hans Bergen, the daughter of Hans Hansen Bergen and Sarah Rapalje. (Sarah Rapelje was born in Fort Orange (now Albany) 1625 to Joris Jansen Rapalje (1604-1662) and Catalyntje Trico [1605-1689]. Sarah’s parents had come over from Holland to New Netherland on the first ship to bring the first immigrants to New Netherland in 1624, and Sarah was the first woman of European descent born on the island of Manhattan.

== Career ==
In 1866 Joseph Christoffel Hoagland, his brother Cornelius Nevius Hoagland and Thomas Biddle organized the Royal Chemical Company, which later became the Royal Baking Powder Company. In 1868 they moved to New York, where John H. Seal and William Ziegler became agents of the company and later shareholders.

Joseph C. Hoagland lived on Fifth Avenue, and worked at 171 Duane Street where he manufactured a brand that made millions of dollars. A culinary revolution was started by the powder that made cake rise and gave it more flavour. Hoagland excelled in marketing and branding their product with such logos such as "absolutely pure" that rendered it better advertised than other bakers. By the close of 19th century Royal Baking Powder was on six continents, a truly international brand. Hoagland was one of the "kings of New York" business world.

He had an acrimonious split with his business partner, William Ziegler in 1888.

== Politics ==
Hoagland was a presidential elector in the 1880 presidential election.

== Personal life ==
On May 9, 1865, Hoagland married Caroline Compton Matlock (1842–1924), a daughter of John Matlock and Catherine Matlock (née Compton), in Montgomery, Ohio. They had five children;

- Raymond J. Hoagland (1866–1927), married Rosa Wood Porter (1867–1942), four children.
- Helen Eliza Hoagland (1866–), never married
- John Andrew Hoagland (1871–1942), married Grace Leila Weir (1877–1964)
- Joseph C. Hoagland Jr. (1877–1878)
- Fanny Matlock Hoagland (1880–1941), married Edwin Drexel Godfrey (1880–1951), four children

Through his son, Raymond J. Hoagland, he is the great great great grandfather of Clare Balding, the BBC TV presenter, journalist and jockey. Joseph C. Hoagland died on December 8, 1899 in Manhattan.
