= Joris Jansen Rapelje =

Earliest Dutch settler of New Amsterdam

- Born: 28 April 1604; Valenciennes
- Died: 21 February 1662/1663; New Amsterdam
- Known for: Council of Twelve Men
- Spouse: Catalyntje Jeronimus Trico (1605-1689)
- Children: Sarah Rapelje; Maretje Maria Rapelje; Annetje; Janetje; Judith; Jan; Jacob (shot by Indians); Catalina; Jernonimus; Elizabeth; Daniel
- Parent(s): Jean de Rapareillet; Elizabeth Lodewyck Baudouin
- Relatives: Hans Hansen Bergen (Son-in-Law); Descendants: Michael Pauluzen Van der Voort; Cornelius Vanderbilt; Humphrey Bogart; Howard Dean; Clare Balding; Theodore Roosevelt

Joris Jansen Rapelje (28 April 1604 – 21 February 1662/63) was a member of the Council of Twelve Men in the Dutch West India Company colony of New Netherland. He and his wife Catalina (Catalyntje) Trico (1605–1689) were among the earliest settlers in New Netherland.

== Biography ==
Joris Rapelje and Catalina Trico were married 21 January 1624, at the Walloon Church of Amsterdam. Rapelje, an illiterate 19-year-old textile worker whose origin was noted in the registry as 'Valencenne' (Valenciennes, Spanish Netherlands), and his 18-year-bride, had no family present to witness the ceremony. Four days later, on 25 January, the couple departed from Amsterdam, bound for North America. He was of French Huguenot descent.

The Rapalje family were first employed at Fort Orange, in what would eventually become Albany, New York. Fort Orange was being erected by the Dutch West India Company as a trading post on the west bank of the Hudson River. It became the company's official outpost in the upper Hudson Valley. The families aboard these ships were principally Walloons, French-speaking residents of Valenciennes, Roubaix, Hainaut and related sites, now in Belgium's region of Wallonia and France's region of Nord-Pas-de-Calais, but then part of the Spanish Netherlands.

By 1626, Dutch authorities had relocated most settlers from Fort Orange to Fort Amsterdam at the southern end of Manhattan Island. The Rapeljes established a residence near the East River, and were among the earliest purchasers of land in Manhattan, later building two houses on Pearl Street near the Fort. In 1637, Rapalje purchased about 335 acres (1.36 km^{2}) around Wallabout Bay in what is now Brooklyn. His son-in-law Hans Hansen Bergen acquired a large tract adjoining Rapelje's tract. Today the land where the Rapalje's farm stood is the Brooklyn Navy Yard. In 1641, Rapalje was one of the Council of Twelve Men representing Manhattan, Breukelen and Pavonia. From 1655 through 1660, he was a magistrate of Brooklyn. He died in Breuckelen, New Netherland.

== Family ==
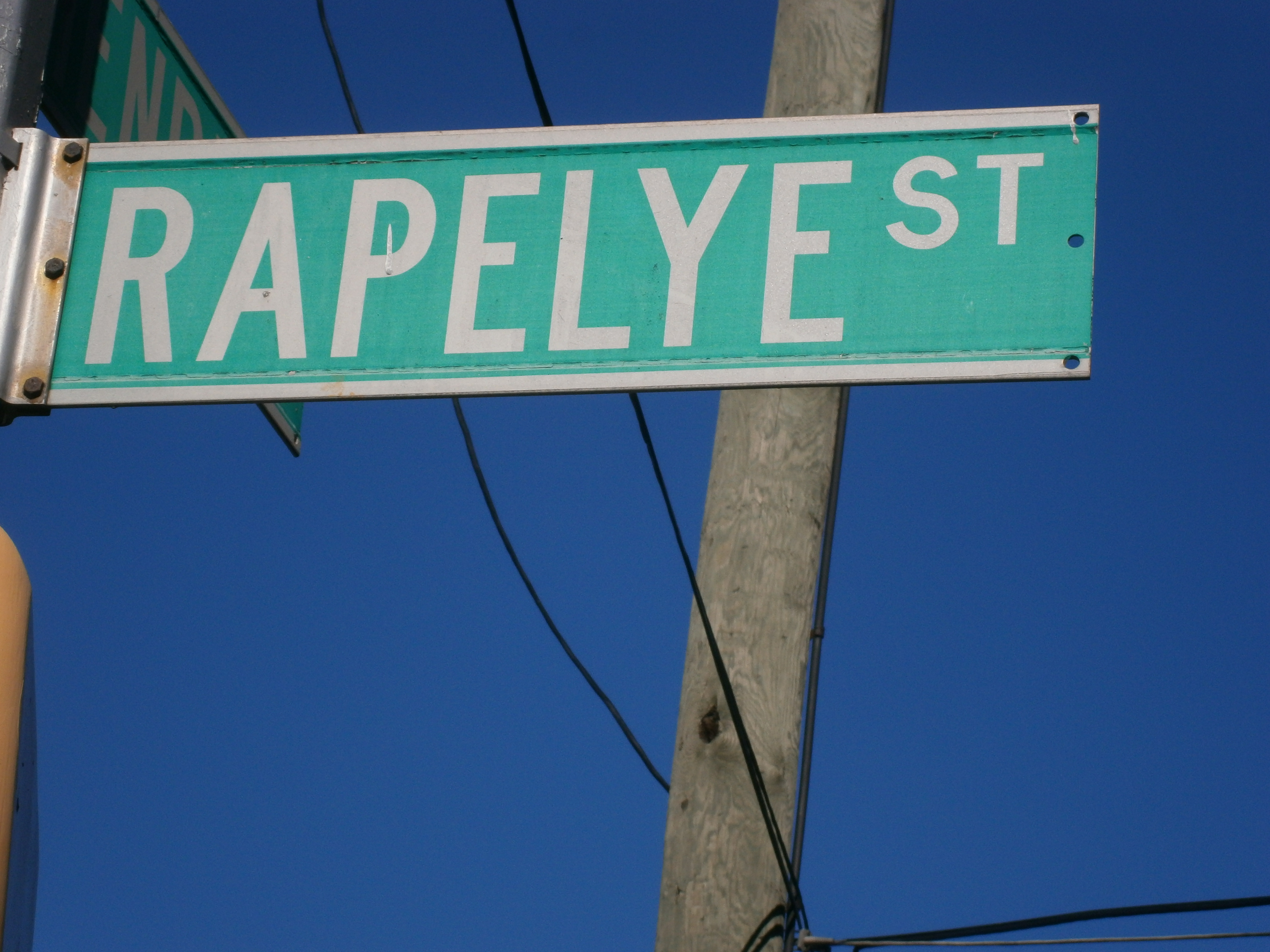
Rapelye Street sign

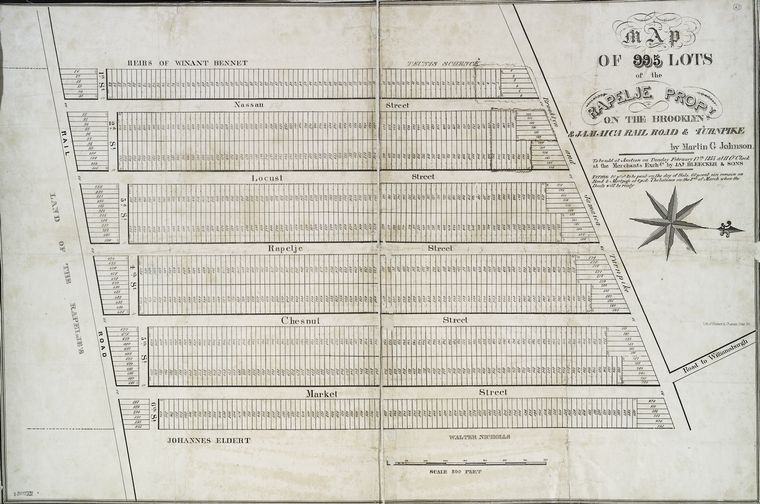
Property of the Rapelje family, Brooklyn, ca. 1835

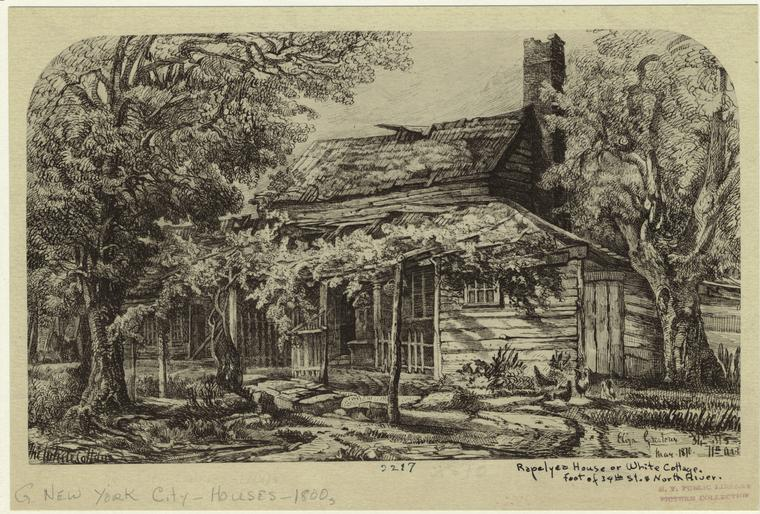
Home of the Rapelje family, foot of 34th Street and the North River. Drawing by Eliza Pratt Greatorex

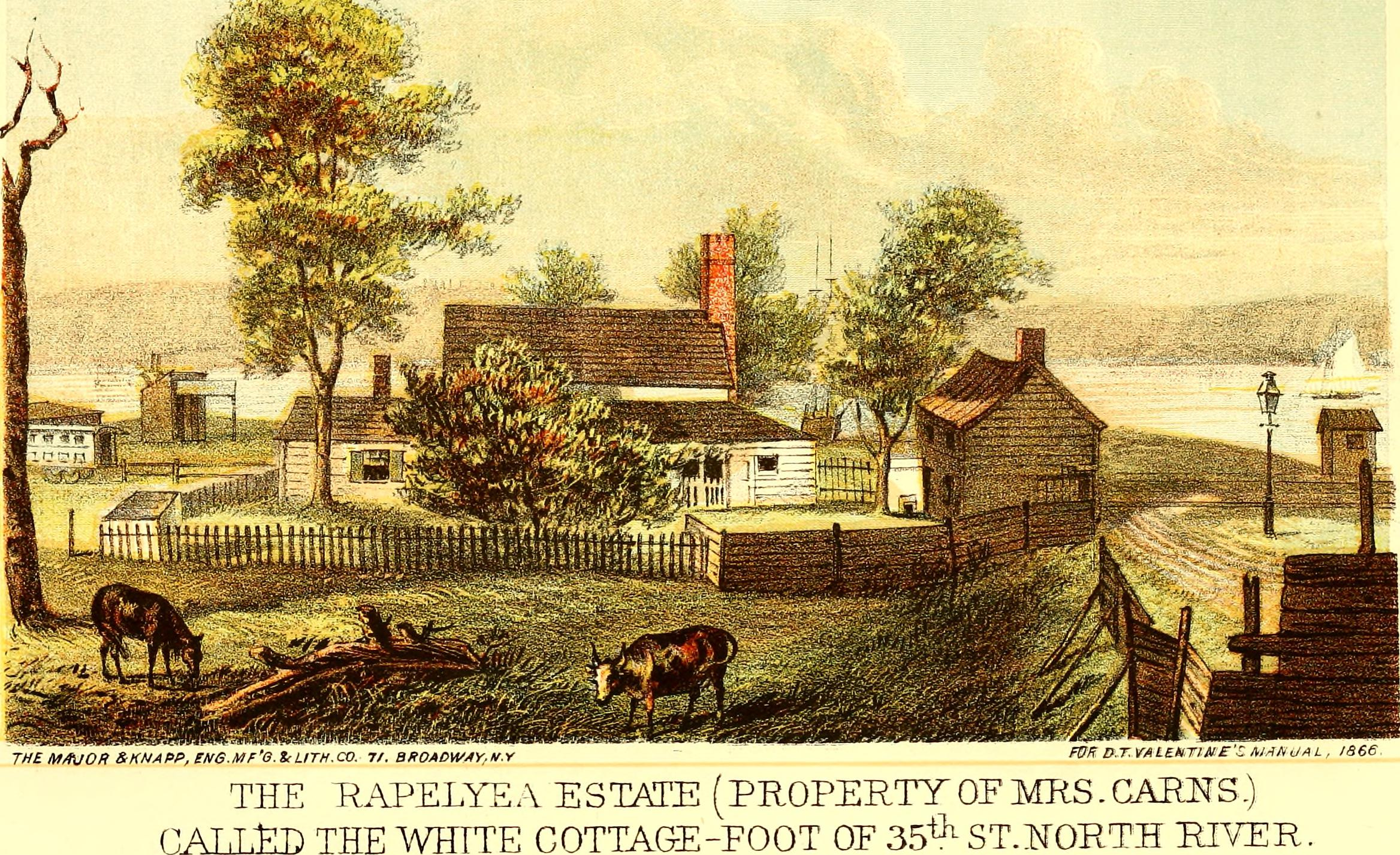
Rapelye Estate, 45th Street, North River

Joris Jansen Rapelje and Catalina Trico were the parents of 11 children, including Sarah Rapelje, the first female child of European parentage born in New Netherland. Sarah Rapelje's chair is in the collection of the Museum of the City of New York, and is thought to have been brought to New Netherland by the family.

Their daughter Jannetje married another Vanderbeek; Rem Jansen Vanderbeek, whose descendants took the name Remsen and who became a leading New York mercantile family.

Because of the number of their descendants, author Russell Shorto has called Joris Jansen and his wife Catalina "the Adam and Eve" of New Netherland as the number of their descendants has been estimated at about a million.

Brooklyn's Rapelye Street is named for the family. The spelling of the Rapelje family name varied over the years to include Rapelye, Rapalje, Rapareilliet, Raparlié, Rapalyea, Raplee, Rapelyea, Rapeleye, Rappleyea as well as others.

Rapelje, Montana is named for a family descendant, J. M. Rapelje, general manager and vice president of the Northern Pacific Railway.

== Other sources ==
- Bayer, Henry G. The Belgians: First Settlers in New York and in the Middle States (New York: The Devin-Adair Company. 1925)
- Bryan, Leslie A. Rapalje of New Netherlands (The Colonial Genealogist, vol. 3, no. 3, pp. 157–159. January 1971)
- Gehring, Charles T. Annals of New Netherland. The Essays of A. J. F. van Laer (New York: New Netherland Project. 1999)
- Gibson, James E. Some Ancestors of the Rappleye Family ( The Utah Genealogical Magazine, vol. 28, pp. 9–13. 1937)
- Koenig, Dorothy A. & Pim Nieuwenhuis. "Catalina Trico from Namur (1605-1689) and her nephew, Arnoldus de la Grange," New Netherland Connections 1 (1996): pp. 55–63, 89-93 (addenda).
- McCracken, George E. Catelyntje Trico Rapalje (The American Genealogist 35: pp. 193–200. 1959)
- McCracken, George E. Joris Janzsen Rapalje of Valenciennes and Catelyntje Jeronimus Trico of Pry (The American Genealogist 48: pp. 118–20. 1972)
- Ryerse, Phyllis A., & Ryerson, Thomas A. The Ryerse-Ryerson Family 1574-1994 (Ryerse-Ryerson Family Association, Ingersoll, Ontario, Canada, pp. 7–9. 1994)
- Sharpin, Armida. Rapelje Rasters: A Genealogy (Valparaiso, IN, 1994)
- Shorto, Russell The Island at the Center of the World. The Epic Story of Dutch Manhattan, the Forgotten Colony that Shaped America (New York: Doubleday. 2004)
- Van Winkle, Donald J. Rapalje of New Netherlands (The Colonial Genealogist, vol. 4, no. 3, pp. 152–157. Winter 1972)
- Zabriskie, George Olin. "The Founding Families of New Netherland, no. 4: The Rapalje-Rapelje Family," De Halve Maen, vol. 46, no. 4 (Jan. 1972): pp. 7–8, 16; vol. 47, no. 1 (April? 1972): pp. 11–13; vol. 47, no. 2 (July 1972): pp. 11–14.
