= Tithe map =

The term tithe map is usually applied to a map of an English or Welsh parish or township, prepared following the Tithe Commutation Act 1836. This act allowed tithes to be paid in cash rather than goods. The map and its accompanying schedule gave the names of all owners and occupiers of land in the parish. Individual tithe owners sometimes prepared maps for their own use to show who owned what land. These maps are sometimes also called tithe maps, although such maps are not common before 1836.

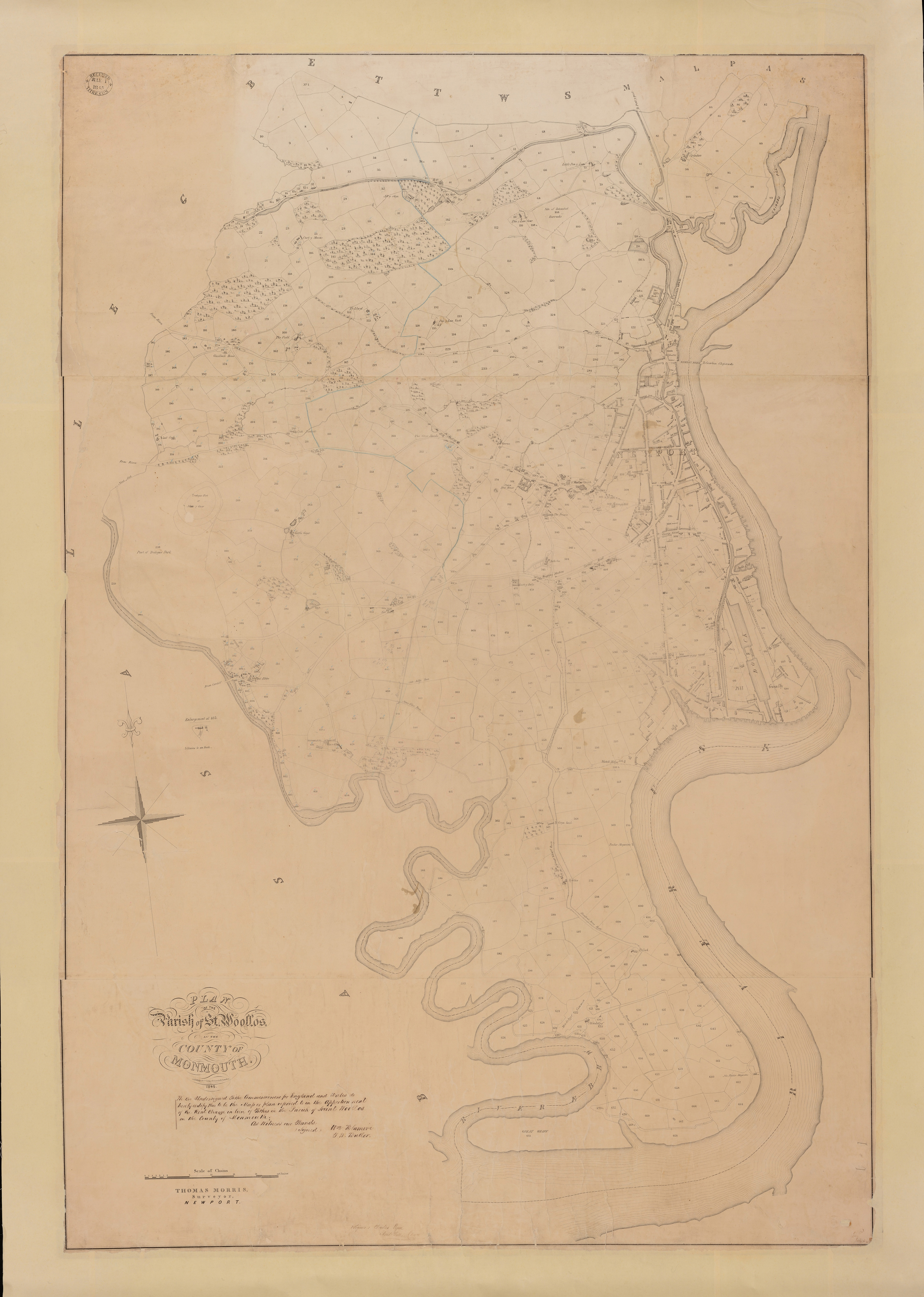
An example of a complete tithe map. Parish of St. Woollos, Newport. 1845

== Tithes ==
The payment in kind of one tenth of local produce to the church had been established in Anglo-Saxon England before the Norman Conquest. It originally supported the local priest, but in some cases the right to receive the tithe was acquired by an organisation such as a monastery or college, who paid a curate. With the dissolution of the monasteries, the right to receive tithes was acquired by a number of private landlords. In some instances, a tithe barn was built to hold the tithes. Tithes themselves were controversial, particularly among nonconformists who resented supporting the established church; and payment in kind was sometimes not convenient for either the farmer or the tithe owner.

== Conversion to cash payments ==
Over time, in some parishes, the tithe owner came to an agreement with the tithe payers to receive cash instead of farm produce. This could be for a fixed period of time or indefinitely. During the period of parliamentary enclosure, the various inclosure acts abolished tithes in many places in return for an allocation of land to the tithe owner. However, in many parishes, tithes continued to be paid in kind.

== Tithe Commutation Act 1836 ==
The Tithe Commutation Act 1836 and an amending act in 1837 established a procedure whereby tithes could be converted to money payments. This required the drawing of an accurate map (the accuracy of which was certified by commissioners) showing all the land in the parish. The series of maps resulting from this legislation provides unprecedented coverage, detail and accuracy.

The initial intention was to produce maps of the highest possible quality, but the expense (incurred by the landowners) led to the provision that the accuracy of the maps would be testified by the seal of the commissioners, and only maps of suitable quality would be so sealed. In the end, about one sixth of the maps had seals. A map was produced for each "tithe district", that is, a region in which tithes were paid as a unit. These could be distinct from parishes or townships. Areas in which tithes had already been commuted were not mapped, so that coverage varied widely from county to county. The maps indicated parcels of land and buildings, assigning each a number.

Each map was accompanied by a schedule listing each map item by number. This showed the owners, occupiers and a description of the land in the parish including individual fields - sometimes with field names. (The description might be short: house and barn, arable, etc.) A preamble gave the name of the tithe owner, the circumstances under which tithes were owed, and whether the apportionment was subject to an agreement between the parties, or was being imposed by the Crown. Most of the surveying and mapping was carried out by 1841, and the work was largely completed by 1851. In some cases amendments had to be filed when properties were divided or other circumstances intervened. The work was also complicated by numerous inconsistencies in the ways tithes were assessed. For example, timber might or might not include standing trees, branches, acorns, mast, and even charcoal. Variations as to the circumstances of tithe-paying were also considerable.

Three copies of these maps and schedules were prepared: one copy was held centrally by the Tithe Commissioners, one locally in the parish church and one in the diocesan registry.

== Maps ==
The maps and schedules held by the commissioners passed to the Inland Revenue (the predecessors of HMRC) and are now held in The National Archives at Kew (classes IR29 and IR30). In a partnership with The National Archives and a family history data website, TheGenealogist, it is possible to search the apportionments and view tithe maps. The black and white maps and apportionments that are online cover all that are available for England and Wales while there is an ongoing project by TheGenealogist to scan the originals in colour, some of which they have already made available.

Most of the extant parish copies are now held at the county record office. The diocesan copies for most Welsh parishes are held in the National Library of Wales at Aberystwyth. Prior to the publication of large scale Ordnance Survey maps in the late 19th century, tithe maps were frequently copied (in whole or part) for other purposes: for example in connection with planned railways, or as part of the title deeds transferred on a sale of land. More recently, tithe maps and apportionments have often been used for reference by genealogists and other historical researchers. For many parishes they provide the only large scale map showing the landscape prior to the Industrial Revolution, and they frequently provide the earliest evidence for the field system in the parish.

== See also ==
- Church tax
