= Helen Houghton =

Helen Houghton may refer to:

- Helen Houghton (comics), author and creator of Bugs Bunny comics
- Helen Houghton (politician), New Zealand politician and the leader of the New Conservative Party
- Helen Johnson Houghton (née Walwyn; 1910–2012), British racehorse trainer
