= William Hastings-Bass, 17th Earl of Huntingdon =

English Earl (born 1948)

Hastings family patrilineal arms

William Edward Robin Hood Hastings-Bass, 17th Earl of Huntingdon, LVO (born 30 January 1948), is an English hereditary peer and former racehorse trainer to Queen Elizabeth II.

He was a member of the House of Lords from 1990 to 1999.

== Early life ==
Hastings-Bass was educated at Winchester College and Trinity College, Cambridge. He is from an equestrian family: his father Peter Hastings-Bass and grandfather Aubrey Hastings were horse trainers; his mother, Priscilla Hastings, was also a racehorse owner and among the first women admitted as members of the Jockey Club.

He started in horse training as an assistant to Noel Murless and later worked in Australia with Bart Cummings and Colin Hayes.

== Career ==
He gained his trainer’s licence in 1976. Outside the world of racing, he took part in charitable work, driving a lorryload of supplies to Bosnia and taking part in a bicycle ride across Borneo and a safari in the Australian outback.

In August 1990, the 16th Earl of Huntingdon died without a son. Hastings-Bass, a great-grandson of the 14th Earl, inherited his peerages and joined the House of Lords.

From 1988 to 1998, Huntingdon ran his yard at West Ilsley, Berkshire, having taken over from Dick Hern. Horses he trained include Ascot Gold Cup winners Indian Queen and Drum Taps. He retired from horse training in 1998, citing financial problems.

After retiring as the Queen’s racehorse trainer, Huntingdon was appointed as a Lieutenant of the Royal Victorian Order (L.V.O.).

== Personal life ==
Huntingdon was married to Susan Warner from 1989 to 2001 and is the maternal uncle of racehorse trainer Andrew Balding and TV personality Clare Balding.

Peerage of England
Preceded by Francis Hastings	Earl of Huntingdon; 1990-present	Incumbent
