= Priscilla Hastings =

British racehorse owner and trainer

Priscilla Victoria Hastings (née Bullock, 28 February 1920 – 12 August 2010) was a British racehorse owner and trainer. She was one of the first three women to be elected as a member of the Jockey Club in December 1977, alongside her half-sister Ruth Wood (née Primrose), Countess of Halifax and Helen Johnson Houghton.

== Early and private life ==
Hastings was the daughter of Malcolm Bullock, who was a Conservative MP from 1923 to 1953 and became a baronet in 1954, and his wife Lady Victoria Bullock (née Stanley), the third child of Edward Stanley, 17th Earl of Derby. Her mother had previously married Neil Primrose, son of Archibald Primrose, 5th Earl of Rosebery, in 1915, but she was widowed in 1917, and had married Bullock in 1919. Lady Victoria Bullock was killed in an accident while hunting with the Quorn in November 1927, aged 35. Sir Malcolm Bullock died in 1966.

In 1947 she married Peter Hastings, son of Aubrey Hastings and grandson of Francis Hastings, 13th Earl of Huntingdon. Her father-in-law Aubrey Hastings trained four Grand National winners and had ridden the first - Ascetic's Silver - himself in 1906 (the horse had previously won the Irish Grand National in 1904). At the time of their marriage, Peter Hastings was an assistant racehorse trainer, and he began training at Kingsclere stables in 1953.

They had four children:

- William Hastings-Bass, a racehorse trainer, who inherited the title of Earl of Huntingdon in 1990
- Emma Hastings-Bass, who married Ian Balding and is the mother of trainer Andrew Balding and TV presenter Clare Balding
- Simon Hastings-Bass
- John Hastings-Bass

In 1954 Peter Hastings inherited the estate of his uncle, Sir William Bass and changed his surname to Hastings-Bass as required by his uncle's will. Their children also adopted the new surname but Priscilla Hastings kept her name unchanged. In 1953 they bought the 1,500 acres (610 ha) Kingsclere estate, near Newbury, Berkshire.

== Horse racing ==
Priscilla Hastings herself owned racehorses and was part-owner (with Cath Walwynm, wife of trainer Fulke Walwyn) of the horse Taxidermist, winner of the 1958 Hennessy Cognac Gold Cup. Taxidemist also won the 1958 Whitbread Gold Cup (now the Bet365 Gold Cup).

She also owned King's Troop, which headed a field of 38 to win the 1961 Royal Hunt Cup, and Murrayfield, which won the 1968 Coventry Stakes and Solario Stakes as a two-year-old and then finished "in the frame" in the 2,000 Guineas and St. James's Palace Stakes the following year.

Her husband died of cancer in 1964, aged 42. (His estate became involved in a lawsuit with the Inland Revenue which gave rise to a doctrine known as the "rule in Hastings-Bass" that allowed parties to declare decision void if they had results other than those originally intended.) She had effectively been training the horses during his final illness, but the Jockey Club refused to issue training licences to women until Florence Nagle won a court case in 1966, and so, after her husband's death, she was obliged to use a male assistant to hold the licence. The licence was officially taken over by the next trainer at Kingsclere, Ian Balding, who later married Hastings' daughter, Emma.

Hastings was a director of Newbury Racecourse and served as chairman of the racecourse. She was also a director of The Tote between 1984 and 1990 (only the second woman to hold that position). In 1977 the Jockey Club admitted female members for the first time in its 225-year history, and Hastings was one of the three initially admitted, together with her half-sister Ruth Wood (née Primrose), Countess of Halifax and Helen Johnson Houghton (who was the twin sister of Fulke Walwyn).

Priscilla Hastings died at Kingsclere aged 90. On the day of her death, the horse Cool Strike carried her black and yellow racing colours to third place at Newbury Racecourse.
