= Catalina Trico =

Early Dutch settler of New Amsterdam

- Born: Spanish Netherlands
- Spouse: Joris Jansen Rapelje
- Children: 11, including Sara Rapelje

Catalina Trico or Catalyntje Jeronimus Trico (also spelled Catilyn Trico; 1605 – 1689) was a Walloon colonist. Trico and her husband Joris Jansen Rapelje, both originally from Wallonia in modern day Belgium, were among the first European settlers in what was then the Dutch colony of New Netherland. Trico and Rapelje traveled on the ship Eendracht, arriving in New Netherland in 1624 and settling initially at Fort Orange.

== Early life ==
Catalina was born in what was then known as the Spanish Netherlands, an area that later became part of Belgium. Spanish rule touched the small town of Hainaut, where Catalyntje and her family lived, and began to quickly change life for them. These changes heaped heavy taxes on Catalyntje, her mother, Michele Sauvagie and her younger sister Margriet, leaving them impoverished. Additionally, they were Protestants, so they were also persecuted by those who were ruling at the time. To protect her young daughters from harm, Michele sent Catalyntje and Margriet north to find their half-sister, Marie in Amsterdam.

== Moving to the New World ==
Catalina and her husband were Walloons, French-speaking Protestants, practicing in the Calvinistic tradition. Trico stepped foot onto the New World when the ship dropped them and their shipmates in Fort Orange, present-day Albany, where they stayed for two years until Pieter Minuit, serving as governor of the colony, decided to consolidate the two outposts into one and that all should be resettled on Manhattan Island to ensure safety from the Native Americans and for the better management of their farming practices. The couple found success in New Amsterdam and eventually Joris purchased 335 acres in Wallabout Bay in Brooklyn.

Catalina and Joris had eleven children. Their daughter Sarah Rapelje (1625-c.1686) is described as the "first European Christian female child born in New Netherland," although this is disputed by some.

=== Deposition of Catilyn Trico ===
A document dated from 1688, in the New York State Archives, Trico, at age 82, describes the first settlements at Albany, Hartford and the Delaware; as well as, early exploration, settlement, and relations with Native Americans.
