= Gilles de Retz (horse) =

British-bred Thoroughbred racehorse

- Sire: Royal Charger
- Grandsire: Nearco
- Dam: Ma Soeur Anne
- Damsire: Majano
- Sex: Stallion
- Foaled: 1953
- Died: 1969 (aged 15–16)
- Country: United Kingdom
- Colour: Bay
- Breeder: Eveton Stud
- Owner: Anthony Samuel
- Trainer: Helen Johnson Houghton officially Charles Jerdein officially Peter Walwyn
- Record: 14:4-1-2

Major wins
- 2000 Guineas (1956); Coronation Stakes (1957)

Awards
- Timeform rating 132

Gilles de Retz (1953–1969) was a British Thoroughbred racehorse and sire best known for winning the classic 2000 Guineas in 1956. After winning twice from five starts as a two-year-old, the colt disappointed on his three-year-old debut before recording a 50/1 upset victory in the Guineas. Although the feat was not officially recognised at the time, Gilles de Retz's success made Helen Johnson Houghton the first woman to train the winner of a British classic. The colt failed to reproduce his best form in three subsequent efforts in 1956 and won once from four attempts as a four-year-old. He was retired to stud where he had little success as a sire of winners.

== Background ==
Gilles de Retz was a dark-coated bay horse with no white markings bred by his owner, Anthony Samuel at his Eveton Stud. His sire, Royal Charger was a successful sprinter and miler who was trained by Jack Jarvis to win the Queen Anne Stakes and the Ayr Gold Cup in 1946. He made a promising start to his stud career in Ireland and went on to greater success after being exported to the United States in 1953. Gilles de Retz was the first foal of Ma Soeur Anne, a French-bred mare who was a half sister to Bagheera, the winner of the Prix de Diane and the Grand Prix de Paris.

During his racing career, Gilles de Retz was officially trained by Charles Jerdein and then by Peter Walwyn at the Woodway stable near Blewbury in Berkshire but the truth was rather different. When Gordon Johnson Houghton died in 1952, the running of the Woodway stable was taken over by his widow Helen Johnson Houghton (the twin sister of the National Hunt trainer Fulke Walwyn). The Jockey Club, however, refused to issue training licences to women until 1966, and Helen Johnson Houghton was obliged to use a series of male assistants to hold the licence, while she continued to train the horses. Mrs Johnson Houghton's achievements were belatedly recognised by the Jockey Club when she was one of the first women to be elected as a member in 1977.

== Racing career ==
=== 1955: two-year-old season ===
Gilles de Retz began his racing career in the spring of 1955 when he finished third in a race at Salisbury Racecourse. He recorded his first success in the Watling Street Plate at Birmingham Racecourse and then moved up in class to win the Errol Stakes at Ascot Racecourse. Gilles de Retz returned to Ascot for the Royal meeting in July and finished second in the Chesham Stakes behind the filly Palariva. The colt was then rested until October when he ended his season by finishing fourth to Buisson Ardent in the Middle Park Stakes. In the Free Handicap, a rating of the season's best two-year-olds, Gilles de Retz was given a weight of 122 pounds, seven pounds below the top-rated colt Buisson Ardent, and eleven pounds behind the filly Star of India.

=== 1956: three-year-old season ===
Gilles de Retz prepared for the 2000 Guineas by finishing unplaced in the Greenham Stakes at Newbury Racecourse. Johnson Houghton felt that the horse had lacked fitness and altered his training programme: instead of traditional training gallops, in which he always performed lazily, the colt was brought to fitness by trotting up and down the hill between Blewbury village and the Woodway stable. Gilles de Retz was given little chance in the Guineas over Newmarket's Rowley Mile course and started at odds of 50/1 in a field of nineteen runners which appeared to be dominated by French and Irish challengers. The race attracted a huge crowd, including Queen Elizabeth II to Newmarket Heath for what was believed to be an unusually open contest. Ridden by Frank Barlow, he raced down the centre of the wide track, overtaking Drum Beat two furlongs from the finish and winning the classic by a length from Chantelsey, with Buisson Ardent in third place. In May, Gilles de Retz was moved up in distance for the Lingfield Derby Trial over one and a half miles. He moved very poorly on the way to the start and finished unplaced with Barlow virtually pulling the horse up in the straight as the race was won by Induna. A veterinary examination determined that the colt's lameness was caused by a "slipping stifle".

Despite his physical problems, Gilles de Retz contested the Derby at Epsom Downs Racecourse in June. He started a 28/1 outsider and made no impact, finishing unplaced behind the French-trained Lavandin. Later in the month he returned to the one mile distance for the St. James's Palace Stakes at Royal Ascot, but again ran poorly, finishing last of the six runners on his last appearance of the season.

=== 1957: four-year-old season ===
In 1957 the licence at Blewbury was passed from Charles Jerdein to Helen Johnson Houghton's twenty-three-year-old cousin, Peter Walwyn. Gilles de Retz began his third season at Sandown Park Racecourse where he contested the Coronation Stakes, a race now known as the Brigadier Gerard Stakes. Ridden by Barlow, the colt won easily at odds of 100/6, showing his best form for the first time in almost a year. He then finished fourth behind the French-trained five-year-old Fric in both the Coronation Cup and the Hardwicke Stakes and ended his career with a defeat in the Midsummer Stakes.

== Assessment and honours ==
As a three-year-old in 1956, Gilles de Retz was given a rating of 132 by the independent Timeform organisation, making him the equal top-rated three-year-old in Europe alongside the Prix du Jockey Club winner Philius. In their book, A Century of Champions, based on a modified version of the Timeform rating system, John Randall and Tony Morris were more sceptical, rating Gilles de Retz an "inferior" winner of the 2000 Guineas.

== Stud record ==
Gilles de Retz made little impact as a stallion in Europe and was exported to Japan in 1964. The best of his offspring was probably Chitose O, whose wins included the Satsuki Sho. Gilles de Retz died in Japan in 1969 at the age of seventeen.

== Pedigree ==
Pedigree of Gilles de Retz (GB), bay horse, 1953
Sire Royal Charger (GB) 1942	Nearco (ITY); 1935	Pharos	Phalaris
Sire Royal Charger (GB) 1942	Nearco (ITY); 1935	Pharos	Scapa Flow
Sire Royal Charger (GB) 1942	Nearco (ITY); 1935	Nogara	Havresac
Sire Royal Charger (GB) 1942	Nearco (ITY); 1935	Nogara	Catnip
Sire Royal Charger (GB) 1942	Sun Princess (GB); 1937	Solario	Gainsborough
Sire Royal Charger (GB) 1942	Sun Princess (GB); 1937	Solario	Sun Worship
Sire Royal Charger (GB) 1942	Sun Princess (GB); 1937	Mumtaz Begum	Blenheim
Sire Royal Charger (GB) 1942	Sun Princess (GB); 1937	Mumtaz Begum	Mumtaz Mahal
Dam Ma Soeur Anne (FR) 1947	Majano (FR); 1937	Deiri	Aethelstan
Dam Ma Soeur Anne (FR) 1947	Majano (FR); 1937	Deiri	Desra
Dam Ma Soeur Anne (FR) 1947	Majano (FR); 1937	Madgi Moto	Ksar
Dam Ma Soeur Anne (FR) 1947	Majano (FR); 1937	Madgi Moto	Groseille a Maquereau
Dam Ma Soeur Anne (FR) 1947	Grande Soeur (FR); 1930	Grand Guignol	Rabelais
Dam Ma Soeur Anne (FR) 1947	Grande Soeur (FR); 1930	Grand Guignol	Grignouse
Dam Ma Soeur Anne (FR) 1947	Grande Soeur (FR); 1930	Soeur Gaby	Gorgos
Dam Ma Soeur Anne (FR) 1947	Grande Soeur (FR); 1930	Soeur Gaby	Scammonnee (Family:5-g)
