= Ginny Dougary =

British interviewer and feature writer

Ginny Dougary (born 17 October 1956) is a British interviewer and feature writer for The Times. She is the author of The Executive Tart & Other Myths, and a contributor to several anthologies including OK, You Mugs and Amazonians - New Travel Writing by Women. She is a founding member of the national organisation of Women in Journalism, has written for most of the national newspapers in the United Kingdom.

Ginny Dougary was shortlisted as Interviewer of the Year in 2009 and 2010 for her interviews with Benazir Bhutto, Norman Tebbit, and Ian McKellen.

Dougary was involved in a copy-control controversy in 2017 regarding her interview for Saga magazine with the BBC TV presenter Clare Balding, when it was alleged that Balding or her agent rewrote part of the text, provoking Dougary to remove her byline from the piece. According to Dougary, Balding removed sections of the text and inserted promotional material about her new book, as well as details of her hosting of the women's European football championships and the words "And indeed she [Balding] sparkles all the way through the photo shoot," despite Dougary commenting that this was not the case and that Balding was rather "a brisk, jolly-hockey-sticks type". In a statement, Saga said that it had not given Balding copy control and that the interview was edited in conjunction with the author.
