= Helen Rollason =

British television presenter (1956–1999)

Helen Rollason MBE
- Rollason c. 1993
- Born: Helen Frances Grindley; 11 March 1956; London, England
- Died: 9 August 1999 (aged 43); Brentwood, Essex, England
- Cause of death: Colon cancer
- Occupations: Journalist; presenter; newsreader
- Years active: 1980–1999
- Notable credits: Grandstand; Newsround; BBC Six O'Clock News
- Spouse: John Rollason (m. 1980; div. 1991)
- Children: 1

Helen Frances Rollason MBE (née Grindley; 11 March 1956 – 9 August 1999) was a British sports journalist and television presenter, who in 1990 became the first female presenter of the BBC's sports programme Grandstand. She was also a regular presenter of Sport on Friday, and of the children's programme Newsround during the 1980s.

Born in London, Rollason studied to become a PE teacher before entering radio broadcasting in 1980. After directing sport related content for Channel 4, where she helped to bring American football to British television, she anchored coverage of the 1987 World Student Games and 1988 Summer Olympics for ITV. Her work on Grandstand proved popular with viewers, and led to a number of other sports presenting roles for Rollason throughout the 1990s. As well as covering mainstream events such as the 1996 Summer Olympics, she became a champion of disability sports, helping to raise its profile and change its public and media perception. She presented sports bulletins for BBC Breakfast News and BBC News, and in 1996 was named as Sports Presenter of the Year.

Rollason was diagnosed with colon cancer in 1997, and fought a two-year battle with the disease. A 1998 documentary, Hope for Helen, followed her treatment, and won her much public support for her courage. She continued to work throughout her illness, and shortly before her death was appointed an MBE in the 1999 Birthday Honours. Later that year, the BBC established an award in her memory which is presented at the annual BBC Sports Personality of the Year awards ceremony. A cancer charity was also founded in her name. Rollason's television career also helped to open up the way for other women to enter the world of sports broadcasting, with presenters such as Sue Barker and Gabby Logan following in her footsteps.

== Early life ==
Helen Grindley was born in London on 11 March 1956, and adopted at the age of nine months. Raised in a family where she was the second of three children, she spent her childhood in Northamptonshire and Bath. Her father was an engineer who later became a lecturer at Bath College, and her mother a biology teacher. She attended the Bath High School for Girls, and after developing an early interest in sport, was a member of Bath Athletics Club, as well as playing hockey for Somerset. Although she was keen to follow a career in broadcasting, careers advisors at school steered her towards teaching instead.

After leaving school she studied at the University of Brighton's Chelsea College of Physical Education in Eastbourne, where she became Vice-President of the Students Union. During her second year at the college she spent a term as an exchange student at Dalhousie University in Halifax, Nova Scotia. She graduated in 1977. After completing her studies she became a PE teacher, and spent three years teaching the subject to secondary school students. She worked initially at Henry Beaufort School in Winchester, Hampshire, before moving to Essex, where she was a supply teacher. It was while she was teaching PE that she met her future husband, a fellow teacher named John Rollason. The couple married in 1980; a daughter, Nikki, was born in 1983. The couple divorced in 1991.

== Broadcasting career ==
Rollason continued to aspire to a career in broadcasting, and while still teaching did screen tests for BBC Wales and BBC South, but she was unsuccessful in both auditions. In 1980, she took a holiday job as a volunteer presenter at Basildon Community Radio after seeing an advertisement in Basildon town centre and offering her services to them. A year later she joined the team of Essex Radio as a sports reporter when the commercial station began to broadcast. She was subsequently appointed as the station's deputy sports editor. Three years later, she became a producer-director for Cheerleader Productions, making sports content for Channel 4. Among the events for which she helped to provide coverage were the final of the 1984 Davis Cup, held in Sweden, and Super Bowl XIX, which took place in 1985. Additionally, she worked on the US Masters and US Open.

After just over a year with Cheerleader, Rollason left the company to concentrate on her broadcasting career, and became a freelance reporter. She covered the 1987 World Student Games from Zagreb for Thames Television, and then presented the 1988 World Junior Athletics championships from Sudbury, Ontario for Channel 4. Later, in 1988, she provided coverage of that year's Summer Olympics, held in Seoul, for ITV. During the mid-1980s, she also joined the presenting team of the BBC children's news programme, Newsround, with a view to increasing its sports coverage, and presented several features on topics such as gymnastics and female jockeys, as well as presenting Newsround Extra, a show that covered a specific issue in more detail. One such programme was a report on the street children of Bogotá, a subject that deeply moved her and reduced her to tears on screen.

In 1990, Rollason joined BBC Sport and became the first female presenter of Grandstand, where her down-to-earth presenting style quickly made her popular with viewers, and earned her a regular presenting role on BBC Two's Sport on Friday, as well as a raft of other sporting programmes. Among her credits with the BBC are coverage of the Wimbledon Championships, the 1992 Summer Olympics from Barcelona and 1996 Summer Olympics from Atlanta, together with the 1994 Commonwealth Games, which were held in Victoria, British Columbia. She was an advocate of disability sports, and helped to alter its public and media perception with her coverage of the 1996 Summer Paralympics. Britain's Olympic team had been fairly unsuccessful at that year's Olympics, prompting Rollason to urge viewers and the media to support what she called the "real" Olympics. Jane Swan, General Secretary of the British Paralympic Association, later described how Rollason's support for the event had helped to change its image. "Until then, the Paralympics had been treated as documentary material, focusing mainly on disability. Helen made people realise that it was sport." Other disability sporting events she covered include the 1990 World Disabled Championships, 1991 Blind Golfers' Championships, and the 1992 Summer Paralympics. She also fronted sports bulletins for BBC Breakfast News. In 1996, she was named as the Television and Radio Industries Sports Presenter of the Year.

== Later career, illness and death ==
Rollason began feeling unwell in 1996 during an eight-week assignment to the US, where she was covering that year's Olympic and Paralympic Games. She was diagnosed with cancer of the colon in August 1997, which she was told had also spread to her liver. She was initially given three months to live, but confounded medical opinion by fighting the disease long after that. She underwent treatment with chemotherapy, but also used a combination of holistic therapies and diet to treat her condition. The cancer later metastasised to her lungs. Rollason continued to work throughout her illness, despite sessions of chemotherapy that left her feeling weak, and cited her work as the thing that had kept her going throughout her treatment. "I stay working because I love it, and because I feel best on the days when I'm busy. I'd far rather work than hang around the house – even though there are days when I can hardly get out of bed." She presented sports bulletins for BBC News, wrote a weekly column about her illness for the Sunday Mirror Magazine and worked on a book about her experience that she hoped would help others diagnosed with the disease. She cited the determination of the many disabled athletes she had got to know through her work as having given her the strength of mind to fight her illness. In October 1998, the BBC aired a special edition of its QED documentary series titled Hope for Helen, which followed her as she underwent a course of treatment. The film earned her much support from the public for her courage. in December 1998, colleagues paid tribute to an emotional-looking Rollason during the BBC's Sports Review of the Year, a compliment that produced mixed feelings for the presenter. She later wrote of the incident, "I felt a mixture of horror, embarrassment and incredible warmth towards my colleagues that they should think of doing this".

In April 1999, the BBC announced plans to overhaul its Six O'Clock News bulletin, and that an in-depth sports preview fronted by Rollason would be included in the programme's Friday edition. She began presenting the slot in May, and made her last onscreen appearance on 18 June. Rollason was appointed an MBE in the 1999 Birthday Honours for her services to broadcasting and charities, and in July 1999 attended a ceremony at Buckingham Palace to be presented with the honour by the Queen. Speaking about the occasion, Rollason said, "I cried when I received the news. I don't feel I deserve it but I'm very thrilled that so many women are coming through in sport broadcasting now." Also in July, she received an honorary degree from the University of Brighton, which was presented to her at her home after she became too ill to attend the ceremony. Shortly before that she was honoured with an award for courage at the 1999 Pride of Britain Awards.

Rollason became involved in charity work, raising £5 million for a cancer wing at North Middlesex Hospital, which was named in her honour. She died on 9 August 1999 at the age of 43, in Brentwood, Essex. On 17 August, a service of thanksgiving was held for Rollason at a church near her home, and attended by friends and colleagues. Later that month, the BBC aired Helen Rollason: The Bravest Fight, a 30-minute documentary presented by Peter Sissons in which friends and colleagues paid tribute to her. Her autobiography, Life's Too Short, was published posthumously in 2000.

== Legacy ==
As the first female presenter of Grandstand, Helen Rollason was a pioneer of British sports broadcasting, an industry that was predominantly male at the time, and she established a precedent that allowed others to follow. Sue Barker, Hazel Irvine, Gail McKenna, Shelley Webb and Gabby Logan all followed in Rollason's footsteps to become noted UK sports presenters, with Logan joining ITV as their first female sports presenter in the late 1990s, where she co-hosted the football show On the Ball and was a contributor to The Premiership. Logan paid tribute to Rollason shortly after her death, saying she would be "an icon for young girls who want to go into that field because she showed what could be done. She was a great example to everyone."

On 4 November 1999, the BBC announced the establishment of a Helen Rollason Award, to be given at the BBC Sports Personality of the Year ceremony in recognition of "outstanding achievement in the face of adversity". Its first recipient was retired National Hunt trainer Jenny Pitman, who was herself diagnosed with cancer, and was presented with the award at that year's ceremony on 12 December. Other Helen Rollason Award recipients include yachtswoman Ellen MacArthur in 2001 for her courage in becoming the fastest woman to circumnavigate the globe, footballer Geoff Thomas in 2005 for raising in excess of £150,000 for the Leukaemia Research charity by cycling, following his own battle with the disease, and in 2014, the competitors of the inaugural Invictus Games, a multi-sport event for sick and injured service personnel, which made its debut that year. The 2016 award was presented to Ben Smith, who completed 401 marathons in 401 days in support of the anti bullying charities.

The Sunday Times created the Helen Rollason Award for Inspiration as part of their Sportswomen of the Year Awards. Jenny Pitman was its first recipient in 1999. Others to receive the award include student Joanna Gardiner in 2007 for her work with Football for Peace, a charity that provides football coaching to children from Jewish and Palestinian communities in Israel, Claire Lomas in 2012 who, having been paralysed following a riding accident completed that year's London Marathon with the aid of a robotic suit, and Mel Woodards in 2014, chair of the Somerset-based Milton Nomads junior football club who established a local football league for children.

The Helen Rollason Cancer Charity was established in her name in 1999. The charity funds and operates three cancer support centres – in Essex, Hertfordshire and London. Lord Coe, who had known Rollason since her days in radio broadcasting, is the charity's patron. The first Helen Rollason Cancer Care Centre was opened in Chelmsford, Essex in April 2002. in 2011, a new research centre named after Rollason and offering treatment for patients as part of clinical trials of new cancer therapies was opened at Chelmsford's Broomfield Hospital.

In April 2006, Brentwood Borough Council announced that a new housing development would include a road named Rollason Way in her memory. Additionally, eleven apartment blocks within the development would be named after people associated with Rollason or winners of the BBC Sports Personality of the Year. The building names on Rollason Way include Adlington House, Boardman Place, Radcliffe House, Christie Court, Redgrave Court, Botham House, Faldo Court, Whitbread Place, Torvill Court, and MacArthur Place.

== Publications ==
- Rollason, Helen (2000). Life's Too Short. Hodder & Stoughton. ISBN 978-0-34076-772-6.
