= Sarah Rapelje =

American colonist

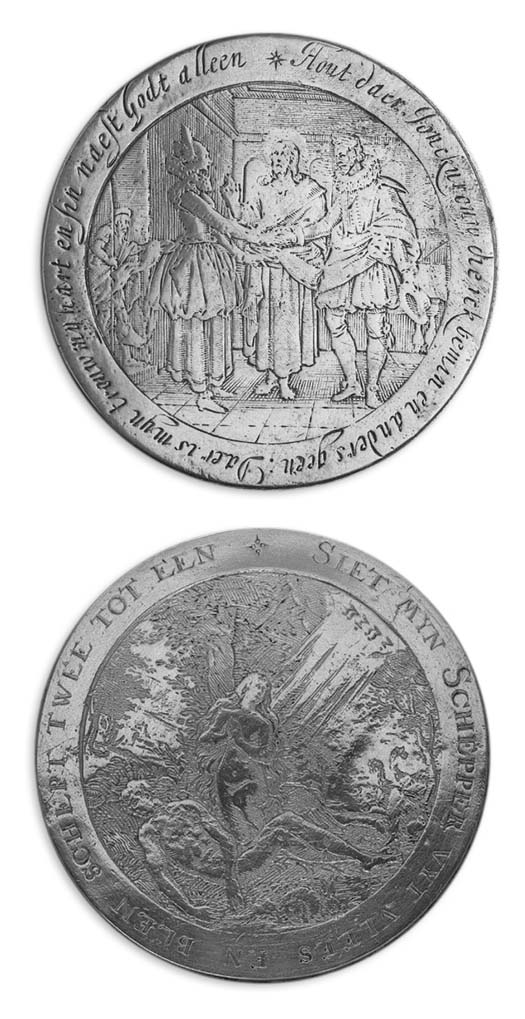
Medallion given to Sarah Rapelje on occasion of her marriage to Hans Hansen Bergen, 1639. Later inserted into tankard, donated by descendants to Brooklyn Museum of Art, 1926

Sarah Rapelje (9 June 1625 – April 1685) was the first European Christian female, the "first white child" born in New Netherland.

== Biography ==
Sarah Rapelje was of French origin, the daughter of Joris Jansen Rapelje (1604–1663) and Catalina Trico (1605–1689), who were Walloon Calvinists. They sailed on board the ship Eendracht from the Dutch Republic in 1624. The Rapeljes arrived at a site along the Hudson River where they helped build one of the first Dutch settlements, Fort Orange, where Sarah Rapelje was born on 9 June 1625, along the Waaleboght. Fort Orange would eventually become the fur-trading town of Beverwijck, which itself would later become Albany, New York.

In 1626, Manhattan Island near the mouth of the Hudson River was bought by Dutch settlers from local Native Americans, and the Rapelje family were sent to help with the settlement of New Amsterdam on the island's southern tip. Growing up she helped manage her family's tavern, contributing to her maturation.

Joris Rapelje later bought land on Long Island, across the East River from New Amsterdam, in the village of Breuckelen (the basis of modern Brooklyn) and eventually moved to Wallabout Bay.

Sarah Rapelje married Hans Hansen Bergen in 1639 at the age of 14, with whom she had eight children, seven of whom lived into adulthood. Bergen died in 1653. In 1654 Rapelje married Teunis Gysbertse Bogaert (b. 1625, Heicop, Dutch Republic – d. 1699, Breuckelen, New York) with whom she had seven more children. She had two sets of twins, and it is estimated she is the progenitor of over 1 million descendants in the modern era. She has been dubbed the "Mother of New York".

Rapelje died in 1685 in Boswijck, a village that became the modern Bushwick neighborhood of Brooklyn. By the time Rapelje died the New Netherland colony had been ceded to the English in 1664, and was rebranded the Province of New York.

== Legacy ==
Rapelje's chair is in the permanent collection of the Museum of the City of New York, a gift of her Brinckerhoff descendants. Brooklyn's Rapelye Street is named after the family. Sarah Rapelje herself was granted a large tract of land in the Wallabout in Brooklyn by Dutch authorities for being the first European Christian female to be born in the New Netherland. The family owned extensive property in the area of present-day Red Hook.

Her descendants include Humphrey Bogart, Johnny Carson, British television presenter Clare Balding, Al Fagaly, Tom Brokaw, Governor Howard Dean, Royal Baking Powder Company president Joseph C. Hoagland (1841–1899), Grammy-winning musician Mark O'Connor, and Florence Foster Jenkins.

== Related reading ==
- Bergen, Teunis G, (1866) The Bergen Family: or The Descendants of Hans Hansen Bergen, One of the Early Settlers of New York and Brooklyn (New York City: Bergen & Tripp)
- Fosdick, Lucian John (1906) The French Blood in America (Boston, Mass.: R. G. Badger)
- Ross, Peter (1902) A History of Long Island: From Its Earliest Settlement to the Present Time, Volume 2 (Lewis publishing Company - Long Island, N.Y.)
- Stiles, Henry Reed (1867) A History of the City of Brooklyn, Volume 1 (Published by subscription in Brooklyn, NY)
