= Hans Hansen Bergen =

Norwegian-American farmer

Hans Hansen Bergen (c. 1619– 30 May 1654) was one of the earliest settlers of the Dutch colony of New Amsterdam, and one of the few from Scandinavia. He was a native of Bergen, Norway. Hans Hansen Bergen was a shipwright who served as overseer of an early tobacco plantation on Manhattan Island, before eventually removing to Brooklyn's Wallabout Bay, where he was one of the earliest settlers and founded a prominent Brooklyn clan.

== Biography ==
Hans Hansen Bergen emigrated to New Netherland in 1633, at the age of 14, aboard the Dutch West India Company ship "de Zoutberg", in a company with the Director-General of New Netherland, Wouter Van Twiller. Bergen was initially known in early New Amsterdam records by various names, but chiefly Hans Hansen Noorman and Hans Hansen Boer. Originally living in New Amsterdam, he owned a lot on Pearl St.

Bergen, at the age of 20, was married to Sarah Rapelje in 1639, who was 14 at the time. She the first female child of European parentage born in the colony of New Netherland and whose chair is preserved in the collection of the Museum of the City of New York. They had eight children, including twins. Following Bergen's death in 1654, his widow remarried Teunis Gysbert Bogart.

Along with his father-in-law, Joris Jansen Rapelje, Bergen acquired and managed several pieces of property. In 1647, Bergen received a patent for 400 acres (1.6 km^{2}) in the Wallabout Bay area of present-day Brooklyn. Rapelje was a substantial property owner, as well as one of the Council of Twelve Men. Following his land grant, Hans Hansen Bergen moved to the area on western Long Island now located within the borough of Brooklyn, where he made his living as a farmer. Apparently illiterate, Bergen signed his name to official documents with a simple 'H'. Following Bergen's death, in 1662 two of his sons settled at what is today's Bedford, Brooklyn, near their Rapelje grandfather.

== Descendants ==
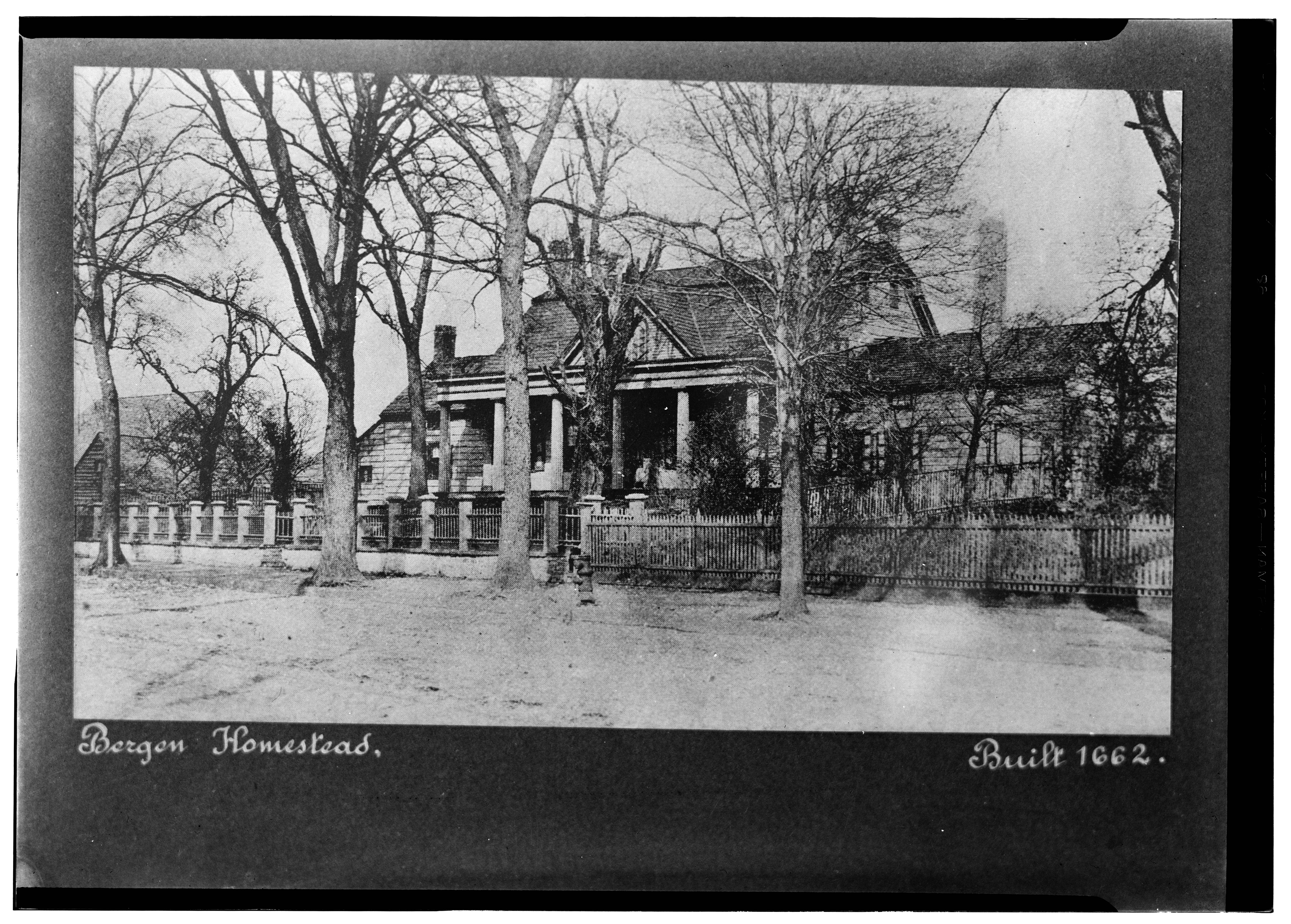
A Bergen homestead, built in 1662 in the Gowanus neighborhood of Brooklyn and owned by John C. Bergen, pictured here c. 1905.

The descendants of Hans Hansen Bergen continued to reside in Brooklyn and Kings County, New York for centuries, and owned extensive tracts of land across Brooklyn. The Sunset Park neighborhood was mostly owned by his descendants during the American Revolution. As late as the mid-19th century, Bergen family members grew up in Brooklyn speaking Dutch. Several family members – including John Teunis Bergen and Teunis Garret Bergen – represented the area in the United States Congress, as well as owning the forerunner of The Brooklyn Eagle newspaper.

Other descendants include John G. Bergen, the police commissioner of the New York City Police Department during the New York Draft Riots of 1863, and DeWitt Clinton, Mayor of New York City, Governor of New York State and United States Senator from New York. Bergen's descendants married into other early New Amsterdam families, including the Vanderbilts, the Voorhees, the Wyckoffs, the Cortelyous, the Denyses, the Suydams, the Vanderveers, and the Bensons, among others. Among Bergen's present-day descendants is the American political figure Howard Dean.

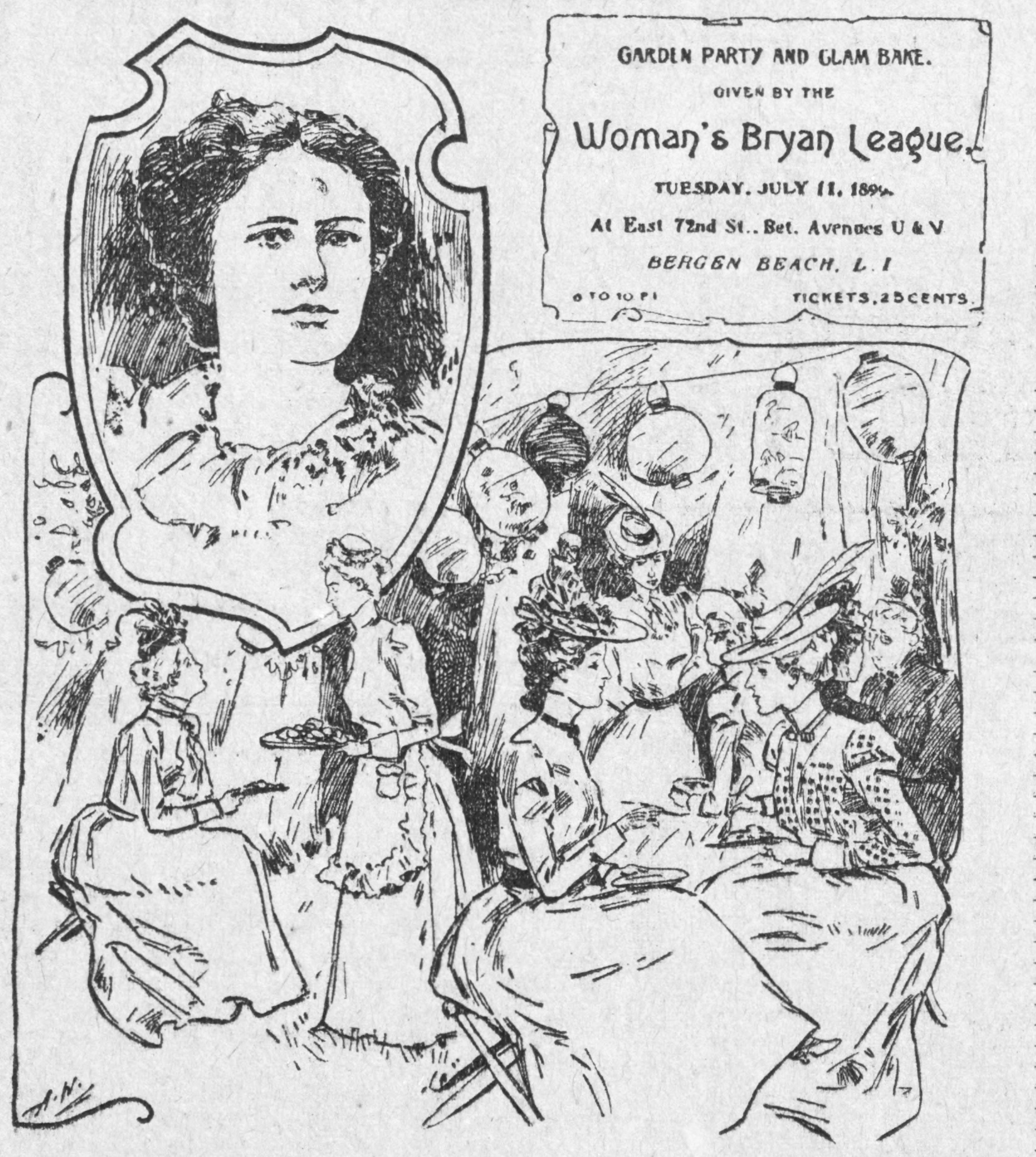
Women's Bryan League flyer from 1899 for fundraiser organized by Emelie C. Brewster at Bergen Beach for William Jennings Bryan

An early history of the family of Hans Hansen Bergen and his descendants was written by Teunis Garret Bergen in 1866.

While Hans himself, along with many descendants, did not own slaves, some of his descendants embraced the institution until it was banned by New York in 1827.

== Legacy ==
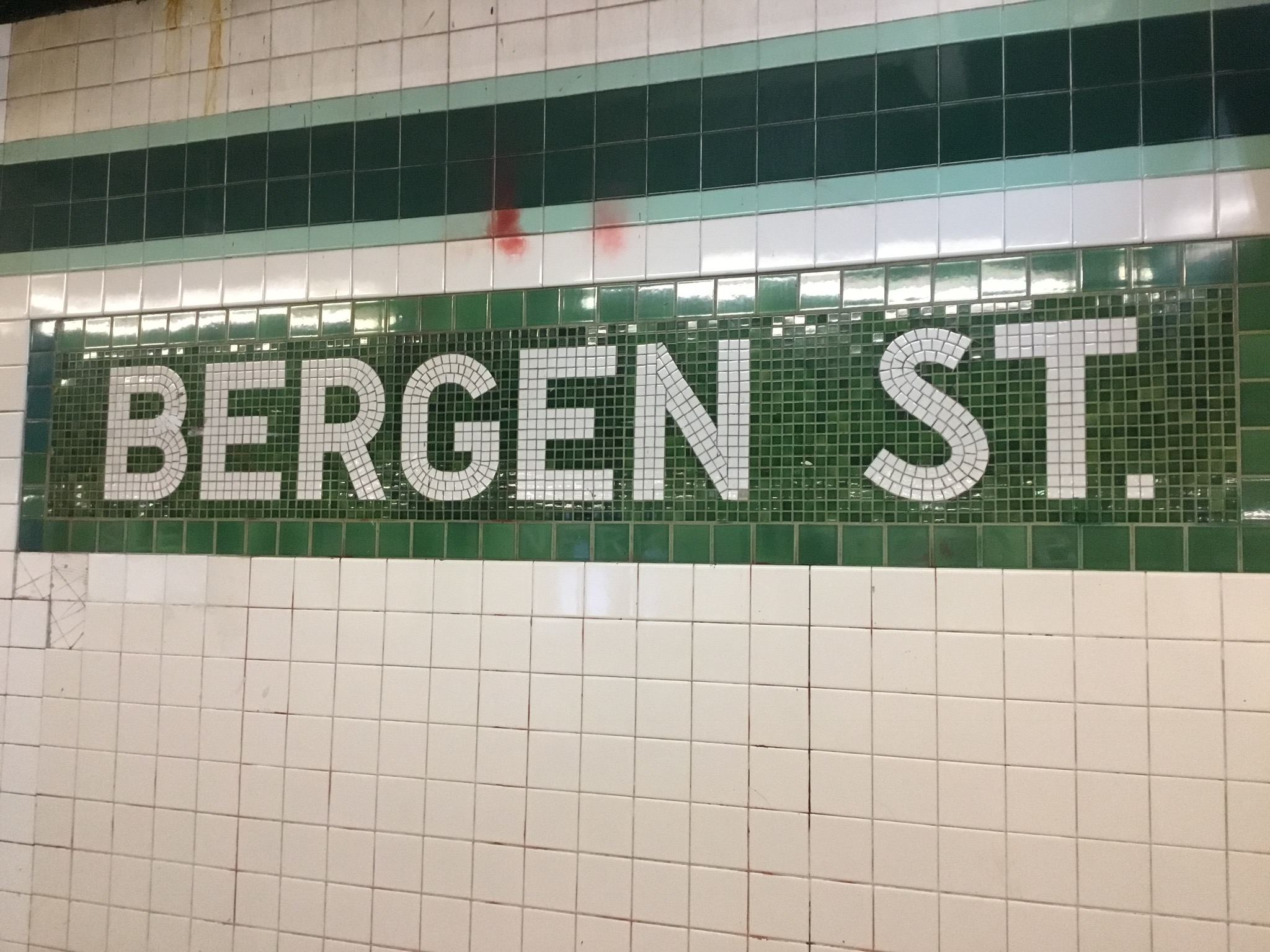
Mosaic tile for a Bergen Street Subway Station in Brooklyn

Bergen is a place name which today appears frequently in Brooklyn. The neighborhood of Bergen Beach carries Bergen's name as do Bergen Street in Brooklyn and the two New York City Subway stations located on Bergen Street at Smith Street and at Flatbush Avenue. Descendants of Hans Hansen Bergen owned the land that became Bergen Beach, which they subsequently sold to entrepreneur Percy Williams, who developed it into a summer resort. Some also believe that Bergen County, New Jersey as well as Bergen Township take their names from this early Norwegian settler, although the evidence is inconclusive.
