= Helen Rollason Cancer Charity =

British health charity

- Formation: 1999
- Founded: 1999
- Founder: Helen Rollason MBE & Professor Neville Davidson
- Type: Charity
- Registration no.: 3144906
- Purpose: Cancer support
- Headquarters: Essex
- Location: Chelmsford, Essex
- Origins: cancer care
- Region served: South-East England
- Product: Cancer support centres and a research programme
- Method: counselling, reflexology, aromatherapy, manual lymphatic drainage,
- Chief Executive Officer: Kate Alden
- Website: https://www.helenrollason.org.uk/
- Formerly called: Helen Rollason Heal Cancer Charity

The Helen Rollason Cancer Charity, located in the United Kingdom, is a charity which assists individuals affected by cancer. It was founded in 1999 and named after Helen Rollason MBE, who died of cancer at the age of 43.

== Cancer support ==
Founded in 1999, the charity was named after BBC broadcaster Helen Rollason. HRCC has four cancer support centres based in Chelmsford, Southend, Edmonton and Bishop's Stortford, as well as a cancer support hub at Braintree Community Hospital and GenesisCare Hospital in Springfield. The centres offer a range of complementary therapies to patients in an environment of peace and tranquillity, including counselling, reflexology, aromatherapy, manual lymphatic drainage and support groups.

== Shops ==
The charity has a network of nine shops run by volunteers in the Herts, Essex and London areas. They provide funding for the cancer support centres. The charity's shops are located in Burnham-on-Crouch, Chingford, Danbury, Ongar, Sawbridgeworth, South Woodham Ferrers, South Woodford, Wickford and Witham.
