= Peter Hastings-Bass =

British racehorse trainer (1920–1964)

Peter Robin Hood Hastings-Bass (16 July 1920 – 4 June 1964) was a British racehorse trainer.

Hastings-Bass was born Peter Hastings in 1920. His father was Aubrey Hastings (a son of the 14th Earl of Huntingdon), who trained three Grand National winners and was based at stables at Wroughton. He played minor counties cricket for Wiltshire in 1938, making two appearances in the Minor Counties Championship. He was educated at Oxford University where he represented the university at athletics and rugby union. He served with the Welsh Guards during World War II and after the war was assistant to his father's successor at the Wroughton stables, Ivor Anthony, from 1946 to 1952.

He purchased Kingsclere racing stables from Evan Williams and began training himself in 1953, concentrating on Flat racing. Between 1953 and his death in 1964 he trained 340 winners at Kingsclere. He added the name of Bass to his name by deed poll in 1954; his aunt's husband was Sir William Bass, 2nd Baronet, who died in 1952 and left his estate to Hastings.

Hastings-Bass died at the age of 43 in 1964. He married Priscilla Bullock, daughter of Sir Malcolm Bullock on 9 April 1947 in Liverpool Cathedral. She retained the name Priscilla Hastings after her husband changed his, and was elected as one of the first female members of the Jockey Club in 1977. They had a daughter, Emma (who married Hastings-Bass's successor as trainer at Kingsclere, Ian Balding, in 1969) and three sons, one of whom, William Hastings-Bass, 17th Earl of Huntingdon, was also a racehorse trainer and inherited the title of Earl of Huntingdon in 1990. Their second son, Simon, died in 2017, leaving the third son, John, as heir presumptive to the Earldom.

After his death, his estate became involved in a lawsuit with the Inland Revenue, which gave rise to what is known in the law of England and Wales as "the rule in Hastings-Bass", which allows the court to set aside mistaken trustee decisions which would not have been made had the true tax outcome been correctly understood.
