= Ruth Wood, Countess of Halifax =

British racehorse owner

Ruth Alice Hannah Mary Wood, Countess of Halifax (née Primrose, 18 April 1916 – 31 August 1989), was a British racehorse owner. She was one of the first three women to be elected as a member of the Jockey Club in December 1977, alongside her half-sister Priscilla Hastings and Helen Johnson Houghton.

She was the only child of Neil Primrose, son of the former Prime Minister Archibald Primrose, 5th Earl of Rosebery, and his wife, Lady Victoria Stanley, the third child of Edward Stanley, 17th Earl of Derby. Lady Victoria married Primrose on 7 April 1915, but he died in Palestine in 1917. His widow remarried in 1919 to Malcolm Bullock, who was a Conservative MP from 1923 to 1953 and who became a baronet in 1954. Ruth's half-sister Priscilla was born in 1920, but Lady Victoria Bullock was killed in an accident while hunting with the Quorn in 1927. She left her elder daughter a collection of paintings of racehorses by George Stubbs.

Ruth Primrose married Charles Wood in 1936 and became Countess of Halifax after the death of her father-in-law in 1959, when her husband inherited the earldom.

They had three children:

- Lady Caroline Victoria Wood (10 September 1937 – 15 November 2014), who married Joe Feilden, the eldest son of Major General Sir Randle Feilden in 1958; they later divorced and she remarried John Gosling in 1970
- Lady Susan Diana Wood (born 22 September 1938), who married Brigadier Ian Darsie Watson in 1959.
- Charles Edward Peter Neil Wood, 3rd Earl of Halifax (born 14 March 1944).

The countess and her husband won The Derby with Shirley Heights in 1978; the horse was jointly bred by the earl and his son.

Her husband, who died in 1980, was master of the Middleton Foxhounds for more than 30 seasons. They are buried together in the churchyard of All Saints, Kirby Underdale.
