= 1880 United States presidential election in New York =

- November 2, 1880
- Turnout: 89.3% ▼0.3 pp
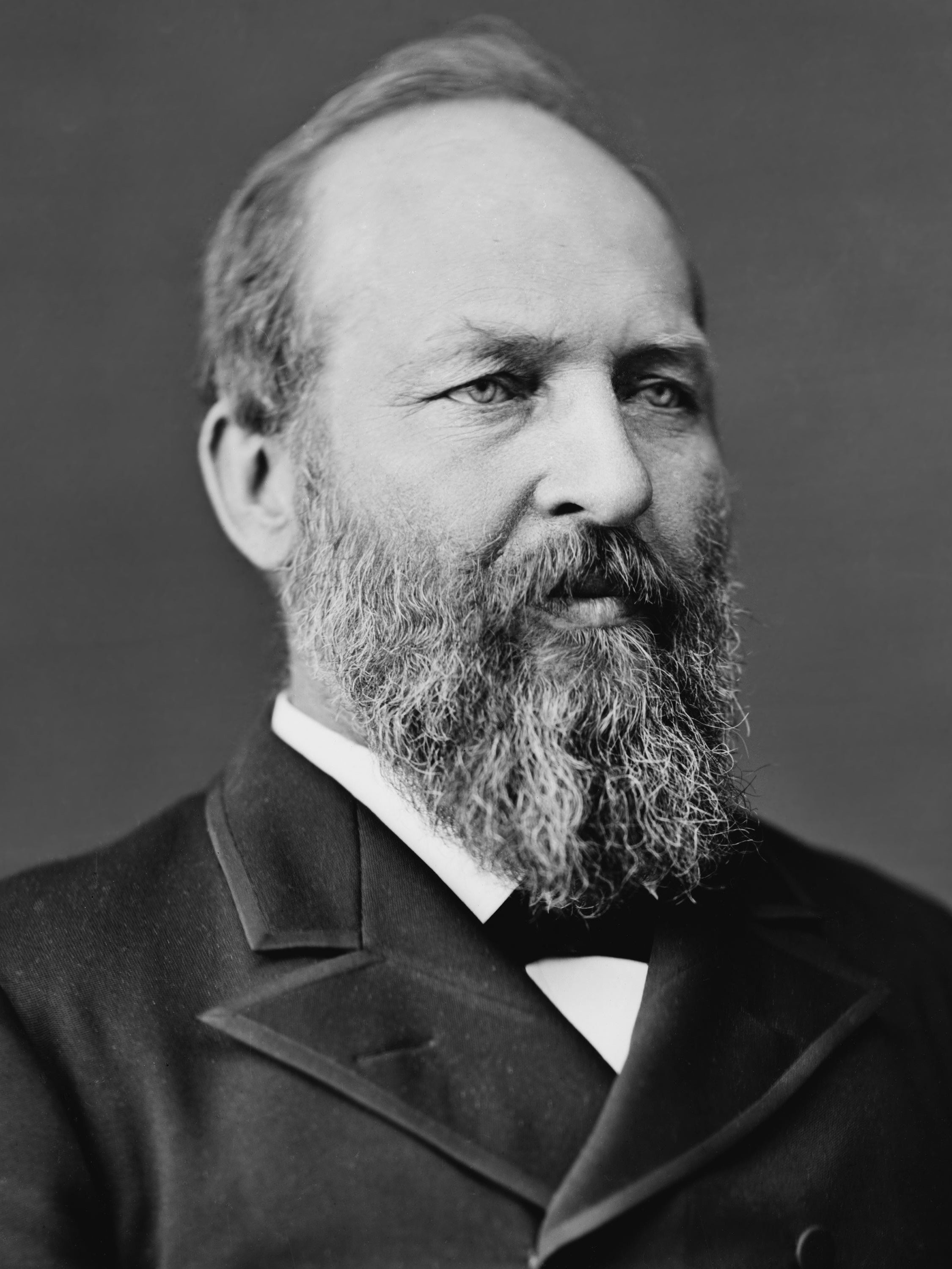

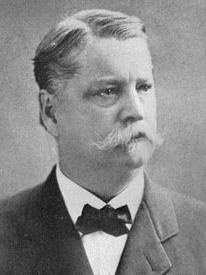
Nominee	James A. Garfield	Winfield Scott Hancock
Party	Republican	Democratic
Home state	Ohio	Pennsylvania
Running mate	Chester A. Arthur	William Hayden English
Electoral vote	35	0
Popular vote	555,544	534,511
Percentage	50.32%	48.42%
County results
Garfield
50–60%
60–70%
70–80%
Hancock
40–50%
50–60%
President before election
Rutherford B. Hayes
Republican
Elected President
James A. Garfield
Republican

The 1880 United States presidential election in New York took place on November 2, 1880. All contemporary 38 states were part of the 1880 United States presidential election. Voters chose 35 electors to the Electoral College, which selected the president and vice president.

New York was won by the Republican nominees, Congressman James A. Garfield of Ohio and his running mate former Collector of the Port of New York Chester A. Arthur of New York. Garfield and Arthur defeated the Democratic nominees, famed Civil War General Winfield Scott Hancock of Pennsylvania and his running mate former Congressman and banker William Hayden English of Indiana.

Garfield narrowly carried New York State with 50.32 percent of the vote to Hancock's 48.42 percent, a victory margin of 1.90 percent. In a distant third came the Greenback Party candidate James B. Weaver with 1.12 percent.

Had Hancock won New York, he would have won the presidency with 190 electoral votes.

New York weighed in for this election as less than 2 percentage points more Republican than the national average.

Hancock performed most strongly downstate in the New York City area, where he won New York County, Kings County, Queens County, and Richmond County. Hancock also won nearby Westchester County, and Rockland County. Garfield won much of upstate New York, including a victory in Erie County, home to the city of Buffalo, although Hancock did win Albany County, home to the state capital of Albany, along with several rural upstate counties.

== Results ==
1880 United States presidential election in New York
Party	Candidate	Running mate	Popular vote		Electoral vote	
Party	Candidate	Running mate	Count	%	Count	%
Republican	James A. Garfield of Ohio	Chester A. Arthur of New York	555,544	50.32%	35	100.00%
Democratic	Winfield Scott Hancock of Pennsylvania	William Hayden English of Indiana	534,511	48.42%	0	0.00%
Greenback	James B. Weaver of Iowa	Barzillai J. Chambers of Texas	12,373	1.12%	0	0.00%
Prohibition	Neal Dow of Maine	Henry Adams Thompson of Ohio	1,517	0.14%	0	0.00%
Total			1,103,945	100.00%	35	100.00%

=== Results by county ===
County	James A. Garfield Republican		Winfield Scott Hancock Democratic		James B. Weaver Greenback		Neal Dow Prohibition		Margin		Total votes cast
County	#	%	#	%	#	%	#	%	#	%	Total votes cast
Albany	16,564	45.33%	19,624	53.70%	354	0.97%	0	0.00%	-3,060	-8.37%	36,542
Allegany	6,827	63.18%	3,482	32.23%	486	4.50%	10	0.09%	3,345	30.96%	10,805
Broome	7,173	55.93%	5,450	42.49%	168	1.31%	35	0.27%	1,723	13.43%	12,826
Cattaraugus	7,401	54.49%	5,466	40.24%	672	4.95%	43	0.32%	1,935	14.25%	13,582
Cayuga	9,372	58.90%	5,976	37.56%	536	3.37%	28	0.18%	3,396	21.34%	15,912
Chautauqua	10,422	63.00%	5,472	33.08%	585	3.54%	64	0.39%	4,950	29.92%	16,543
Chemung	4,636	44.49%	4,806	46.12%	976	9.37%	3	0.03%	-170	-1.63%	10,421
Chenango	5,769	52.24%	4,559	41.28%	623	5.64%	92	0.83%	1,210	10.96%	11,043
Clinton	6,080	58.44%	4,250	40.85%	74	0.71%	0	0.00%	1,830	17.59%	10,404
Columbia	6,486	51.90%	5,992	47.95%	19	0.15%	0	0.00%	494	3.95%	12,497
Cortland	4,124	59.22%	2,749	39.47%	78	1.12%	13	0.19%	1,375	19.74%	6,964
Delaware	6,058	53.18%	5,084	44.63%	218	1.91%	32	0.28%	974	8.55%	11,392
Dutchess	11,045	56.23%	8,475	43.15%	26	0.13%	95	0.48%	2,570	13.08%	19,641
Erie	24,199	53.20%	20,848	45.83%	442	0.97%	0	0.00%	3,351	7.37%	45,489
Essex	4,776	61.86%	2,775	35.94%	169	2.19%	1	0.01%	2,001	25.92%	7,721
Franklin	4,185	59.09%	2,799	39.52%	96	1.36%	3	0.04%	1,386	19.57%	7,083
Fulton	4,579	57.92%	3,327	42.08%	0	0.00%	0	0.00%	1,252	15.84%	7,906
Genesee	4,815	57.51%	3,481	41.57%	72	0.86%	5	0.06%	1,334	15.93%	8,373
Greene	3,879	45.67%	4,405	51.87%	175	2.06%	34	0.40%	-526	-6.19%	8,493
Hamilton	406	39.84%	552	54.17%	35	3.43%	26	2.55%	-146	-14.33%	1,019
Herkimer	6,331	54.90%	5,070	43.97%	61	0.53%	69	0.60%	1,261	10.94%	11,531
Jefferson	9,439	56.51%	7,216	43.20%	31	0.19%	18	0.11%	2,223	13.31%	16,704
Kings	51,751	45.66%	61,062	53.88%	507	0.45%	9	0.01%	-9,311	-8.22%	113,329
Lewis	4,036	52.26%	3,674	47.57%	11	0.14%	2	0.03%	362	4.69%	7,723
Livingston	5,522	55.53%	4,242	42.65%	161	1.62%	20	0.20%	1,280	12.87%	9,945
Madison	6,793	57.97%	4,683	39.96%	182	1.55%	60	0.51%	2,110	18.01%	11,718
Monroe	17,102	54.87%	13,742	44.09%	316	1.01%	11	0.04%	3,360	10.78%	31,171
Montgomery	5,230	51.21%	4,947	48.44%	32	0.31%	3	0.03%	283	2.77%	10,212
New York	81,730	39.79%	123,015	59.90%	610	0.30%	26	0.01%	-41,285	-20.10%	205,381
Niagara	6,478	51.75%	5,937	47.42%	56	0.45%	48	0.38%	541	4.32%	12,519
Oneida	14,546	52.82%	12,600	45.75%	273	0.99%	120	0.44%	1,946	7.07%	27,539
Onondaga	16,153	57.54%	11,732	41.79%	138	0.49%	49	0.17%	4,421	15.75%	28,072
Ontario	6,774	53.34%	5,767	45.41%	134	1.06%	25	0.20%	1,007	7.93%	12,700
Orange	10,088	50.63%	9,672	48.54%	116	0.58%	50	0.25%	416	2.09%	19,926
Orleans	4,581	58.90%	3,104	39.91%	75	0.96%	18	0.23%	1,477	18.99%	7,778
Oswego	10,236	58.53%	6,746	38.58%	444	2.54%	61	0.35%	3,490	19.96%	17,487
Otsego	7,156	49.10%	7,184	49.29%	127	0.87%	108	0.74%	-28	-0.19%	14,575
Putnam	2,114	55.28%	1,708	44.67%	0	0.00%	2	0.05%	406	10.62%	3,824
Queens	8,151	43.73%	10,391	55.74%	86	0.46%	13	0.07%	-2,240	-12.02%	18,641
Rensselaer	13,672	50.56%	13,031	48.19%	318	1.18%	22	0.08%	641	2.37%	27,043
Richmond	3,291	40.55%	4,815	59.33%	10	0.12%	0	0.00%	-1,524	-18.78%	8,116
Rockland	2,688	43.96%	3,415	55.86%	2	0.03%	9	0.15%	-727	-11.89%	6,114
Saratoga	8,116	58.00%	5,808	41.51%	49	0.35%	19	0.14%	2,308	16.50%	13,992
Schenectady	3,250	54.57%	2,628	44.12%	73	1.23%	5	0.08%	622	10.44%	5,956
Schoharie	3,646	40.66%	5,262	58.68%	35	0.39%	24	0.27%	-1,616	-18.02%	8,967
Schuyler	2,790	53.35%	2,293	43.84%	112	2.14%	35	0.67%	497	9.50%	5,230
Seneca	3,394	46.86%	3,802	52.49%	45	0.62%	2	0.03%	-408	-5.63%	7,243
St. Lawrence	13,748	70.08%	5,835	29.74%	16	0.08%	18	0.09%	7,913	40.34%	19,617
Steuben	10,245	51.68%	8,992	45.36%	584	2.95%	4	0.02%	1,253	6.32%	19,825
Suffolk	6,515	51.54%	6,061	47.95%	49	0.39%	15	0.12%	454	3.59%	12,640
Sullivan	3,339	44.57%	3,718	49.63%	434	5.79%	0	0.00%	-379	-5.06%	7,491
Tioga	4,750	55.14%	3,627	42.11%	189	2.19%	48	0.56%	1,123	13.04%	8,614
Tompkins	4,896	53.03%	3,956	42.85%	363	3.93%	17	0.18%	940	10.18%	9,232
Ulster	9,994	50.16%	9,870	49.53%	30	0.15%	32	0.16%	124	0.62%	19,926
Warren	3,330	52.57%	2,618	41.33%	379	5.98%	7	0.11%	712	11.24%	6,334
Washington	7,779	64.90%	4,145	34.58%	59	0.49%	3	0.03%	3,634	30.32%	11,986
Wayne	7,600	58.18%	5,207	39.86%	225	1.72%	30	0.23%	2,393	18.32%	13,062
Westchester	11,367	48.75%	11,858	50.86%	82	0.35%	8	0.03%	-491	-2.11%	23,315
Wyoming	4,695	58.17%	3,309	41.00%	58	0.72%	9	0.11%	1,386	17.17%	8,071
Yates	3,432	59.79%	2,197	38.28%	97	1.69%	14	0.24%	1,235	21.52%	5,740
Totals	555,544	50.32%	534,511	48.42%	12,373	1.12%	1,517	0.14%	21,033	1.91%	1,103,945

==== Counties that flipped from Democratic to Republican ====
- Columbia
- Lewis
- Montgomery
- Niagara
- Orange
- Rensselaer
- Schenectady
- Suffolk
- Ulster

== See also ==
- United States presidential elections in New York
- Presidency of James A. Garfield
- Presidency of Chester A. Arthur
