= Helen Johnson Houghton =

British racehorse trainer

Helen Marjorie Johnson Houghton (née Walwyn; 8 November 1910 – 4 December 2012) was a British racehorse trainer. She was the first woman to train a Classic flat races winner. Her horse Gilles de Retz won the 2,000 Guineas in 1956, but her name did not appear in the record books as the Jockey Club did not recognise women trainers at that time and the horse ran under the name of her assistant, Charles Jerdein, instead. She was one of the first three women to be elected as a member of the Jockey Club in December 1977, alongside Priscilla Hastings and Ruth Wood (née Primrose), Countess of Halifax.

== Early life ==
She was born in Wrexham, the twin sister of Fulke Walwyn, later also a horse trainer. Her father, Colonel Fulke Walwyn, was an officer in the Royal Welch Fusiliers, and Master of the Monmouth Hounds from 1922 to 1931. Her mother died when Helen and Fulke were still young. She was educated at home. After her father married one of their governesses, she lived with an aunt in Cheshire. Their cousin Peter Walwyn was also a racehorse trainer.

She married Gordon Johnson Houghton in 1937.

== Training career ==
Alongside her husband, she trained horses in Cheshire. Her husband served with the Cheshire Yeomanry in the Second World War. The couple bought the Woodway stable near Blewbury from trainer Francis Cobb in 1945, and moved to Berkshire (now Oxfordshire).

She took over the running of the Woodway stable after her husband was killed in a hunting accident in 1952. The Jockey Club refused to issue training licences to women until Florence Nagle won a court case in 1966, and so the licence was held by a series of male assistants. While she continued to train the horses, the licence was officially held by Colonel Dick Poole, then Charles Jerdein, then her cousin Peter Walwyn, before her son Fulke Johnson Houghton took over in 1961. Her achievements were belatedly recognised by the Jockey Club in December 1977, when she was one of the first three women to be elected as a member, alongside Priscilla Hastings and Ruth Wood (née Primrose), Countess of Halifax.

Her horse Gilles de Retz won the 2,000 Guineas in 1956 under Charles Jerdein's name, at odds of 50–1.

Other successful horses included

- Ribocco, who won the Irish Derby Stakes and St. Leger Stakes in 1967, and Ribero, who did the same in 1968
- Habitat, who the Lockinge Stakes and the Wills Mile in England and then the Prix Quincey and the Prix du Moulin in France in 1969
- Rose Bowl, who won the Queen Elizabeth II Stakes in 1975 and 1976
- Ile de Bourbon, who won the King George VI and Queen Elizabeth Stakes in July 1978
- Double Form, who won the Temple Stakes, King's Stand Stakes and Haydock Sprint Cup in England and the Prix de l'Abbaye in France in 1979

The licence has been held by her granddaughter Eve Johnson Houghton since January 2007.

Helen Johnson Houghton's achievements were belatedly recognised by the Jockey Club when she was one of the first women to be elected as a member in 1977.

She was survived by her son and daughter.
