= TheGenealogist =

- Company type: Limited Company
- Industry: Genealogy, online publishing
- Founded: January 2006
- Headquarters: Jersey, Channel Islands
- Key people: Nigel Bayley, Susan Bayley, Mark Bayley
- Owner: Genealogy Supplies (Jersey) Ltd
- Website: thegenealogist.co.uk

TheGenealogist is a family history website that provides subscriptions for researchers to help search genealogy records in the United Kingdom. The site is run by Genealogy Supplies (Jersey) Ltd which is part of the S&N Group. Among its accomplishments, the company has completely transcribed the England and Wales censuses from 1841 to 1911 inclusive. The site has been identified as among "the most prominent" subscription-based genealogy websites.

== History ==
=== TheGenealogist.co.uk ===
TheGenealogist started with the need to provide census indexes in 2002 and an initial volunteer project of indexing the 1891 census called UK Indexer.

The volunteer project at www.ukindexer.co.uk proved very popular and was a rewarding hobby for family historians to help provide quality, accurate data that was used on TheGenealogist.

As the project continued, the need became apparent to offer a full range of transcribed records of all the census on a commercial basis and Susan and Nigel Bayley formed Genealogy Supplies (Jersey) Ltd in 2006.

=== Genealogy Supplies (Jersey) Ltd ===
Genealogy Supplies (Jersey) Ltd was formed by Susan and Nigel Bayley, founders of S&N Genealogy Supplies with the aim of turning TheGenealogist into a leading family history website. Nigel Bayley is an author of many articles in the field of genealogy and has published the book Computer Aided Genealogy. The company established scanning and transcription services from their base in Jersey focussing on the Census for England and Wales and civil registration records. They went on to work with various archives and family history societies to build a unique collection of records.

Gradually more databases and other records have were added to the website, giving access to all the available Census records for England and Wales from 1841 to 1911 and the indexes to civil registration.

TheGenealogist runs many digitisation projects, which in the past have included the PCC (Prerogative Court of Canterbury) Wills and NonConformist records collections from The National Archives.

=== Major collections ===
The major collections include:

- Complete Birth, Marriage and Death Indexes between 1837 and 2005 (England and Wales)
- Complete Census between 1841 and 1911 (England and Wales), with some earlier indexes
- The 1939 Register
- Parish records
- Non-Conformist and Non-Parochial records
- Wills
- Military Records, Roll of Honour records being released on CD in July 2004 and War Memorial Records database (WW2 air force Operational Record Books (ORBs), archive series AIR 27, have been available since Feb 2020.)
- Occupational Records
- Newspapers & Magazines including The Illustrated London News
- Directories
- International Records

=== Census Records ===
TheGenealogist has comprehensive access to all the available Census records for England and Wales from 1841 to 1911. In 2012, Genealogy Supplies (Jersey) Ltd gained a license to publish the 1911 England and Wales Census, which was added to the site in May.

== Features ==
There are currently a wide variety of census, birth, marriage and death records, will records, directories and other records available on TheGenealogist. There is a range of payment or subscription options giving access to varying levels of data as part of a subscription service. TheGenealogist provides record searches by a person, a family or by an address. There is also the facility to build a family tree online.

It is possible to search the censuses, as well as the 1939 register, and for this to be viewed via the MapExplorer™ tool.

TheGenealogist has a number of different family trees available to view in its articles section which includes those of celebrities featured on the well known BBC TV programme Who Do You Think You Are?, such as Hugh Quarshie, Emilia Fox, Patrick Stewart and Len Goodman.
