= McFarlane House =

McFarlane House may refer to:

In the United States; alphabetical by state, then city:

- McFarlane House (Central City, Colorado), previously owned by Justin W. Brierly
- Tears–McFarlane House, Denver, Colorado, listed on the US National Register of Historic Places
- McFarlane-Wareham House, Manhattan, Kansas, NRHP-listed in Riley County, Kansas
- McFarlane House (Stevensville, Montana), NRHP-listed in Ravalli County, Montana
- McFarlane–Bredt House, Staten Island, New York, NRHP-listed
- Andrew and Jennie McFarlane House, North Huntingdon, Pennsylvania, NRHP-listed
