= William Ziegler Jr. =

American businessman

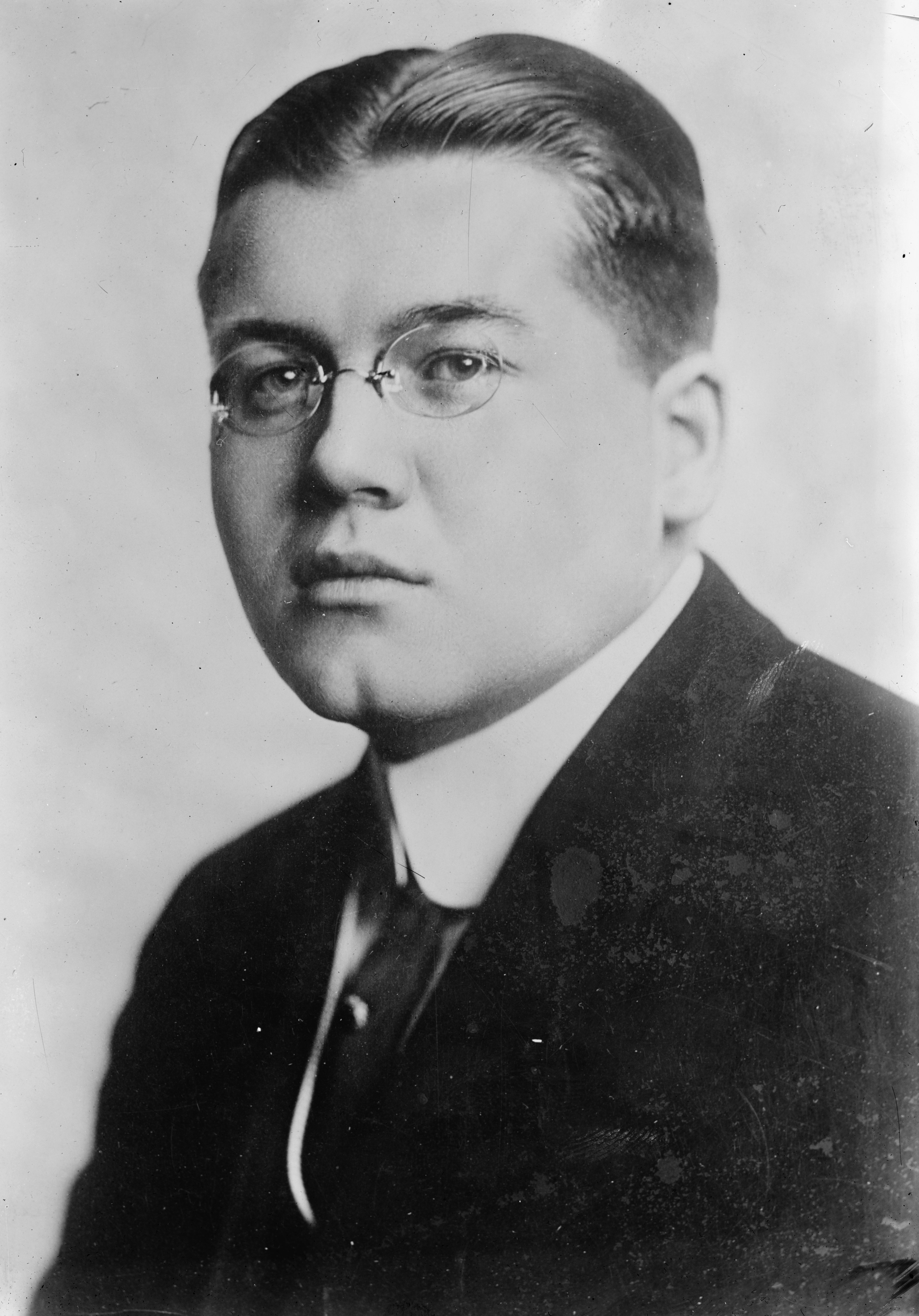
- Born: William Conrad Brandt; July 21, 1891; Muscatine, Iowa; United States
- Died: March 13, 1958 (aged 66); Connecticut Long Island Sound in front of Hay Island, Darien; United States death cause = Drowning, Murdered by his 2 personal Bodyguards
- Resting place: Woodlawn Cemetery, The Bronx, New York
- Education: Columbia University, Harvard University
- Occupations: Business CEO, Racehorse owner and breeder, Philanthropist
- Board member of: Royal Baking Powder Co., American Maize-Products
- Spouse(s): Gladys Virginia Watson (1912–1926); Helen B. Murphy (1927-1957)
- Children: Helen Ziegler Steinkraus (1927–2012)

William J. Ziegler Jr. (July 21, 1891 – March 3, 1958) was an American business executive, philanthropist, polo player, yachtsman, and a Thoroughbred racehorse owner and breeder.

Born William Conrad Brandt in Muscatine, Iowa to the half-brother of William Ziegler who adopted the boy at age 5 and renamed him William Ziegler Jr. While studying at Wadham College, Oxford as a 1910 Rhodes Scholar, he was a non-starting participant at the hammer throw and shot put events at the 1912 Summer Olympics.

He graduated from Columbia University and then Harvard University. Inheriting over half of his father's $30 million estate when his father died, he was then president of Royal Baking Powder Company until it merged into Standard Brands in 1929. He was also chairman on many boards: American Maize-Products, Huttig Manufacturing (sash and door company of Muscatine, Iowa), Southworth Management, Realty Administration Corp. He was also president of the Great Island Holding Company and Park Avenue Operating Company (which was an acquisition vehicle for the 55th Street mansion property).

After his mother, Matilda, died, he took over her Matilda Ziegler Magazine for the Blind publishing, American Foundation for the Blind, and other charities.

He was listed as living at his home on Great Island, Noroton, Connecticut in 1917, when he was treated for appendicitis.

He married his first wife, Gladys in 1912, then lived in the William Ziegler House, a New York City mansion at 2 East 63rd Street they had designed by Frederick Sterner in 1919. It still exists.

He and his second wife, Helen Martin Murphy (married 1927), lived in the William and Helen Ziegler House on 55th Street, which he had designed by William Lawrence Bottomley and was built in 1926–1927. It still exists.

== Thoroughbred racing ==
A successful owner and breeder, among William Ziegler Jr. successful horses, he owned El Chico, the 1938 American Champion Two-Year-Old Male Horse, and Esposa who was the American Champion Older Female Horse of both 1937 and 1938. Another of his runners, Bounding Home, won the 1944 Belmont Stakes, the third leg of the U.S. Triple Crown series.

Ziegler Jr. purchased the Burrland Farm facility in Middleburg, Virginia in 1926 for $70,000. He then had Bottomley design and build a mansion on it by 1927. He attempted to sell Burrland in 1938, but it didn't sell until Eleonora Sears purchased it in 1955.

On his death in 1958 at the 55th Street mansion, Helen Keller wrote a tribute about him in the New York Times. Keller called his death an "irreparable loss" to the American Foundation for the Blind.
