= American Red Cross Institute for the Blind =

Also known as Evergreen

Coordinates: 39°18′00″N 76°36′57″W

Red Cross Institute for the Blind (also known as Evergreen) was established by the American Red Cross in 1917. It was located in Baltimore, Maryland. The institute furnished the connecting link between the military and civil life of the injured men.

== History ==
The Red Cross Institute for the Blind was organized at the request of the Surgeon General of the United States to cooperate with the authorities at Hospital No. 7 and the Federal Board for Vocational Education in order to do anything that would help make the life of the soldiers and sailors better and more effective while at Evergreen and also after their discharge. The institute was housed in a building upon property adjacent to the Garrett estate. A library or club room was created soon after the opening of the institute where the men could read or be read to and get away from the routine of the military and school life. In order to provide the men with raised print copies of then current magazines, volunteer Braille copyists were trained and organized. Volunteer assistant teachers were provided training by the institution. Another need was for adequate provision for the housing of the relatives of the blind men when they come to Baltimore to visit their recuperating family members. Houses were furnished and equipped for this purpose by the institute at 915 N. Charles Street, for any member of a soldier's or sailor's family without any expense to the family member.

The property upon which the headquarters of the institute is situated adjoins "Evergreen" (General Hospital N. 7, as the American St. Dunstan's is officially known) — where war-blinded American soldiers, sailors and marines were trained under military supervision. Lieut.-Colonel James Bordley, Director of the work for the blind of the Army and Navy, was also Director of the Red Cross Institute for the Blind. The institute organized a Woman's Auxiliary with Mrs. Charles E. Rieman of Baltimore as chairman, to coordinate volunteer service. The first efforts of the ladies was in connection with the school and social life of the blind men at Evergreen. The institute also created an Industrial Survey Commission with Charles F. F. Campbell as chairman, which was actively engaged in collecting information relative to the employment of the blind in factories. The Director of Vocational Education at Evergreen was Supt. O. H. Burritt of the Pennsylvania Institution for the Blind.

== Notable people ==
The Committee of Direction of the Red Cross Institute for the Blind was composed of five members, each appointed by the General Manager of the American Red Cross.

- H. R. Fardwell, Director of Military Relief of the American Red Cross, Washington, D. C, was chairman of the committee.
- Dr. James Bordley, the Baltimore member of the committee, was, during the war, a Lieut. Colonel on the staff of the Surgeon General, and was directed to prepare and present a plan for the re-education of the blind soldiers. He was the Surgeon General's representative at General Hospital No. 7, to which the blind soldiers were sent, and Director of the Red Cross Institute for the Blind, which was opened in March, 1918, to supplement the work of the army. He continued in this capacity until the military authorities withdrew and the American Red Cross took over the management of the school in May, 1919, at which time, Lieut. Colonel Bordley returned to civilian life.
- Dr. George E. de Schweinitz, of Philadelphia, a professor of ophthalmology, University of Pennsylvania, was also a Lieut. Colonel on the staff of the Surgeon General's office. In June, 1919, de Schweinitz was asked to serve as a member of the Committee on Direction. de Schweinitz's long service on the board of managers of the Pennsylvania Institution for the Blind gave him a first hand knowledge of educational matters connected with the blind.
- Walter G. Holmes, of New York City, was the manager of the Matilda Zeigler Magazine for the Blind, the publication which was sent free of expense to blind readers throughout the United States and Canada since 1907 as a result of the generosity of Electa Matilda Ziegler. Holmes, through his editorship of this publication, had been in touch with a larger number of blind individuals than any other worker for the blind in the United States. This experience gave him an intimate acquaintance with all matters pertaining to the blind.
- M. C. Migel, of New York, was known to workers for the blind throughout the English speaking world, because of his generous assistance in financing the Uniform Type Commission for the Blind which solved the "Type Question" in the United States. He was Chairman of the New York State Commission for the Blind.
- L. W. Wallace, the Director of the institute, was ex-officio a member of the committee. For eleven years, Wallace was a member of the Faculty of Purdue University. For a number of years, he was head of the Department of Railway and Industrial Management. For some time, Wallace was Assistant General Manager of the Diamond Chain and Manufacturing Company of Indianapolis, which position he left to come to the Red Cross Institute for the Blind.

== Bibliography ==
- Massachusetts Association for Promoting the Interests of the Blind (1918). Outlook for the Blind. Vol. 12–13 (Public domain ed.). Massachusetts Association for Promoting the Interests of the Blind.
- Massachusetts Association for Promoting the Interests of the Blind (1920). "Evergreen Review". Outlook for the Blind. Vol. 1 (Public domain ed.). Massachusetts Association for Promoting the Interests of the Blind.
