= Colorado Poetry Fellowship =

The Colorado Poetry Fellowship was incorporated in 1934 with the purpose of "encouraging the development and recognition of the poets of our own region [and] sponsoring programs by distinguished guest poets and critics." Also integral to the purpose of the group was their participation in International Poetry Week, for which they organized programs and events. Formed in the spirit of the women's clubs which were so prevalent in American culture at the time, the leadership and membership of the group was primarily female. Nonetheless, men were welcomed into the group, and Levette J. Davidson, professor of English at the University of Denver, was on the Board of the group. Ida Kruse McFarlane, another well-known University of Denver faculty member, served as an advisor to the Board in its early years.

By 1938 the Fellowship had nearly 380 members. They held quarterly meetings, at which they listened to local poets present their work. They also organized lecture-recitals, which featured nationally known poets. Among those that the Fellowship brought to Denver were May Sarton, Langston Hughes, Don Blanding, Robert Frost, Haniel Long and William Rose Benét. The Fellowship also published a periodic poetry magazine, Timberlines. The magazine featured regional poets, listings of poetry events, and listings and reviews of new poetry books. Timberlines was published from 1938 to 1964, when the Fellowship disbanded.
