= Bounding Home =

American Thoroughbred racehorse

- Sire: Espino
- Grandsire: Negofol
- Dam: Marching Home
- Damsire: John P. Grier
- Sex: Stallion
- Foaled: 1941
- Country: United States
- Color: Dark Bay/Brown
- Breeder: William Ziegler Jr.
- Owner: William Ziegler Jr.
- Trainer: Matt Brady
- Record: 59: 8-9-12
- Earnings: $110,380

Major wins
- Pocantico Handicap (1946) American Classic Race wins: Belmont Stakes (1944)
- Last updated on August 24, 2020

Bounding Home (1941 – February 23, 1947) was an American Thoroughbred racehorse best known as the upset winner of the 1944 Belmont Stakes that deprived Pensive of the U.S. Triple Crown.

== Career ==
Bred by foodstuffs manufacturer William Ziegler Jr. at his Hickory Tree Stable in Middleburg, Virginia, Bounding Home was conditioned for racing by Matt Brady. At age three he had his best year in racing, winning the Belmont Stakes and notably earning second place in three important handicaps, the Jerome, the Peter Pan, and the Lawrence Realization plus a third in the Travers Stakes to winner and 1944 Champion 3-year-old colt, By Jimminy.

== Death ==
Bounding Home died suddenly on February 23, 1947, after a workout at Santa Anita.

An avid yachtsman, William Ziegler, Jr. named his 53-foot racing schooner for the horse.
