= Lennox House =

Historic house in Colorado, United States

- U.S. National Register of Historic Places
- Colorado State Register of Historic Properties No. 5EP.3359
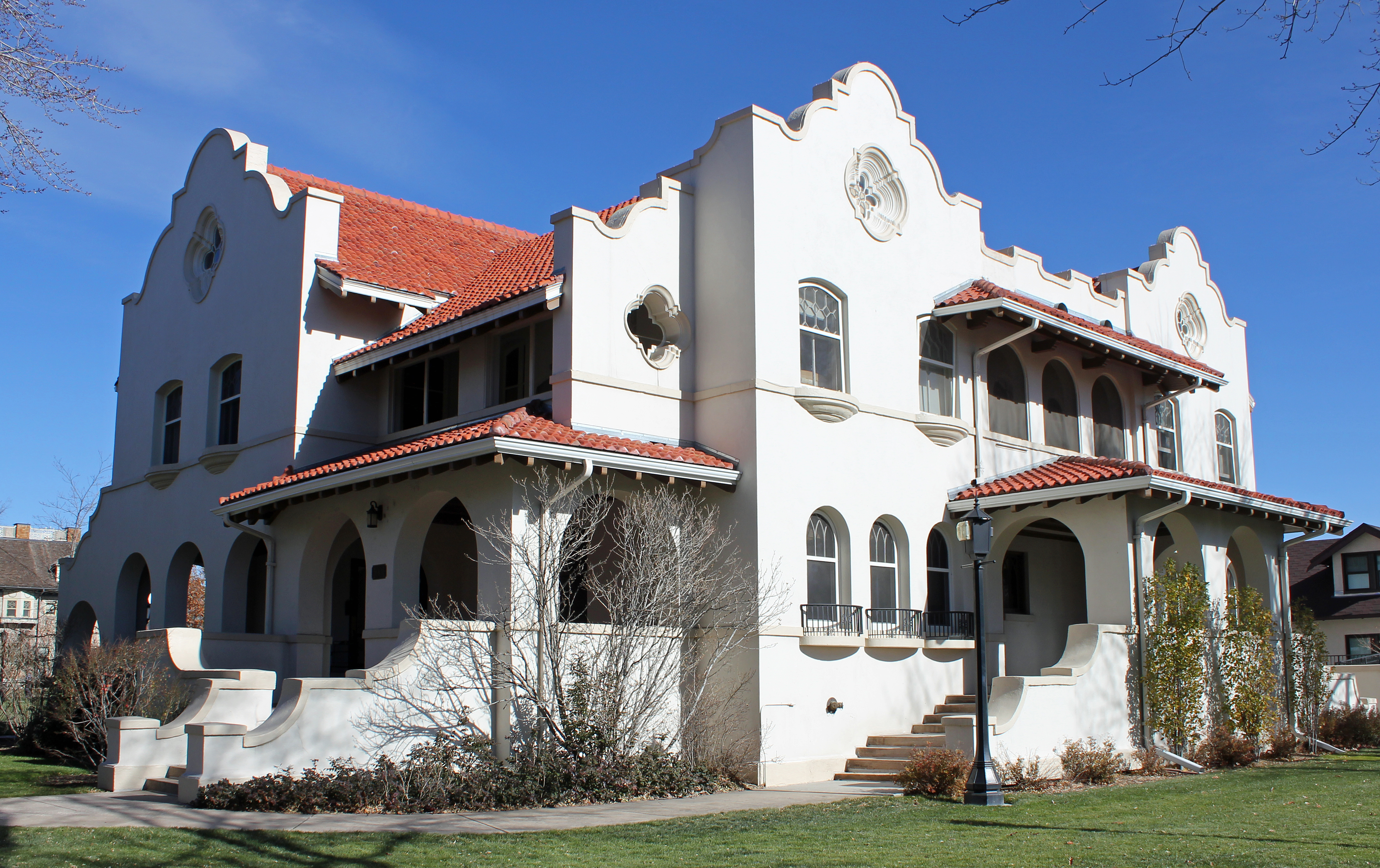

- Location within Colorado
- Location: 1001 N. Nevada Avenue, Colorado Springs, Colorado
- Coordinates: 38°50′53″N 104°49′10″W
- Built: 1900
- Built by: William Lennox
- Architect: Frederick J. Sterner
- Architectural style: Mission Revival
- NRHP reference No.: 99001266
- CSRHP No.: 5EP.3359
- Added to NRHP: October 21, 1999

The Lennox House is a house in Colorado Springs, Colorado on the National Register of Historic Places. It was added to the Colorado State Register of Historic Properties on August 11, 1999. It was built in 1900 by William Lennox and added to the National Register of Historic Places on October 21, 1999. It is private because it is residential. Added to the Colorado College campus in 1936, it served as the Student Union from 1937 to 1959.
