= William Ziegler House =

Mansion in Manhattan, New York

Coordinates: 40°45′58.9″N 73°58′14.9″W

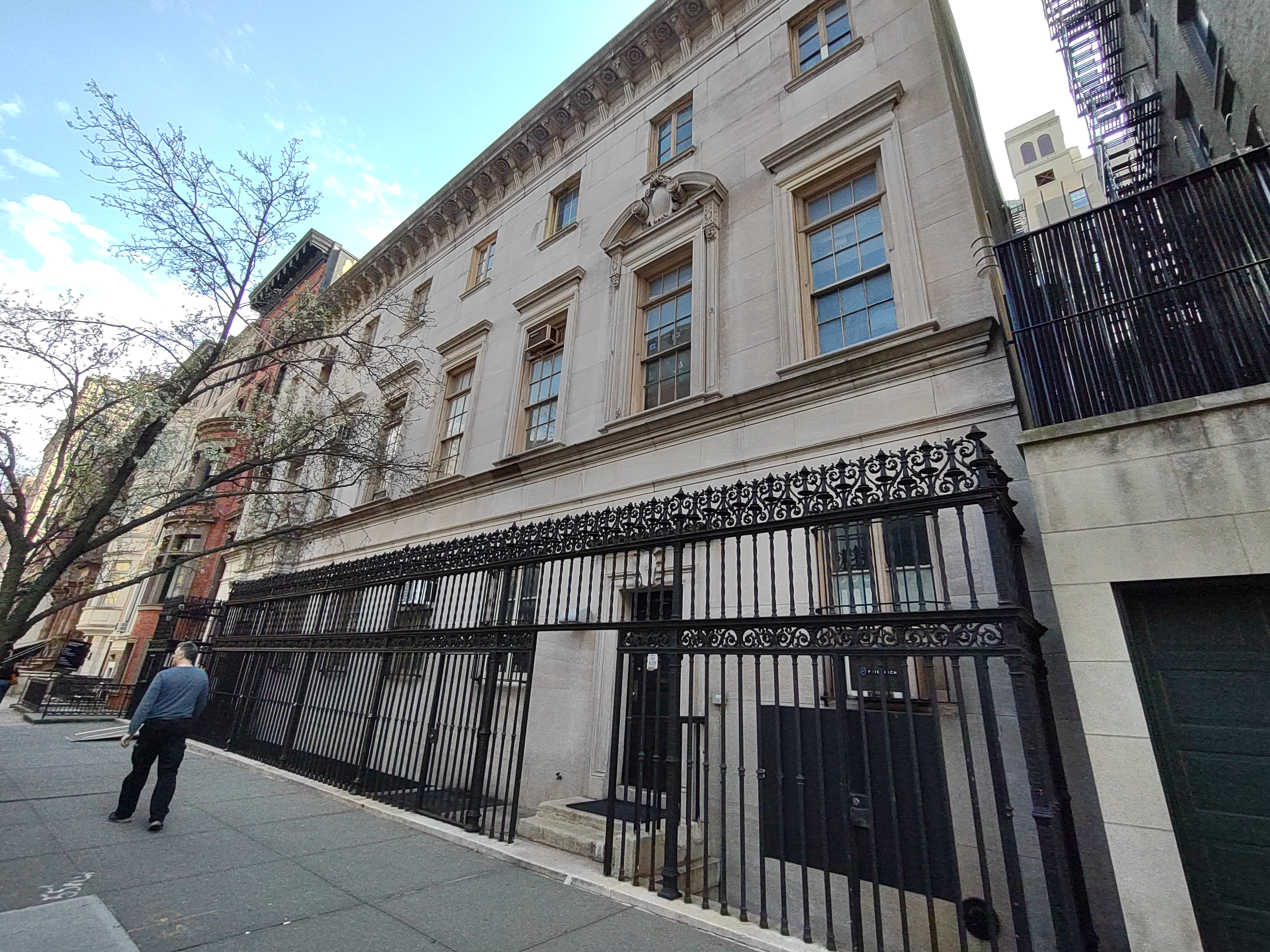
- Interactive map of the William Ziegler House area

General information
- Construction started: 1919
- Completed: 1921

Design and construction
- Architect: Frederick Sterner

The William Ziegler House is a former mansion at 2 East 63rd Street on the Upper East Side of Manhattan in New York City. It was designed by Frederick Sterner in 1919 for William Ziegler Jr. and constructed by 1921.

== History ==
He sold it to David Belasco for a 300-bed actors' hospital in 1926, then to Woolworth's relative Norman Bailey Woolworth in 1929, who then donated it to the New York Academy of Sciences in about 1949. They listed it for sale in 2001, but it didn't sell until 2005 when billionaire Leonard Blavatnik bought it for $31 million, who then said it was an investment for his Access Industries. It was still unoccupied in 2008.
