= North Huntingdon Township, Pennsylvania =

Township in Pennsylvania, US

Coordinates: 40°23′00″N 79°44′29″W

- Township
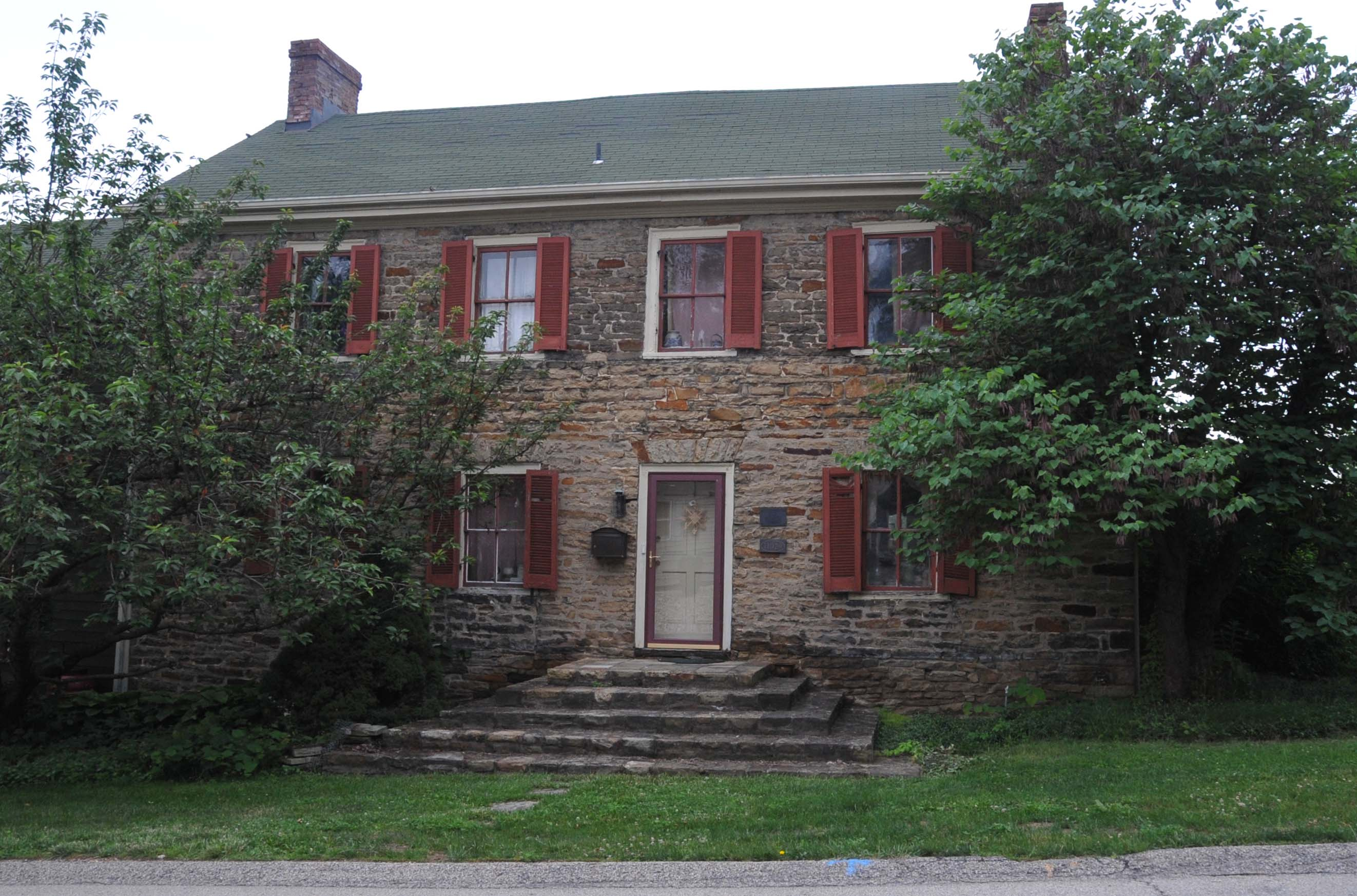
- The Fullerton Inn, a historic site in the township

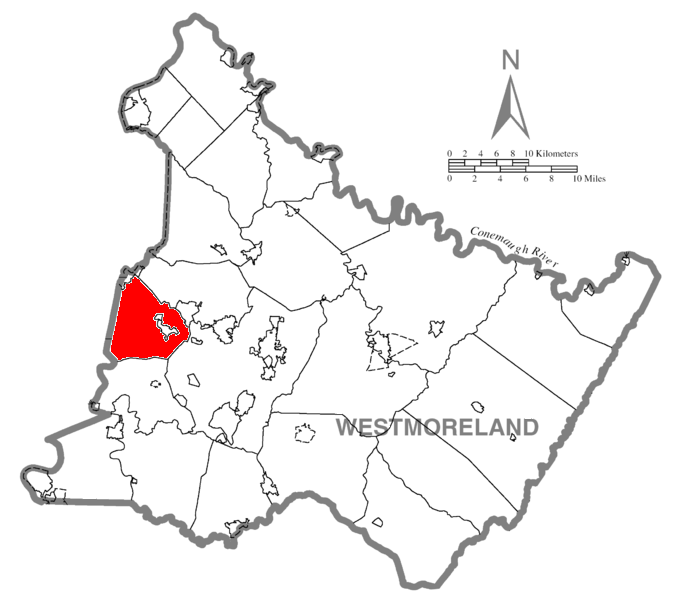
- Map of Westmoreland County, Pennsylvania Highlighting North Huntingdon Township

- Map of Pennsylvania highlighting Westmoreland County
- Country: United States
- State: Pennsylvania
- County: Westmoreland

Area
  - Total: 27.32 sq mi (70.75 km^{2})
  - Land: 27.26 sq mi (70.60 km^{2})
  - Water: 0.058 sq mi (0.15 km^{2})

Population (2020)
  - Total: 31,847 ▼
  - Estimate (2021): 31,757
  - Density: 1,125.5/sq mi (434.55/km^{2})
- Time zone: UTC-5 (Eastern (EST))
  - Summer (DST): UTC-4 (EDT)
- FIPS code: 42-129-55128
- Website: https://www.township.north-huntingdon.pa.us/

North Huntingdon Township is a township in Westmoreland County, Pennsylvania, United States. The population was 31,847 at the 2020 census.

== History ==
Named after England's Earl of Huntingdon, Huntingdon Township was founded on April 6, 1772, in Pennsylvania.

Huntingdon's boundaries started at the mouth of Brush Run where it emptied into Brush Creek. The area is approximately 26 square miles (67 km^{2})with the Township maintaining about 125 miles (200 km)of roads. If these roads were placed end-to-end, they would stretch from North Huntingdon to Cleveland, Ohio. The boundaries, following along Byerly's Path to Braddock Road, continued to the lines that mark Mount Pleasant, Tyrone and Pitt Townships. Huntingdon Township was later divided into the townships North Huntingdon, East Huntingdon, South Huntingdon and Sewickley. Around this same time, Westmoreland County, where North Huntingdon is located, became the townships of Fairfield, Donegal, Mount Pleasant, Hempfield, Pitt, Tyrone, Springhill, Menallen, Rostraver and Armstrong.

Many Native American tribes inhabited this area before the European settlers. The Alligewe Indians are believed to be the first people to live in this area. After this tribe, there were also the Shawnee, Seneca, Cornplanter and Delaware, also known as Lenni Lenape, tribes. The first white man did not come along until 1662.

Arnold Viele, a Dutch trader from Albany, New York was the first white man to enter this territory. Viele had wanted to establish Indian trading posts that were closer to other communities. In doing this, he persuaded the Shawnee tribe to move near the Potomac and Susquehanna Rivers. After Viele, James Le Tort, Andrew Montour, Conrad Weiser and George Croghan were some of the other settlers to move to North Huntingdon.

Many different European groups settled in this area. Two of them were the German and Scottish-Irish immigrants. In the late 1670s, North Huntingdon Township was settled from both the eastern and western ends. This section is divided but what is now known as Irwin. The Germans settled in the east and to the west was the Scottish-Irish settlement. In the German settlement, the Lutheran church ran the schools, and they exclusively taught the German language. The Scottish-Irish settlement was Presbyterian. This group settled mostly in the areas of Circleville, Cavitt's Mills and Robbin's Station.

The settlers wanted to provide their children with some education in their new homes. Farmers donated land so they could have schools for their children that weren't far from home. The schools were made with logs and a clapboard roof. Established in 1782, Birch Spring School was the first school in the township. It was also called Master Jack's school after its first teacher. Teachers did not have to meet many requirements to get the job. They had to pass an exam and have a basic knowledge of reading, writing and math. They also had to know how to mend quill pens and wield birch rods. Another school named Fairview was built in 1816. This school was used in the eastern end of the township, while Master Jack's school was used in the western end. Today, Norwin Middle School is located in the area.

Schools were not the only thing that these settlers built. They also made their homes. The homes were about 10 feet (3m) high with only one room and one window. They had to use mud for insulation against the cold winters. Chairs were made of logs and beds were stuffed with hay or straw. There was a hole in the roof, instead of a chimney, to let cooking smoke out of the house.

About a century after the German and Scottish-Irish settlers, the Township's population was recorded as 3,000 in 1860. According to a census taken in 1980, North Huntingdon Township was the second largest municipality in Westmoreland County with 31,517 residents. Another census in 2000 recorded that the population was down to 29,123 people.

The Fullerton Inn and Andrew and Jennie McFarlane House are listed on the National Register of Historic Places.

== Geography ==
According to the U.S. Census Bureau, the township has a total area of 27.4 square miles (70.9 km^{2}), of which 27.3 square miles (70.8 km^{2}) is land and 0.04 square mile (0.1 km^{2}) (0.15%) is water.

It is traversed by the Pennsylvania Turnpike (Interstate 76) and by Lincoln Highway (US 30). The southwestern corner of the township borders the Youghiogheny River for about 1½ Km.

== Demographics ==
Historical population
Census	Pop.	Note	%±
1970	29,443		—
1980	31,517		7.0%
1990	28,158		−10.7%
2000	29,123		3.4%
2010	30,609		5.1%
2020	31,847		4.0%
2021 (est.)	31,757		−0.3%
U.S. Decennial Census

At the 2000 census, there were 29,123 people, 11,216 households, and 8,625 families living in the township. The population density was 1,065.7 inhabitants per square mile (411.5/km^{2}). There were 11,578 housing units at an average density of 423.7 per square mile (163.6/km^{2}). The racial makeup of the township was 98.82% White, 0.32% African American, 0.04% Native American, 0.39% Asian, 0.02% Pacific Islander, 0.05% from other races, and 0.36% from two or more races. Hispanic or Latino of any race were 0.41%.

Of the 11,216 households 29.7% had children under the age of 18 living with them, 66.3% were married couples living together, 8.0% had a female householder with no husband present, and 23.1% were non-families. 20.8% of households were one person and 10.1% were one person aged 65 or older. The average household size was 2.56 and the average family size was 2.96.

The age distribution was 21.8% under the age of 18, 6.0% from 18 to 24, 27.6% from 25 to 44, 26.8% from 45 to 64, and 17.7% 65 or older. The median age was 42 years. For every 100 females there were 93.7 males. For every 100 females age 18 and over, there were 91.1 males.

The median household income was $45,376 and the median family income was $51,933. Males had a median income of $39,693 versus $26,285 for females. The per capita income for the township was $20,786. About 4.4% of families and 5.5% of the population were below the poverty line, including 6.8% of those under age 18 and 5.9% of those age 65 or over.

== Government & Politics ==
North Huntingdon is a first class township. The township is governed by a board of commissioners. The township has seven wards. Each ward elects a commissioner for a four year term.

== Works cited ==
- The Diamond: Official Publication Commemorating Irwin's 75th Anniversary Celebration. Irwin: Rodgers Printing Company, 1939.
- Roth, Bernard B. (Ed.) 10 Score: North Huntingdon Township. Norwin Community: 1973.
- Historian, A.L.; Irwin and the World Around It. Irwin: Key Art/Print Production and Laurel Quick Print, 1989.
