= Fullerton Inn =

- U.S. National Register of Historic Places
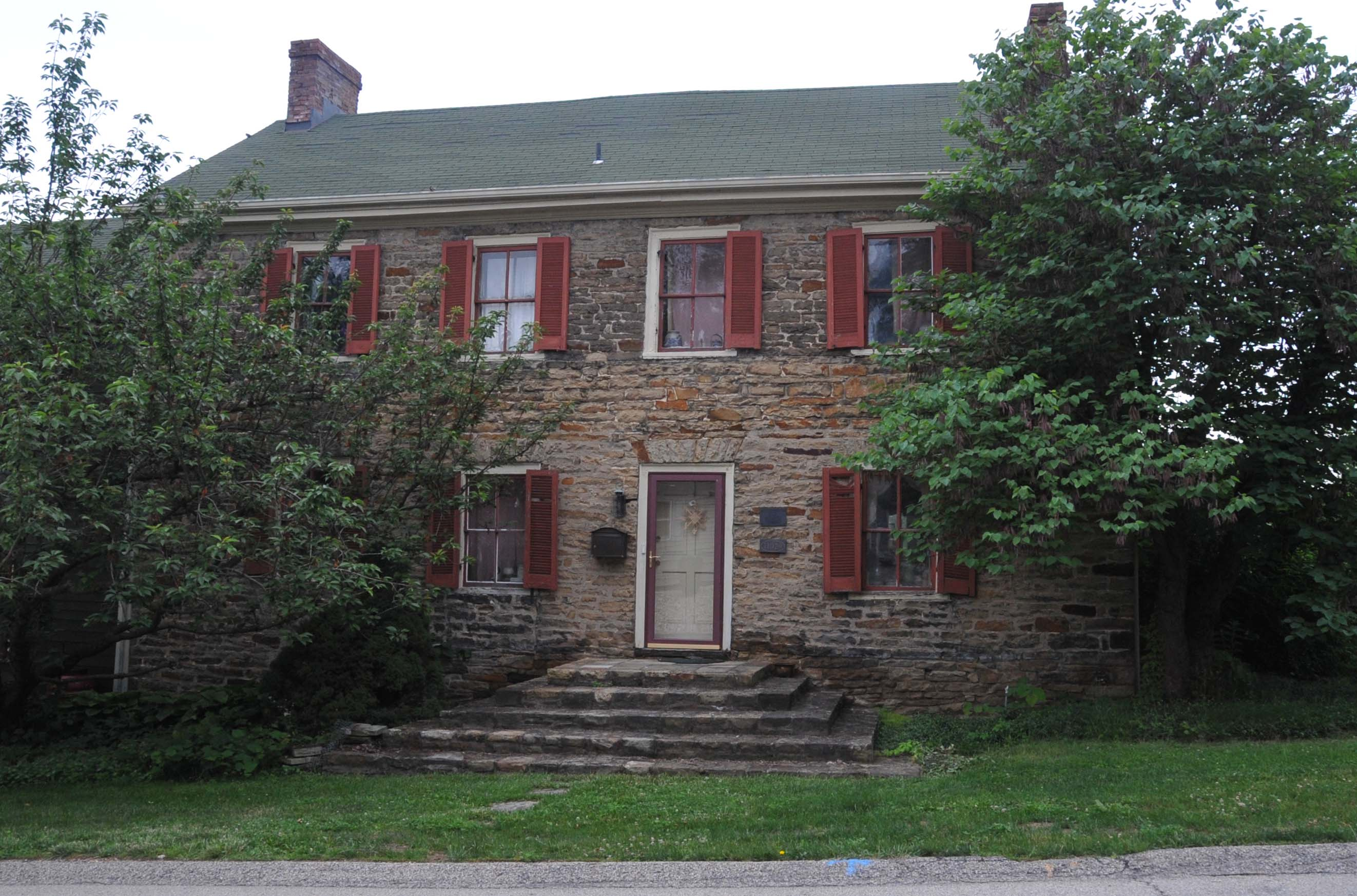
- Fullerton Inn, June 2013

- Location within Pennsylvania Location within the United States
- Location: 11029 Old Trail Road, west of Irwin, North Huntingdon Township, Pennsylvania
- Coordinates: 40°19′47″N 79°43′35″W
- Area: 1 acre (0.40 ha)
- Built: 1798, 1805
- Architectural style: Federal
- NRHP reference No.: 83002285
- Added to NRHP: June 30, 1983

The Fullerton Inn, also known as the Jacktown Inn, Jacksonville Hotel, and Fullerton-Sverdrup House, is an historic inn and tavern which is located in North Huntingdon Township, Westmoreland County, Pennsylvania.

It was added to the National Register of Historic Places on June 30, 1983.

It has been a private residence for more than 60 years.

== History and architectural features ==
Built in 1798 by William Fullerton, this structure is a two-and-one-half-story, four-bay, stone building, which was designed in the Federal style. A five-bay, wood-frame addition was built in 1805. Both sections have gable roofs. It operated as an inn into the late 19th century.
