= Electa Matilda Ziegler =

American philanthropist (1841–1932)

- Born: April 13, 1841; Schuylerville, New York, U.S.
- Died: September 1, 1932; New York City
- Occupation: magazine publisher; philanthropist
- Notable works: Matilda Ziegler Magazine for the Blind
- Spouse: Edward Gamble (divorced); William Ziegler (m. 1886)

Electa Matilda Ziegler (née, Curtis; after first marriage, Gamble; after second marriage, Ziegler; April 13, 1841 – September 1, 1932) was an American philanthropist who founded the Matilda Ziegler Magazine for the Blind.

== Early life ==
Electa Matilda Curtis was born in Schuylerville, New York, the daughter of Henry D. and Electa Abel Curtis.

== Career ==
After her second husband's death in 1905, Ziegler commanded a significant fortune. She took an interest in the education of blind students because of her son, Charles, who was blinded in an accident as a child. In 1907, she established a monthly magazine known as the Matilda Ziegler Magazine for the Blind, which was printed in braille and other raised-print (embossed) systems. Edited by Walter G. Holmes, the Ziegler offered 48 pages of fiction, scientific articles, current events, instruction in handiwork, and occasionally raised maps. Through the generosity of Ziegler, it was furnished without charge, and by a special provision of the U. S. Congress, it was sent free to every blind person in the United States or Canada who could read braille. Helen Keller said of Ziegler, "She must realize the happiness and encouragement which the magazine has brought during twenty-five years to the dwellers of darkland. Thousands upon thousands utter with affection her name."

== Personal life ==
Curtis's first marriage was to Edward Gamble; they had a son, Charles, before they divorced. Charles Gamble died in 1917. Her second marriage, on July 22, 1886, was to William Ziegler (1843–1905), an industrialist who co-founded the Royal Baking Powder Company. The Zieglers adopted a daughter, Florence, and a son, William Ziegler Jr. (1891-1958), who became president of the American Foundation for the Blind.

== Death and legacy ==
Electa Matilda Ziegler died in 1932, aged 91 years, in New York City. The E. Matilda Ziegler Foundation for the Blind continues her work by funding research on blindness and eye disease; the magazine ceased hard-copy and audio publication in 2009.
