= Tears–McFarlane House =

- U.S. National Register of Historic Places
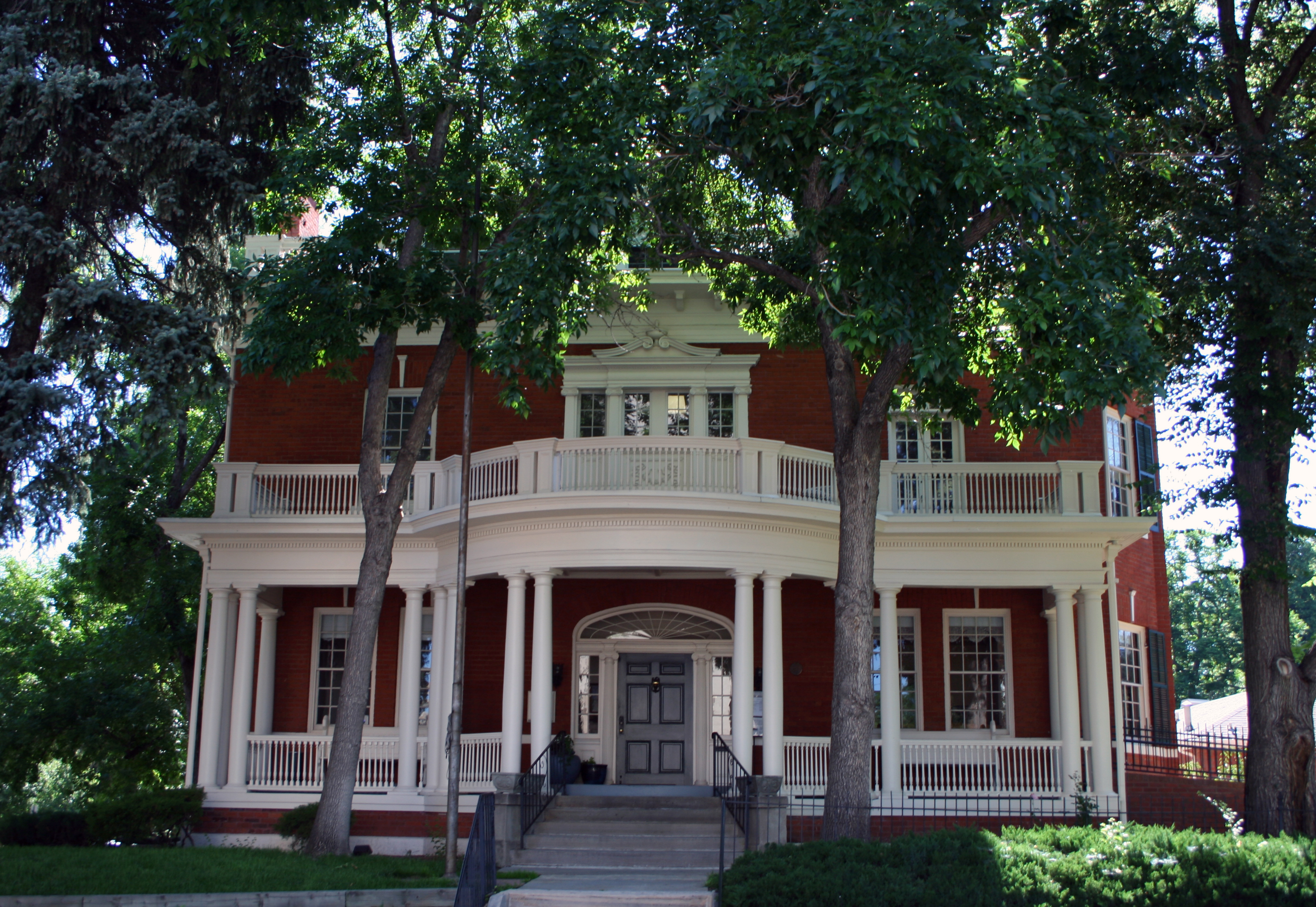

- Location within Colorado Location within the United States
- Location: 1290 Williams Street, Cheesman Park, Denver, Colorado
- Coordinates: 39°44′11.96″N 104°57′56.48″W
- Built: 1898
- Architect: Frederick Sterner
- Architectural style: Georgian architecture
- NRHP reference No.: 76000557
- Added to NRHP: January 11, 1976

Tears–McFarlane House is a historic house located in Denver, Colorado, that was listed on the National Register of Historic Places on January 11, 1976. It was designed by Frederick Sterner.

Railroad attorney Daniel W. Tears and his wife commissioned the construction of the Georgian-style house in 1898. They lived in the house for more than 40 years, and during that time became Denver socialites. In 1937, the house was purchased by Ida Kruse McFarlane and Frederick McFarlane. Ida was an English professor at the University of Denver, who helped restore the Central City Opera House. After her death, Frederick married Lillian Cushing, a dancer and actress, who gave dancing lessons in a studio in the basement.

In 1966, it became the residence and offices of Gary Hart, who was then a United States senator. It became the Greater Capitol Hill Events Center in 1977 and is now the Center for the People of Capitol Hill.
