= Matilda Ziegler Magazine for the Blind =

Magazine printed in New York City

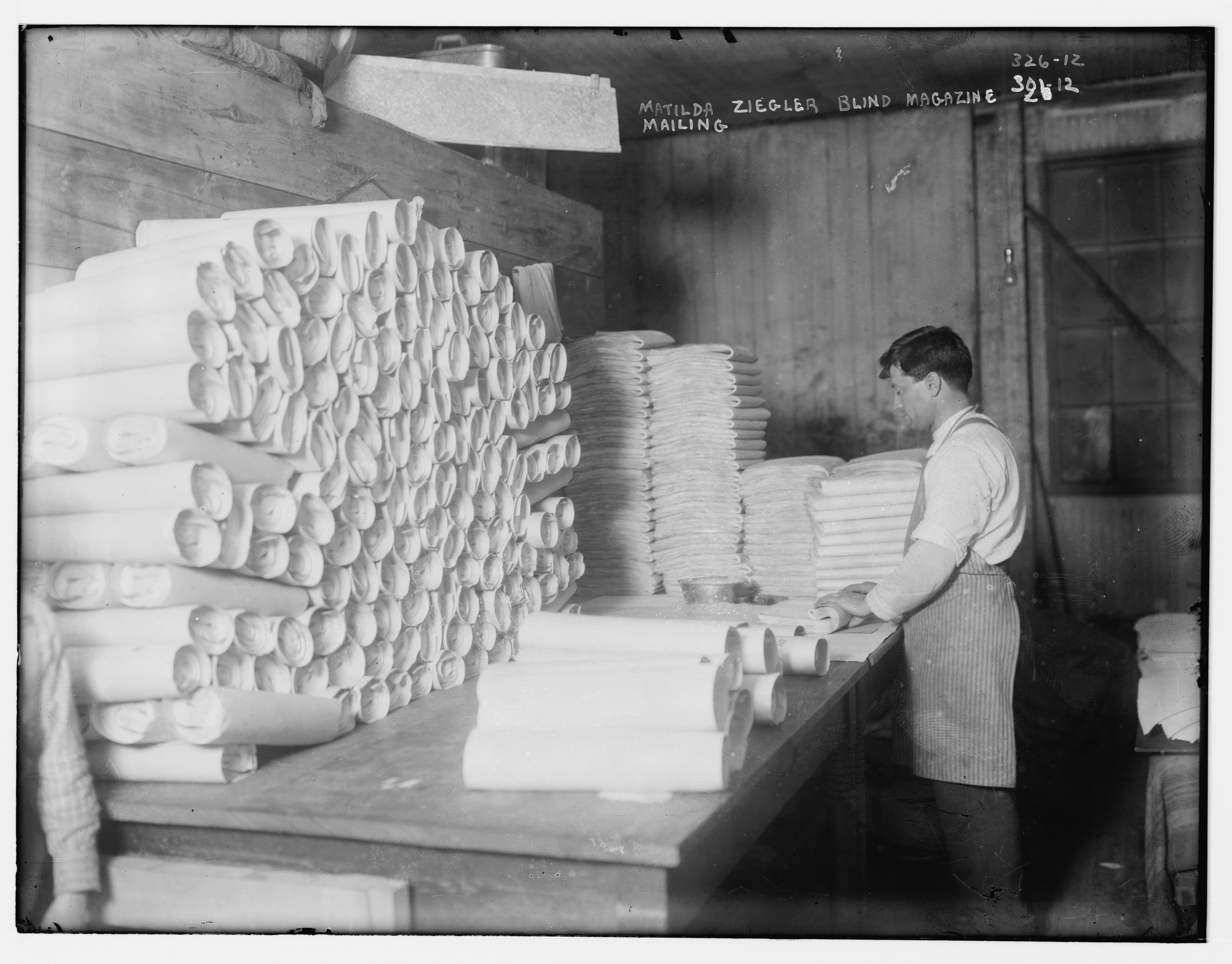
Preparing the magazine for mailing

Matilda Ziegler Magazine for the Blind (nickname, Ziegler) was a general-interest magazine for the blind and visually impaired, printed in New York City, New York, US. Founded in March 1907 by Electa Matilda Ziegler, it ended publication in 2014.

== Establishment ==
In 1906, Walter G. Holmes of The Commercial Appeal traveled to New York City for business and while reading the New York Herald, saw a piece regarding a legacy of several thousand dollars for various charitable purposes. He wrote to the editor asking why the blind were not included in the legacy, and within a day he received a reply: "I saw your communication today and as I am interested in doing something for the blind along the printing line I would like to communicate with you. (Signed) E. M. Ziegler." Ziegler, the widow of industrialist and Arctic expeditionary financer William Ziegler, was an heiress with a blind son. Holmes was middle-aged and had a blind brother. Holmes ("Uncle Walter") became the magazine's first editor and publisher, remaining the editor for 39 years.

== History ==
In its first year of publication, the magazine had a circulation of 6,500 in 1907. A nominal price of US$0.10 a year was charged for subscription to make it eligible for second-class mailing. Each copy was a volume of fifty pages. A special bill was introduced in the U.S. Congress in 1908 to allow it to become a free publication. By 1919, in the US, there were only large magazines for the blind and visually impaired circulated for free: Christian Record Services for the Blind, and the Matilda Ziegler Magazine. The Ziegler printed 96,000 copies per year, which meant the printing of more than 500,000 pages per month, and over 6,000,000 pages per year, while Christian Record Services for the Blind printed about half as much.

After Matilda Ziegler's death, her son, William Ziegler Jr. took over the company and her foundations. After William Jr. died, Helen Keller wrote a tribute to him in The New York Times.

In 2009, the magazine became an online version only, but by 2014, all publication was discontinued.

== Publication ==
The magazine was established to give people without sight access to articles from print periodicals in braille, New York Point, and Moon type format. Printed on brown paper using mostly recycled material, it was mailed in a large envelope, postage-free, because of an act of Congress. Only the cover had writing, which included the magazine name, address (20 West 17th Street), and the line, "Founded in 1907 by Mrs. William Ziegler and endowed by her so that blind people may receive it free of charge."

Each issue contained a high-class story, poetry, news of the day in condensed form and one sheet of popular music. Letters from blind people describing work done successfully were published for the encouragement of others. Prizes were offered for contributions of merit by the blind. The magazine was for the blind and by the blind, as far as possible. A printing plant was established for the printing of the publication, as well as books for blind readers, in which positions were filled by blind persons as far as practical. The paper on which the magazine was printed was furnished by a blind man. As there were two prevailing styles of type, each edition was made up in both types with one-third of the copies of each edition printed in "Braille", and two-thirds in "New York Point". The magazine, which initially cost approximately $20,000 a year, was a charitable undertaking and not a money-making enterprise. It was carried on and circulated wholly at the expense of the founder; no advertisements were solicited.

== Bibliography ==
- Cranston & Stowe (1907). The Epworth Herald (Public domain ed.). Cranston & Stowe.
- The Editor (1907). Journal of Information for Literary Workers. Vol. 25–26 (Public domain ed.).
- Koestler, Frances A. (2004). The Unseen Minority: A Social History of Blindness in the United States. American Foundation for the Blind. ISBN 978-0-89128-896-1.
- Massachusetts Association for Promoting the Interests of the Blind (1919). Outlook for the Blind. Vol. 13 (Public domain ed.). Massachusetts Association for Promoting the Interests of the Blind.
- The Trustees (1907). Annual List of New and Important Books Added to the Public Library of the City of Boston (Public domain ed.). The Trustees.
