= Highland School (Boulder, Colorado) =

- U.S. National Register of Historic Places
- Colorado State Register of Historic Properties
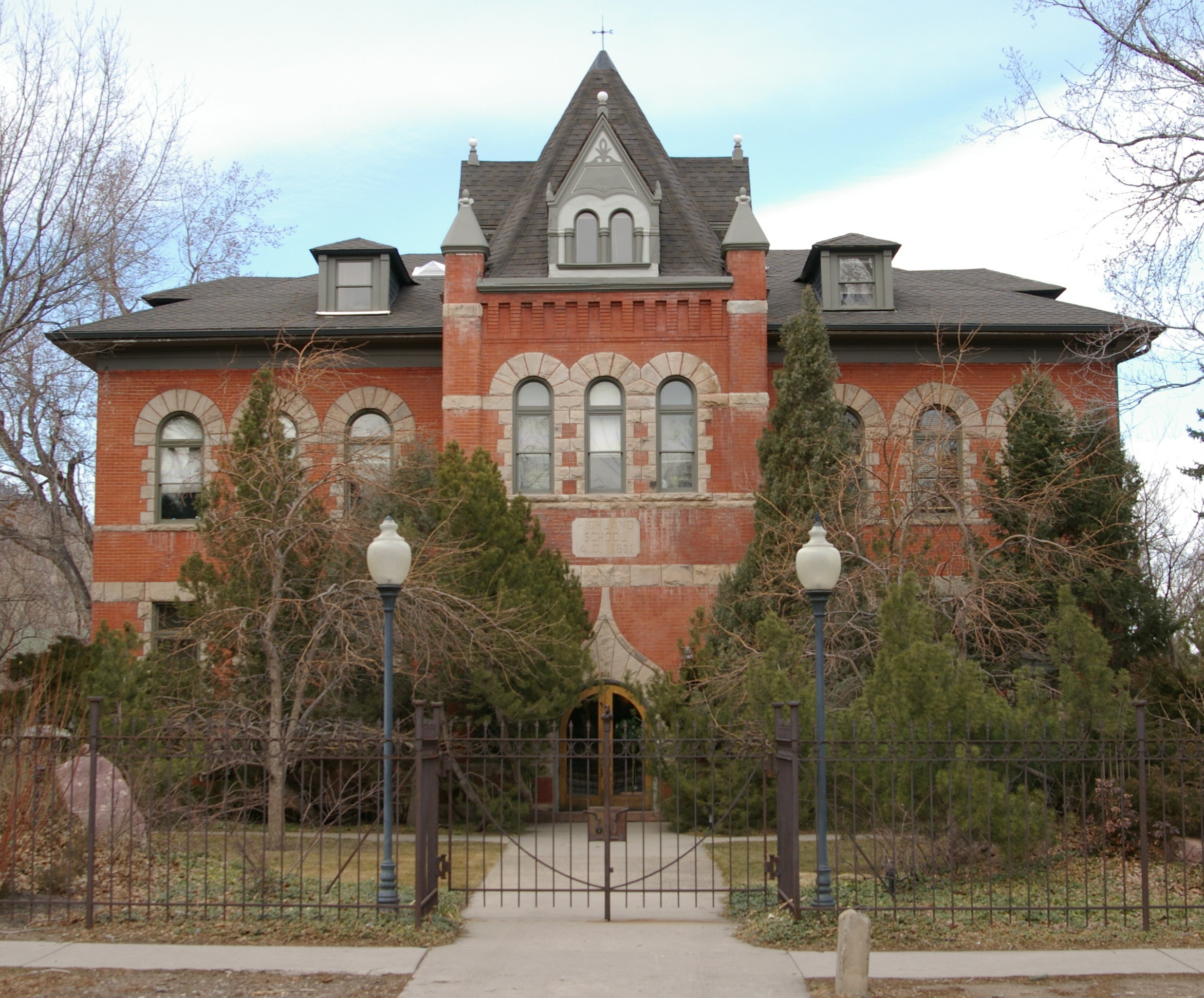

- Location within Colorado Location within the United States
- Location: 885 Arapahoe Ave., Boulder, Colorado
- Coordinates: 40°0′48″N 105°17′1″W
- Area: 0.8 acres (0.32 ha)
- Built: 1891 or 1892; 1923
- Architect: E.P. Varian and Frederick Sterner
- Architectural style: Gothic and Romanesque Revival
- NRHP reference No.: 78000831
- CSRHP No.: 5BL.364
- Added to NRHP: December 18, 1978

Highland School, also or previously known as Highland-Lawn School, is an 1892 building at 9th Street and Arapahoe Avenue in Boulder, Colorado. It was the fourth school built in Boulder and was used as a school until 1971. The Highland School Building was converted to use as an office building and placed on the National Register of Historic Places in 1978. The building is constructed of red brick and blond sandstone mined from local quarries.

Highland School was threatened with demolition in 1971. Civic leaders opposed to the demolition of the School and nearby Central School (Boulder, Colorado) formed Historic Boulder, Inc. to advocate for its preservation.

The school was designed by the Denver firm of Varian and Sterner in 1890. It was doubled in size in a 1923 extension which was designed to be entirely compatible to the original building.
