= Barbara Rutherford Hatch House =

House in Manhattan, New York

- U.S. National Register of Historic Places
- U.S. Historic district – Contributing property
- New York State Register of Historic Places
- New York City Landmark
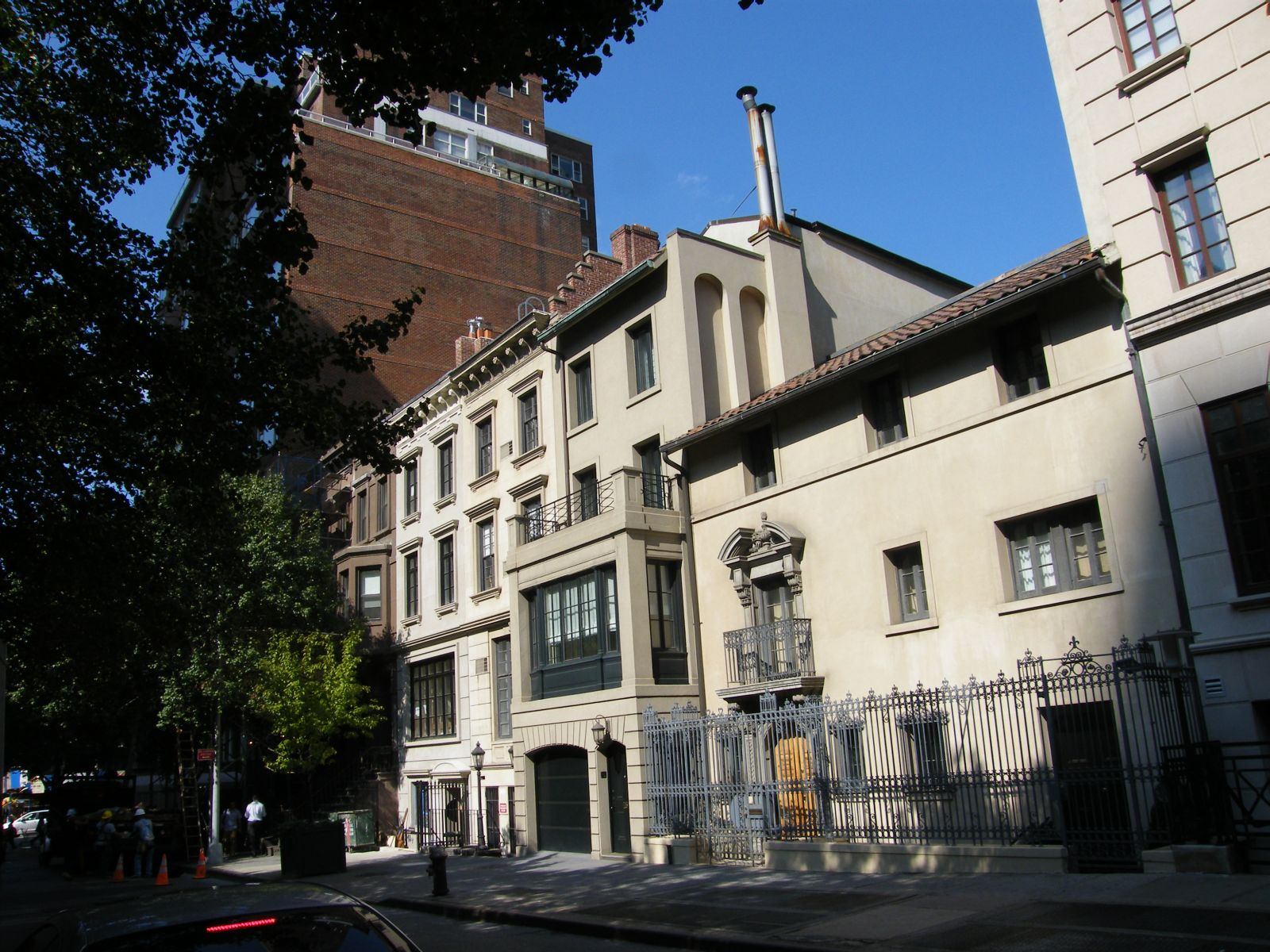

- Location within Manhattan Location within New York City Location within New York Location within the United States
- Location: 153 E. 63rd St., New York, New York
- Coordinates: 40°45′52″N 73°57′56″W
- Area: less than one acre
- Built: 1917
- Architect: Frederick J. Sterner
- Architectural style: Late 19th And 20th Century Revivals, Spanish-Italian Renaissance
- Part of: Upper East Side Historic District (ID06000822)
- NRHP reference No.: 83001728
- NYSRHP No.: 06101.001700
- NYCL No.: 0943

Significant dates
- Added to NRHP: 1983-06-09
- Designated NYSRHP: 1983-03-31
- Designated NYCL: 1977-01-11

The Barbara Rutherford Hatch House is a residential building at 153 East 63rd Street on the Upper East Side of Manhattan in New York City, New York, US. It was constructed between 1917 and 1919. It was designed by Frederick J. Sterner and patterned after a French Renaissance-style chateau. The house is three stories high, with a stucco facade, red-tile roof, and interior courtyard.

Originally built for Barbara Cairncross Rutherfurd (Note: Barbara's surname is formally spelled "Rutherfurd", but sources spell the house's name with an "o" (i.e. "Rutherford").) and Cyril Hatch, it has been occupied over the years by the producer Charles Dillingham, the engineer Charles Lawrance, the performer Gypsy Rose Lee, the artist Jasper Johns, and the filmmaker Spike Lee. The house is listed on the National Register of Historic Places both individually and as a contributing property to the Upper East Side Historic District, and it is also a New York City designated landmark.

== Description ==
The Hatch House is located at 153 East 63rd Street on the Upper East Side of Manhattan in New York City, New York, US. The house occupies a site measuring 100 by 32 feet (30.5 m × 9.8 m) wide. It was designed by Frederick Sterner in the Spanish Colonial Revival style, with elements of the Italian Renaissance. The Hatch House was Sterner's second commission on the block, after his own house at 154 West 63rd Street. After completing these two buildings, Sterner designed other buildings in a similar style; the architectural historian Christopher Gray wrote that Sterner had "succeeded in almost completely Mediterraneanizing the block". The Barbara Rutherford Hatch House is listed on the National Register of Historic Places since 1983 and is a New York City designated landmark since 1977. In addition, it is a contributing property to the Upper East Side Historic District Extension, which is listed on the National Register; the house was added to the district in 2006. The Barbizon 63 apartment building is immediately to the west.

The Hatch House is three stories high, making it shorter than the neighboring buildings, which were necessarily higher in density due to the area's high land values. The house is set back from an areaway, which in turn is placed behind a wrought iron fence running along the sidewalk. The facade is made of gray painted stucco and is divided vertically into three bays. At the first floor, the outer two bays contain doorways, while the center bay has two narrow windows with grilles. The main entrance is in the leftmost (western) first-floor bay, with a stone frame. Brackets, flanking the top of the main entrance, support a balcony protruding from the second floor's leftmost bay; above the balcony opening is a broken pediment shaped like a segmental arch. There are two additional windows in the center and rightmost bays of the second floor. A band course runs beneath the third floor, connecting the windowsills of the three rectangular windows on that floor. The roof is made of red tile.

According to the New York City Department of City Planning, the house has a gross floor area of 6,528 square feet (606.5 m^{2}). The building has its own interior courtyard, an unusual feature for a townhouse in New York City. The courtyard is flanked by two wings, which are joined in a U-shaped arrangement. There are five bedrooms and five bathrooms. The front of the house's first floor has a foyer decorated with frescoes, along with a sitting room. There is a living room at the rear of that floor. On the second floor, there are bedrooms at the front and a dining room and salon at the rear. Additional bedrooms occupy the third floor.

== History ==
=== Development ===
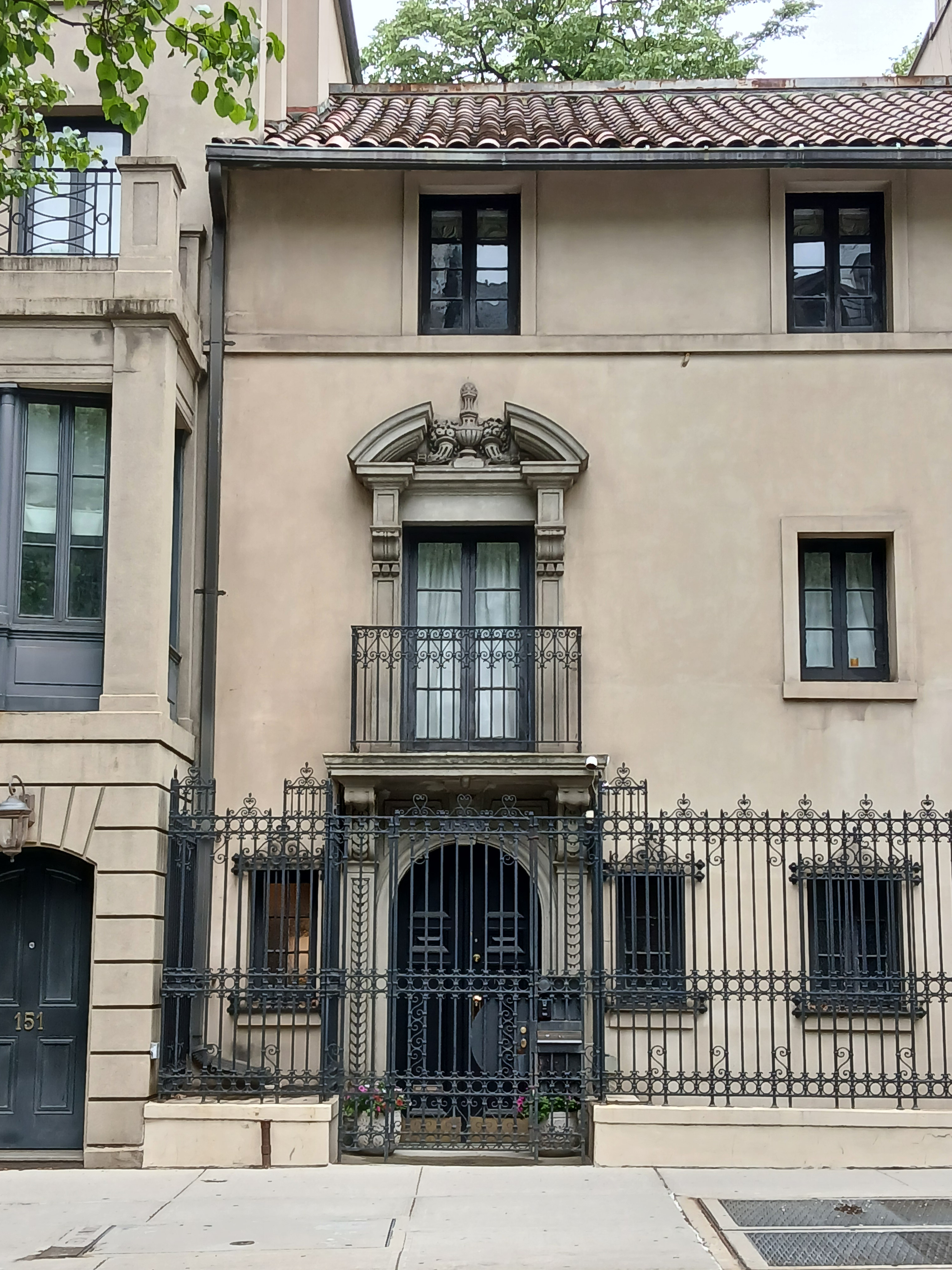
Close-up of entrance

The Hatch House was created through the combination of two older buildings. The surrounding blocks between Lexington Avenue and Third Avenue had first been developed with smaller brownstone buildings in the late 19th century. As part of a wider trend of redevelopment around Park Avenue (one block west of Lexington Avenue), these were gradually being replaced with mansions in the early 20th century.

The house's first occupant was Barbara Cairncross Rutherfurd, a Vanderbilt family heiress and daughter of the businessman William K. Vanderbilt; she lived there with her husband Cyril Hatch. After the couple were wed in June 1916, Rutherfurd's mother Anne Harriman agreed to give a house as a wedding present. Harriman obtained two sites at 153 and 155 East 63rd Street, which had been the site of the Drexel stable. At the time, the sites had been on sale with an asking price of $85,000. The couple temporarily lived in a nearby apartment building while the house was being built. Frederick Sterner was hired to design the house, which was built between 1917 and 1919. After completing the Hatch House, Sterner designed multiple other properties on the same block.

=== Later owners ===
The Hatches had divorced by 1920, three years after commissioning the house. As such, in 1920, it was acquired by the theatre producer Charles Dillingham, who paid $200,000 for the property. Dillingham, his wife, and their housekeeping staff all lived there. During Dillingham's occupancy, the sitting room was decorated with paneled walls, and he installed an 18th-century painting, dolphin-shaped household hardware, and basins made of imported Carrara marble. Town & Country magazine subsequently wrote that the house had hosted so many theatrical conferences that "in the quiet of the night, [the walls] murmur disconsolately, 'The second act is weak'". Dillingham sold the building in 1928 to the aeronautical engineer Charles Lawrance.

The Hatch House was obtained by the performer Gypsy Rose Lee in 1940 or 1943. Lee painted the dark ceilings in sky blue. She installed pillars that she had found on Third Avenue, constructing a colonnade; she paid $5 each for the columns themselves and $40 to transport the columns. Lee also decorated the interior with works from such artists as Pablo Picasso, Pavel Tchelitchew, Max Ernst, and Marc Chagall. The New York Times reported that Lee had decorated the courtyard with a large semicircular fountain and a small greenhouse. Lee sold the building for $175,000 in 1962, giving a mortgage loan to the buyer.

The house was subsequently occupied by the painter Jasper Johns in the 1980s. Johns initially spent $150,000 renovating the interior but paid relatively little attention to the exterior. The house's stucco facade was rebuilt by 1100 Architect in 1993. As part of the exterior renovation, the ironwork was removed for restoration, and cracks in the wall were repaired. In 1998 or 1999, the filmmaker Spike Lee (no relation to Gypsy Rose Lee) bought the house from Johns for $16.6 million. Lee placed the building for sale in 2013 for $32 million, lowering his price after he received no offers. The house remained unsold for over two years. As of 2026, the Department of City Planning lists Spike Lee as the owner.

== See also ==
- List of New York City Designated Landmarks in Manhattan from 59th to 110th Streets
- National Register of Historic Places listings in Manhattan from 59th to 110th Streets

== Sources ==
- National Register of Historic Places Inventory/Nomination: Barbara Rutherford Hatch House (PDF) (Report). National Park Service. 1983. With accompanying pictures
- Barbara Rutherford Hatch House (PDF) (Report). New York City Landmarks Preservation Commission. January 11, 1977.
