= Frederick Sterner =

American architect

Frederick Sterner (1862 – 1931) was a British-born American architect, who designed large residential and commercial buildings in Colorado and New York City. Many of his structures are listed on the National Register of Historic Places.

== Early life ==
Born in London in 1862, Sterner moved to the United States in 1878 or 1882, following his German-born father, Julius. His father sold liquor to prospectors in California and in the 1880s became a liquor merchant in Chicago. His brother was the artist Albert Sterner.

== Career ==
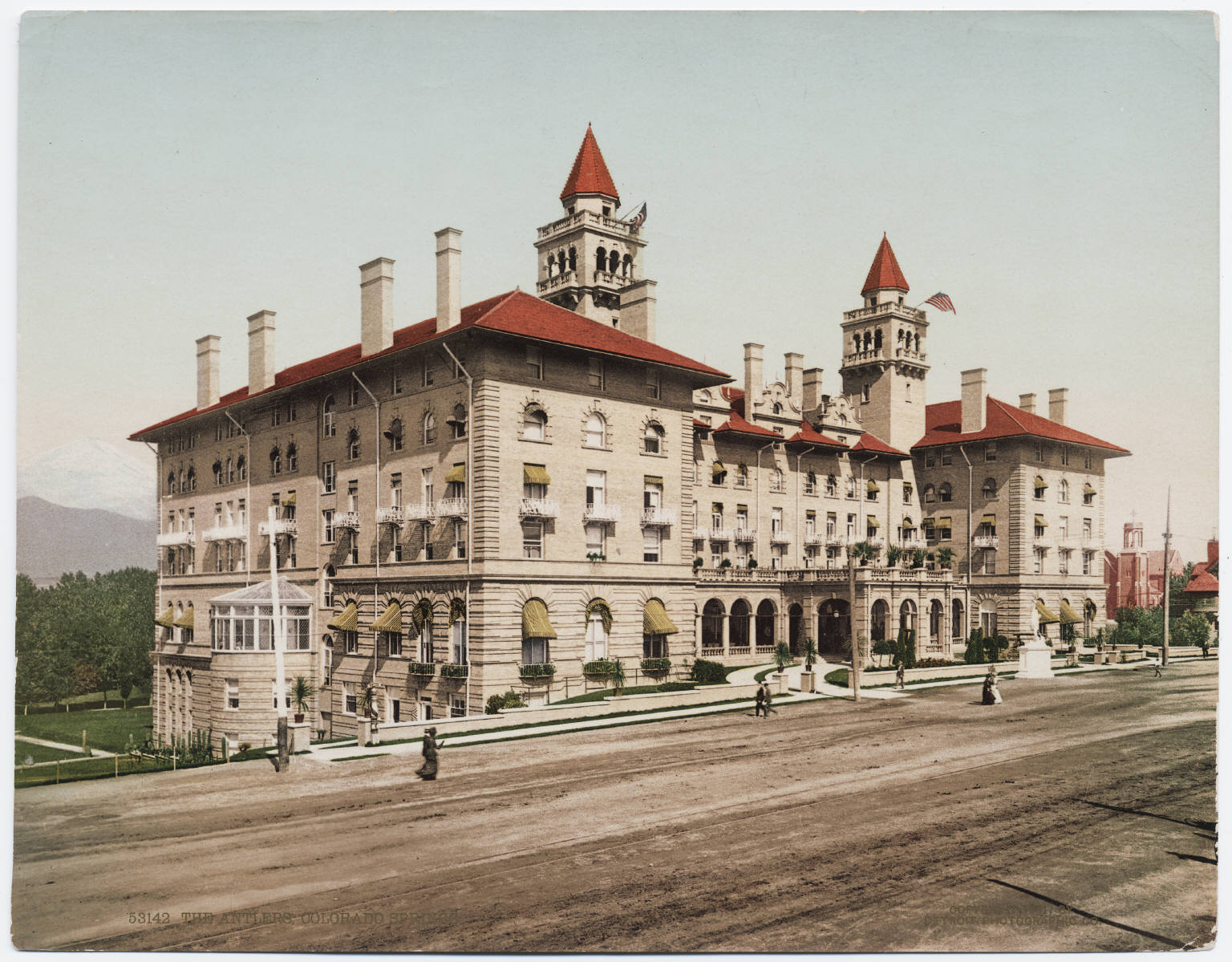
Antlers Hotel, Colorado Springs, Colorado

He worked as a draftsman with the Chicago architect Frank E. Edbrooke from 1882 to 1884. He then worked in Denver with Ernest Varian until 1901. He started his own architectural office, later hiring George H. Williamson as a draftsman. In 1905, Williamson became a formal partner. Sterner worked in Colorado for two decades, during which he primarily designed large residences for wealthy Coloradoans. His designs included Italian Renaissance, Richardsonian Romanesque, Dutch Colonial Revival, Colonial Revival, Mission Revival, and Shingle style architecture.

One of Varian and Sterner's most important works is the Romanesque Revival style Denver Athletic Club (1889). After he left Varion, Sterner sought work outside of Denver. He designed commercial buildings like the Minnequa Steel Works Office Building and Dispensary (1901) in Pueblo as well as the Antlers Hotel (1901) in Colorado Springs, which was eclectic for its time. He also contributed to the design consolidation of William Jackson Palmer's rambling estate, Glen Eyrie and commissioned work from Dr. William A. Bell, Dr. S.G. Solby, Sherwood Aldrich, and others in Colorado Springs.

His brother Albert lived in New York City and Sterner took up residence in 1906, while also continuing to work in Denver. He moved to New York full-time in 1909, but is credited along with Williamson in the design of the Daniels and Fisher Department Store.

In 1908, he began renovating a brownstone for himself at 139 East 19th Street. The house was poorly designed, from an awkward floor plan to a boring and common design. He replanned the interior, removed the stoop, and covered the dark brownstone with a cream-colored stucco. In his backyard he added a fountain, arbor, and vines, creating what was described as a "fairy-like grotto". It was the first time those kind of changes had been made in New York City, and other rebuilders began renovating brownstones on the block. They added Arts and Crafts tile work, tinted stucco, flower boxes, and iron balconies. He has since been deemed "one of the city's most innovative architects" by The New York Times. He later renovated two other houses for himself, and sparked renovations in those areas as well. He was lauded for his renovations of brownstones in the Gramercy Park neighborhood. The Landmarks Preservation Commission included the 19th Street block in the Gramercy Park Historic District in 1966, but without mentioning Sterner and treated the block of buildings as a generic grouping.

In addition to his work renovating brownstones, Sterner continued to design new homes, such as for one of the Singer Sewing Machine heirs and descendants of the Astor family. He also designed country homes on Long Island. Sterner designed the Greenbrier Hotel in White Sulphur Springs, West Virginia. He employed the New York architect Rosario Candela, who later designed luxury buildings on Park Avenue.

== Personal life ==
In 1910, Sterner and his sister, who were both single, lived together. She was an interior designer who worked on one of Sterner's buildings Greenbrier Hotel in White Sulphur Springs, West Virginia. In 1915, he moved to 154 East 63rd Street and then in 1918 to 150 East 62nd Street, renovating his houses and sparking renovation in the area. He moved to what he called "Parge House" at 65th and Lexington in 1922. George H. Shorey found Sterner's renovation of the house to be "as enthralling as gypsy music" and wrote in a 1924 review in International Studio magazine, "It is a sluggish imagination that cannot be captivated by pink and scarlet geraniums against gray stucco, or solid green shutters against a background of red, with well-watered window boxes ambuscading small-paned windows."

In 1924, he and his sister moved to London. She was married in 1926, but Sterner never married. She was with him when he died in 1931 in Rome.

== Works ==
This is an example of Sterner's works, some of which are listed on the National Register of Historic Places (NRHP).

Property	Image	Year	Location	Architect / Firm	NRHP Listed
Briarhurst		1888	Manitou Springs	Varian & Sterner	yes
Denver Athletic Club		1889	Denver	Sterner	yes
Highland School		1891 or 1892	Boulder	Varian and Sterner	yes
St. Elizabeth's Retreat Chapel		1894	Denver	Sterner	yes
Tears–McFarlane House		1899	Denver	Sterner	yes
Lennox House		1900	Colorado Springs	Sterner	yes
Pearce–McAllister Cottage		1900	Denver	Sterner	yes
Glen Eyrie		1901 consolidation design	Colorado Springs	Sterner	yes
Minnequa Steel Works Office; Building and Dispensary		1901	Pueblo	Sterner	yes
La Hacienda		1902	Buffalo Creek	Sterner	yes
Daniels & Fisher Tower		1910	Denver	Sterner and Williamson	yes
The Stephen Carlton Clark Mansion		August 19,1911	46 East 70th Street, New York, Currently The Explorers Club	Sterner	no
Greenbrier Hotel		1913	White Sulphur Springs, West Virginia	Sterner	yes
Barbara Rutherford Hatch House		1917–1919	153 East 63rd Street; New York City, New York	Sterner	yes
William Ziegler House		1920	2 East 63rd Street; New York City, New York	Sterner	no
