= Central City Opera House =

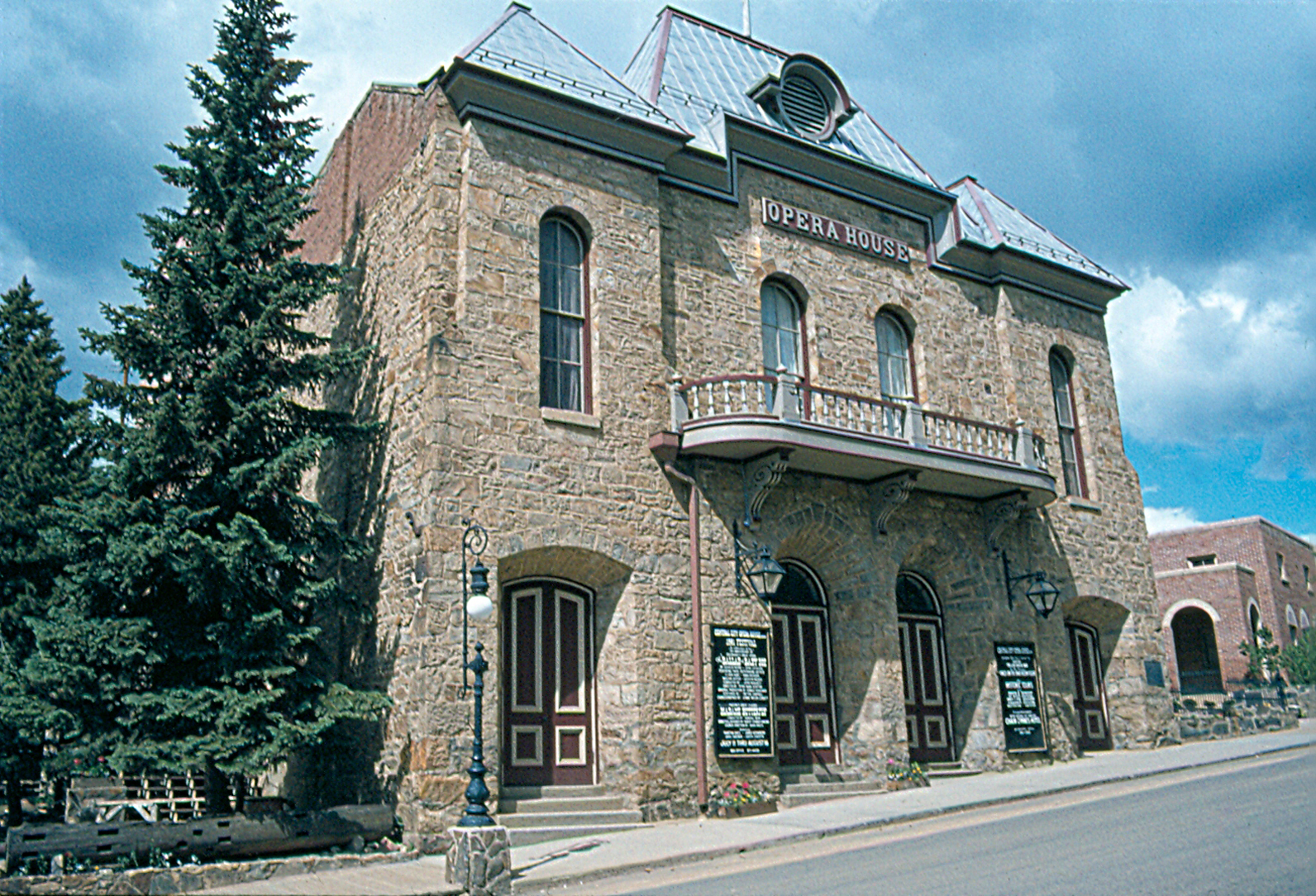
- The Opera House in 1982

- Location within Colorado Location within the United States
- Address: 124 Eureka St; Central City, Colorado; United States
- Coordinates: 39°48′4″N 105°30′47″W
- Owner: Central City Opera

Construction
- Opened: 1878
- Central City Opera House
- U.S. National Register of Historic Places
- Area: 1 acre (0.40 ha)
- Architectural style: Renaissance Revival
- NRHP reference No.: 73000474
- Added to NRHP: January 18, 1973

The Central City Opera House is located in the Central City/Black Hawk Historic District in Central City, Colorado, United States. It was constructed in 1878. It has offered operatic and theatrical productions that drew prominent actors and performers in the late 19th-century, and in the early 20th-century it was a motion picture theater.

The opera house was designated to the National Register of Historic Places in 1973. (Note: There are some sources that state that the opera house was made a National Historic Landmark in 1973. It is the entire Central City/Black Hawk Historic District that is on the list of National Historic Landmarks in Colorado.)

== Construction and subsequent renovations ==
In 1877, the citizens of Central City formed the Gilpin County Opera House Association to fundraise for the state's first opera house. Denver architect Robert S. Roeschlaub designed the Renaissance Revival stone and brick structure, with a crescent-shaped balcony and arched windows. San Francisco artist John C. Massman painted a mural to the ceiling with a central medallion that features the sky, surrounded by a large geometrical patter, and trompe-l'œil architectural moldings.

It was built by Welsh and Cornish miners and town residents, who had a tradition of music. The opera house is kept cool during the summer by a creek flows that through a flume under the building. Electricity was installed in 1896 and it was renovated, without structural changes, in 1903.

In 1929 a dedicated band of Denver preservationists and music lovers formed the Central City Opera House Association to perform a renovation and re-open the opera house. It was a volunteer-driven effort led by Ida Kruse McFarlane, Edna Chappell and Anne Evans that resulted in an extensive restoration of the Opera House in 1932. In the 1980s and 1990s, the entire structure was restored, including the foundation and replacement of the 1920-era lighting relic by a computerized lighting system. In 1999, wooden chairs were replaced with plush new theater seating.

== Productions and cinema ==
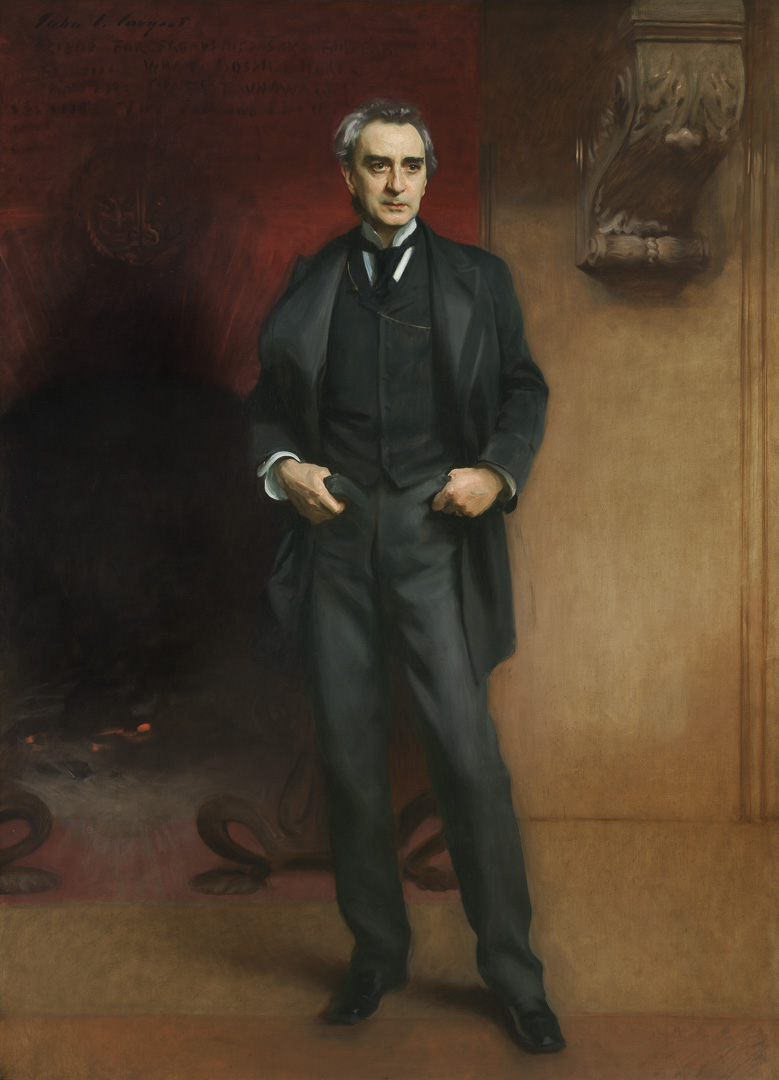
Portrait of Edwin Booth by John Singer Sargent, 1890, which hung at The Players clubhouse. Now in the collection of the Amon Carter Museum of American Art.

With the 1878 grand opening, Central City was Colorado's cultural capital until another opera house, Tabor Grand Opera House, opened in 1881. The Opera House was not turning a profit and it expanded its repertoire to include theater productions to increase its revenues. They featured prominent 19th-century actors such as Joseph Jefferson, Edwin Booth, Madame Januschek and Fannie Barlow. In addition, Buffalo Bill performed here as well as P. T. Barnum's circus.

Peter MacFarlane, who was a contractor for the original construction and the contractor for the 1903 renovation, became the principal owner of the Opera House by 1910, when he opened it as a motion picture theater. The Opera House closed in 1927.

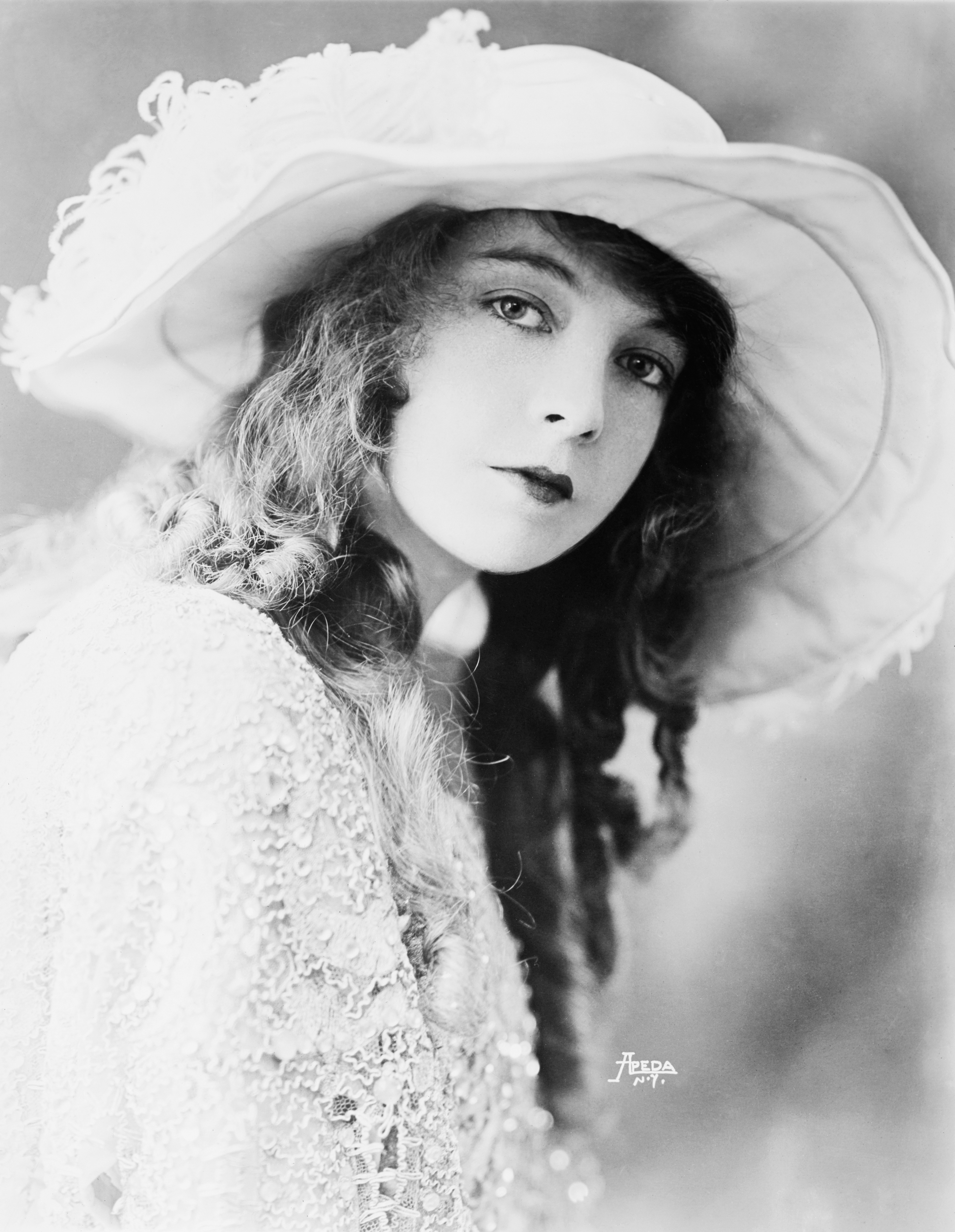
Lillian Gish, 1921

The opera house was donated to the University of Denver in May 1931 by MacFarlane's heirs and restoration was organized by the newly formed Central City Opera House Association. The summer of 1932, actress Lillian Gish opened the newly restored opera house with Camille. It began a tradition of offering summer opera and theater festivals, which have become nationally recognized.

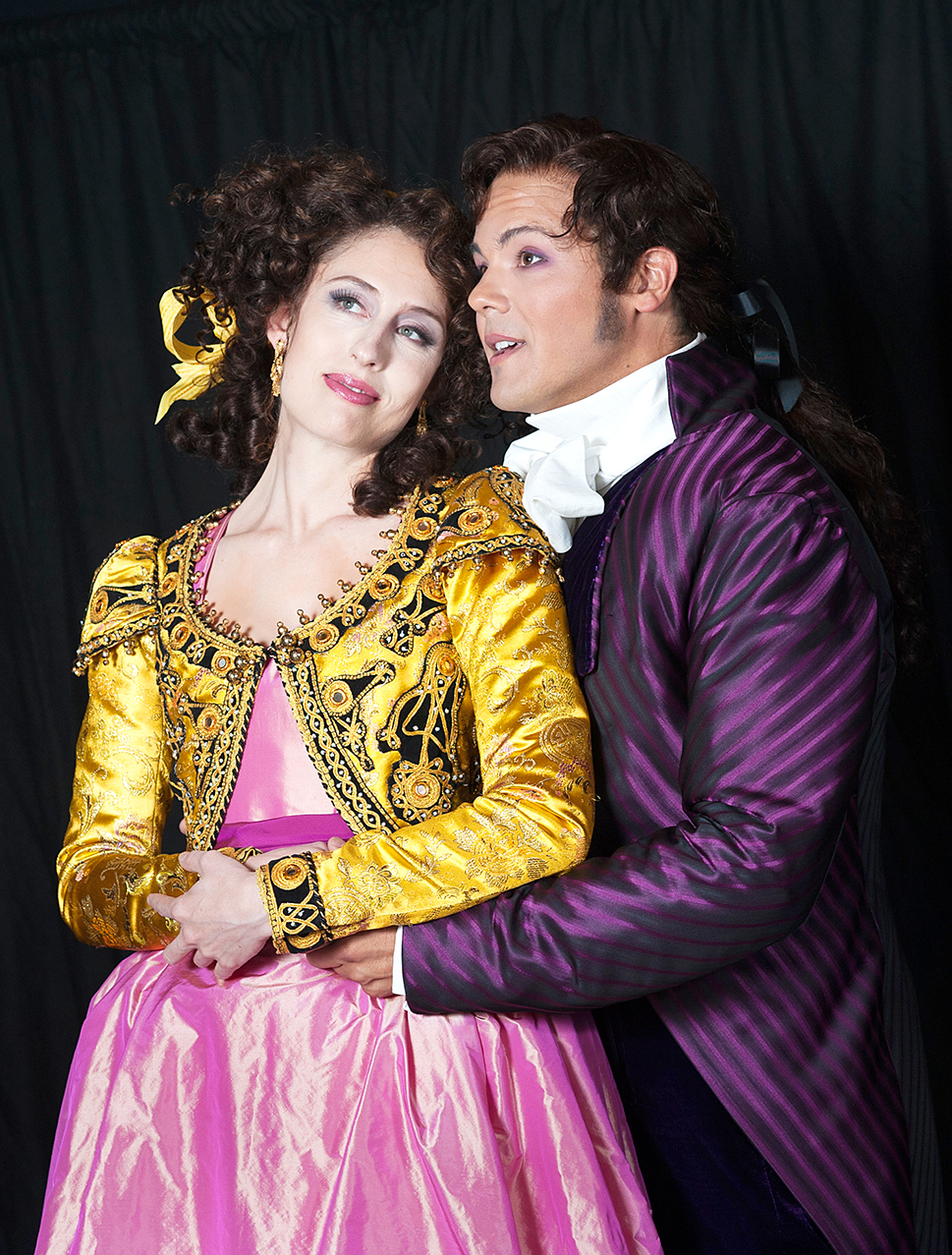
Gioachino Rossini's The Barber of Seville, performed by the Central City Opera November 14 - December 5, 2015

The Central City Opera company was also formed that year. It is the fifth oldest opera company in the United States. One of its popular performances is The Ballad of Baby Doe, which tells the story of wealthy mine-owner Horace Tabor and his second wife Baby Doe Tabor. It was first performed in 1956. In 2001, it was the first opera company in the United States to produce Gloriana of Elizabeth I by Benjamin Britten. Gioachino Rossini's The Barber of Seville was performed by the Central City Opera in 2015.

Samuel Ramey and Beverly Sills have performed at the opera house. It was noted by Daniel Rule, who managed the Central City Opera company, that 29 of the performers of the Metropolitan Opera in New York had performed at Central City. The Central City Opera House Association owns 30 Victorian houses in town that are used during the summer to board singers who perform at the opera house. Up until 2000 all of the operas were performed in English. Central City Opera now performs all of its operas in their original languages.

The opera house continues to offer several operatic productions each summer and screenings of silent and classic films.

== Popular culture ==
It was a film location for the movie The Duchess and the Dirtwater Fox starring Goldie Hawn and George Segal.

It was also referenced in chapter 9 of On the Road by Jack Kerouac, mentioning the opera Fidelio and interactions with the performers in a wild night in Central City as the western opera world intersected with the Beat Generation.

== See also ==
- National Register of Historic Places listings in Gilpin County, Colorado
