= Levette J. Davidson =

Levette J. Davidson was a nationally acclaimed expert in folklore, especially that of Colorado and the West. He wrote with authority on mining terms in Colorado.

== Early life ==
Levette J. Davidson was born in Eureka, Illinois May 16, 1894, one of four children. Because his grand uncle was past-President of Eureka College, a Christian seminary, Davidson was reared in the school's shadow with the option of becoming either a teacher or a preacher. He chose teaching and was awarded his B.A. from Eureka in 1915. A year later he received his A.M. degree from the University of Illinois where he received Phi Beta Kappa honors. In 1917, he earned his M.A. in social science and history at Harvard University. __During World War I, he served with the Tenth Infantry of the Forty-Sixth Division and also served as an army sergeant in Intelligence. Davidson and his wife Mary, also a graduate of Eureka, were married in 1918. At the end of the war, Davidson simultaneously taught and studied at the University of Michigan where he earned a Ph.D. in languages and literatures in 1922.

== Career ==
After earning his Ph.D. in 1922, he arrived in Denverand began teaching at the University of Denver. Before arriving in Colorado, his academic specialty was eighteenth century England. Once there, he realized that Western literature and folklore would be his life work. Davidson taught at the University of Denver until his death in 1957. His course topics ranged from studies of Shakespeare and other English literature, to folklore in the West. He began teaching news writing and eventually founded the journalism department at the university as well as the board of publications and the press club. He was the first faculty member elected to serve as president of the University Senate. In 1940 he became head of the English Department and from March to August 1953 he served as interim Chancellor. At the time of assuming his post, he remarked: There is hardly an organization on campus that I have not been connected with at one time or another. Davidson was named University Lecturer for 1956.

Davidson was a director of the Colorado State Historical Society, the Modern Languages Association, the American Folklore Society, and the American Dialect Society. He was a charter member of the Denver Posse of the Westerners, an organization devoted to western folklore. In spare moments, Davidson conducted research, wrote outlines for plays, and authored a large number of articles. He contributed to a wide range of magazines from Western American to Shakespeare Quarterly. Additionally, Davidson authored several books on folklore. The most widely recognized is Rocky Mountain Tales, which presents regional folklore as well as true accounts of early events in the area.

== Death ==
Levette Davidson died May 14, 1957.
