= Andrew and Jennie McFarlane House =

Historic house in Pennsylvania, United States

- U.S. National Register of Historic Places
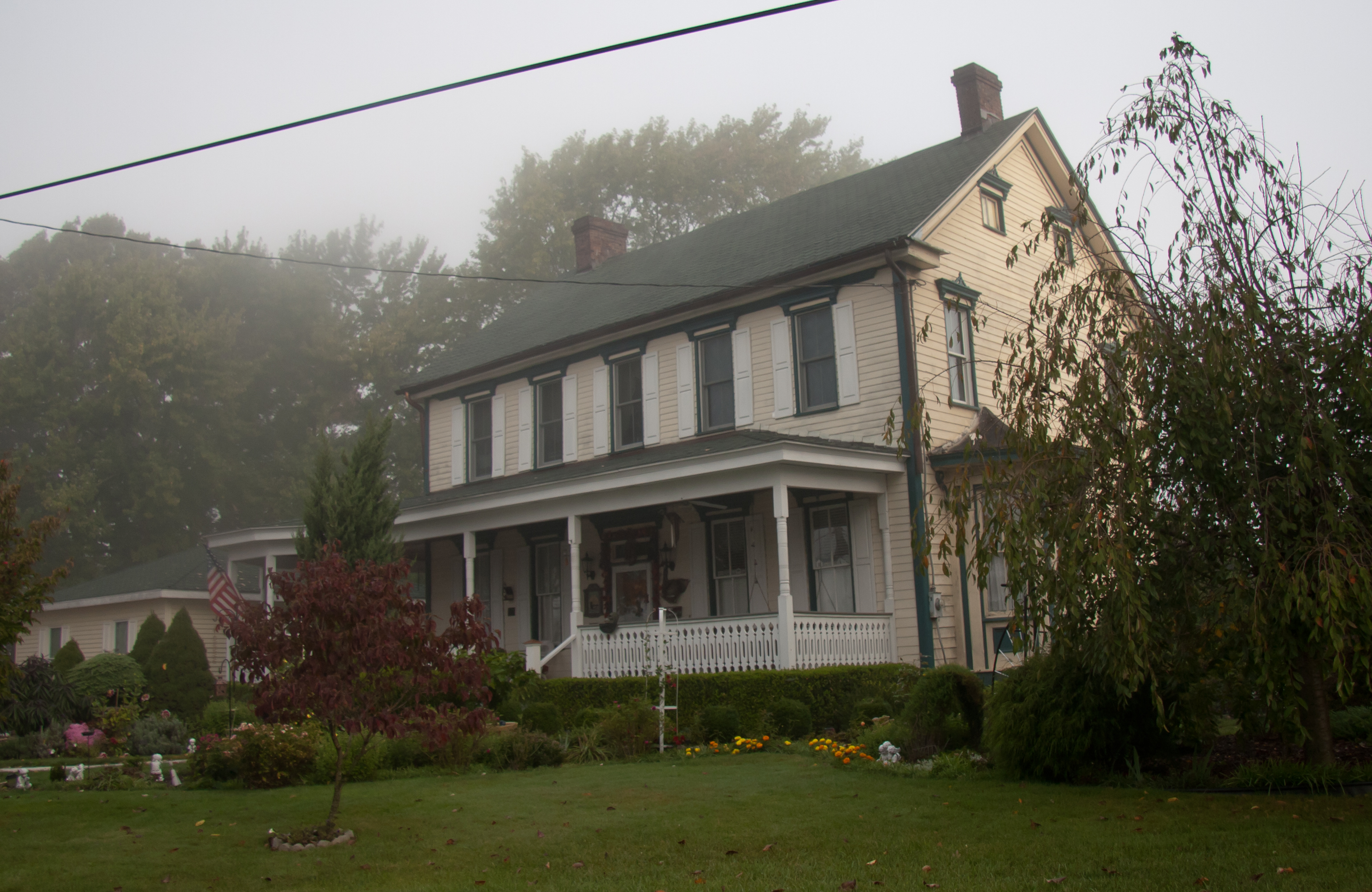

- Location within Pennsylvania Location within the United States
- Location: 50 Maus Dr., west of Irwin, North Huntingdon Township, Pennsylvania
- Coordinates: 40°19′47″N 79°44′21″W
- Area: less than one acre
- Built: c. 1790-1798, 1870
- Architectural style: Italianate
- NRHP reference No.: 04000807
- Added to NRHP: August 4, 2004

Andrew and Jennie McFarlane House, also known as the William Larimer, Sr. House, is a historic home located in North Huntingdon Township, Westmoreland County, Pennsylvania. It is a 2 1/2-story, L-shaped, log and frame dwelling with cedar siding. The original log section was built between 1790 and 1798. It has a rear wood-frame addition built in 1870. At the same time, the house was renovated in the Italianate style. A wraparound porch was added in 1989.

It was added to the National Register of Historic Places in 2004.
