= Royal Baking Powder Company =

American baking powder company

The Royal Baking Powder Company was one of the largest producers of baking powder in the United States. Royal Baking Powder is still marketed today.

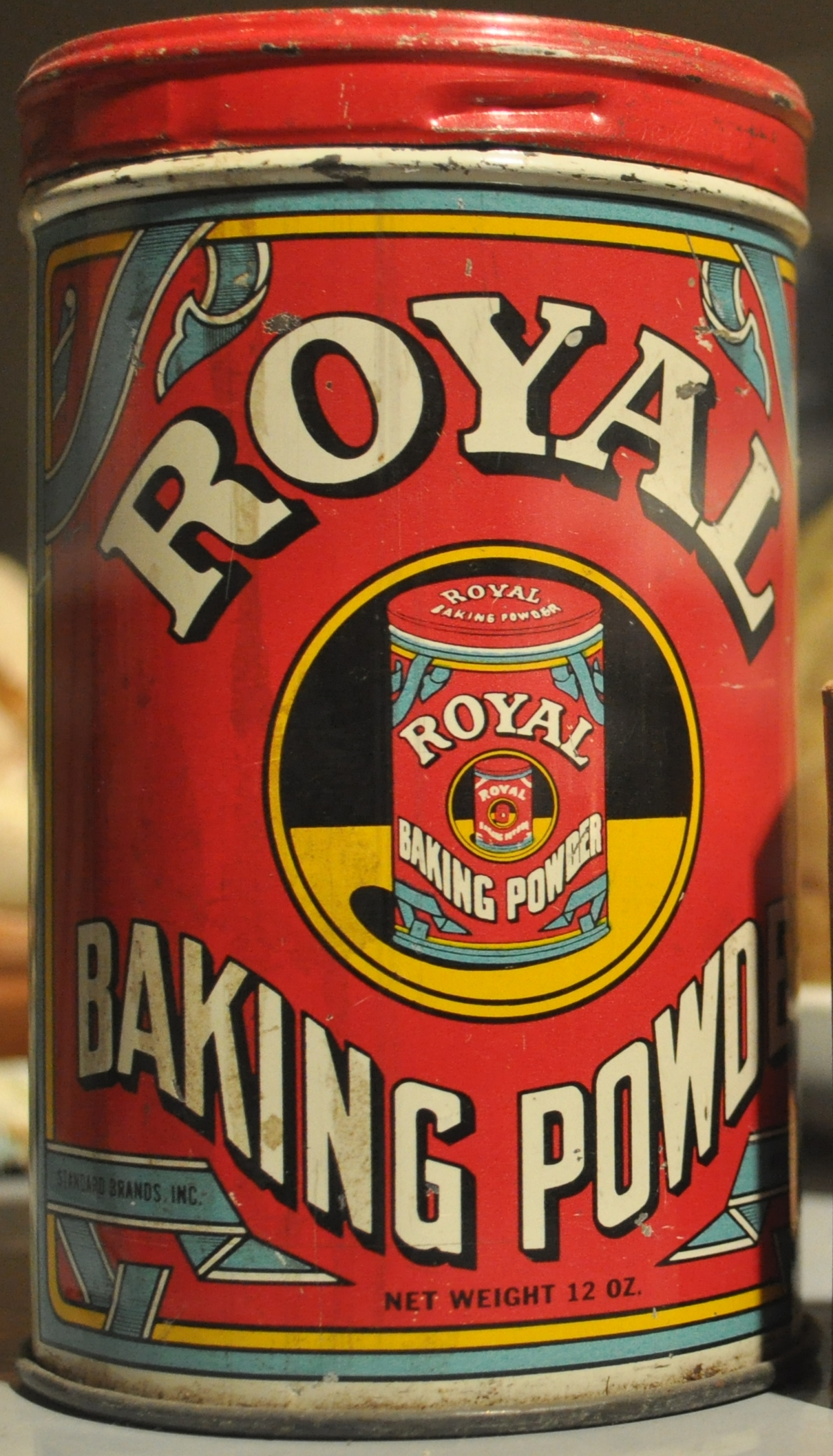
Royal Baking Powder, early to mid 20th century

== History ==
The company was started by brothers Joseph Christoffel Hoagland and Cornelius Nevius Hoagland in 1866, It later came under the ownership of William Ziegler, and then his adopted son, William Ziegler Jr.

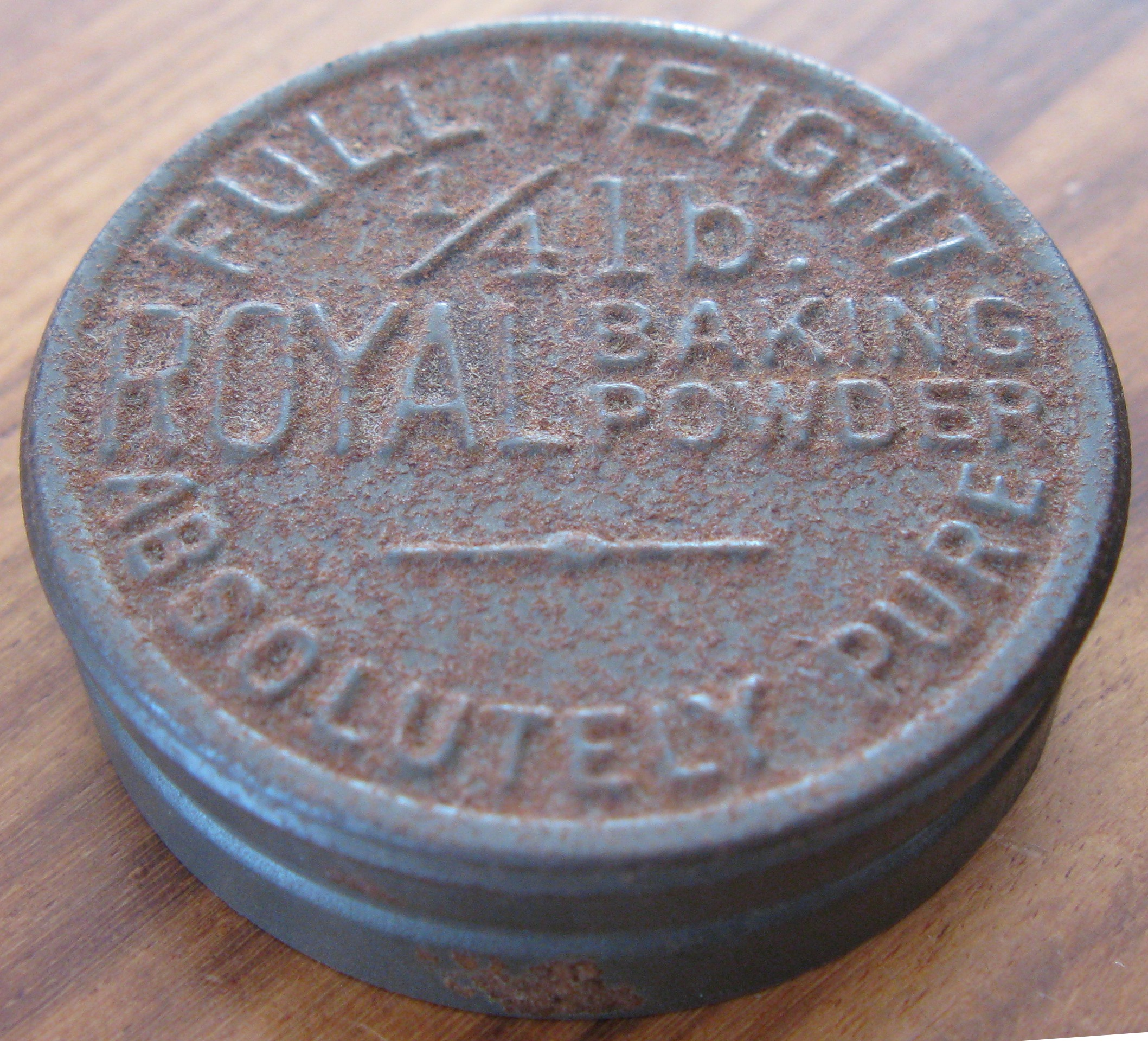
Lid of Royal Baking Powder tin, in historical perspective, probably late 19th century. It had been among the effects of a South African soldier killed in World War I. About 50 mm (2.0 in) in diameter, from a tin about 100 mm (3.9 in) deep.

In 1929, the Royal Baking Powder Co., along with four other companies including the Fleischmann's Yeast Company, merged to form Standard Brands, the number-two brand of packaged foods in America after General Foods. Through a further merger, Standard Brands itself became part of Nabisco in 1981. In 2012, Nabisco became a subsidiary of Mondelez International.
