= Ida Kruse McFarlane =

British professor

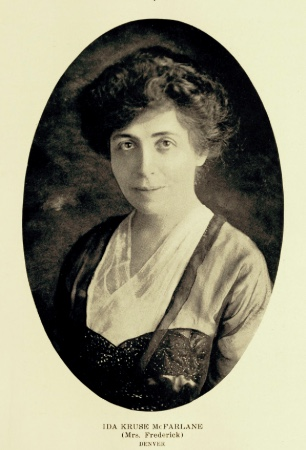
Ida Kruse McFarlane, Representative Women of Colorado, 1914

Ida Kruse McFarlane (1872-1940) was an English professor and head of the English department at the University of Denver. In 1931, she negotiated to have the Central City Opera House donated to the university.

== Early life and education ==
Ida Kruse was born in Central City - Black Hawk area in 1872. (Note: There are some sources that say that she was born in 1873, but she was born in 1872 (eight years old in 1880).) Her parents were Frederick and Letta Kruse. She had a sister, Clara, and a brother named Frederick. Her father was the major of Central City, where she grew up and attended a convent school, St. Aloysius.

McFarlane received her Bachelor of Arts and Masters of Arts degrees from Vassar College and studied in Europe at various universities. She received an honorary Doctorate of Literature from the University of Denver in 1914.

== Career ==
She began her work career as Ida Kruse and around 1907 she married Frederick McFarlane, a mining manufacturer who was born and educated in Central City. Between 1903 and 1907, McFarlane was Superintendent of schools for Gilpin County, Colorado.

She taught English during the 1905-1906 summer interim at the University of Denver and formally joined the university's English faculty in 1907. She taught English literature and served as head of the English Department until her death in 1940. She taught modern poetry, drama, the French language, Spanish literature, and phonetics. She was particularly interested in the works of Ezra Pound, Carl Sandburg, and T. S. Eliot. She offered and taught courses in manners and, with a colleague, created seven courses on efficiency, called Scientific Management in 1914. The area of knowledge was led by the works of Frank and Lillian Gilbreth and Frederick Winslow Taylor.

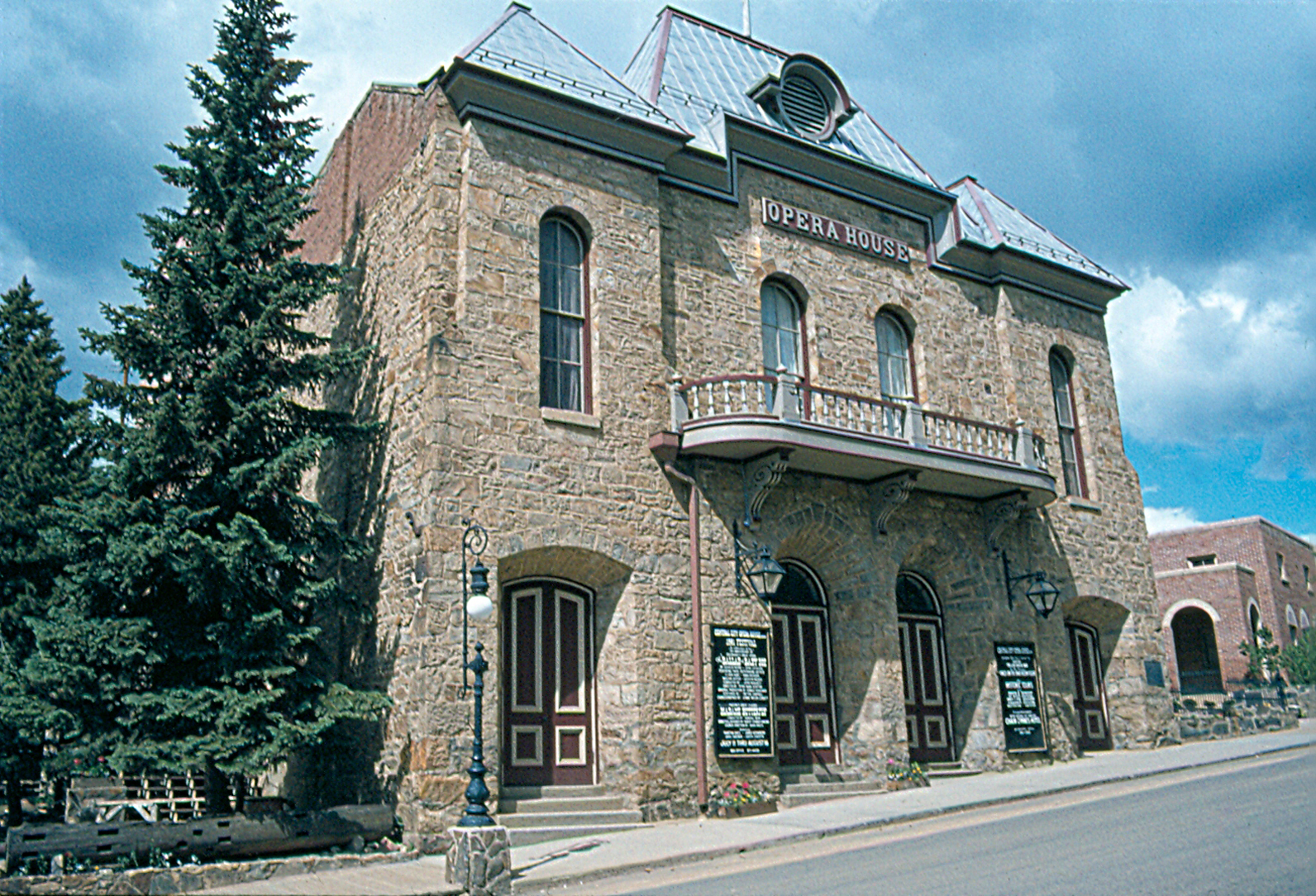
Central City Opera House

In 1931, she negotiated for the donation of the Central City Opera House to the University of Denver, with Peter McFarlane and the heirs of the opera house. It was a logical choice based upon the university's affiliation with the Civic Theater and its tax-exempt status. She had the support of philanthropist Anne Evans, the daughter of Governor John Evans. The building was renovated and opened in 1932 and began a tradition of the Central City Summer Festival.

She gave public lecturers about literature and art by 1914. In 1919, she published Modern Culture, the Arts of the Theatre, a compilation of her lectures. With Melicent Van Riper, she co-authored The Glory that was Gold: The Central City Opera House.

== Personal life ==
In 1937, McFarlane and her husband bought the Georgian-style house (1898) built by railroad attorney Daniel W. Tears. It is listed on the National Register of Historic Places as the Tears–McFarlane House. She died on June 18, 1940.

== Legacy ==
External images
- Ida Kruse McFarlane memorial, Central City
- Johnson-MacFarlane Residential Hall

- In 1944, a monument was built in Central City in her honor, at the initial suggestion of Anne Evans. A fund for the monument was raised by Clarence H. Adams, who at the time was the president of the International Trust Company.
- Due to her dedication to the university, the Johnson-McFarlane Residential Hall was partially named after her.
