= St. Elizabeth's Retreat Chapel =

Historic Catholic chapel in Denver

- U.S. National Register of Historic Places
- Colorado State Register of Historic Properties
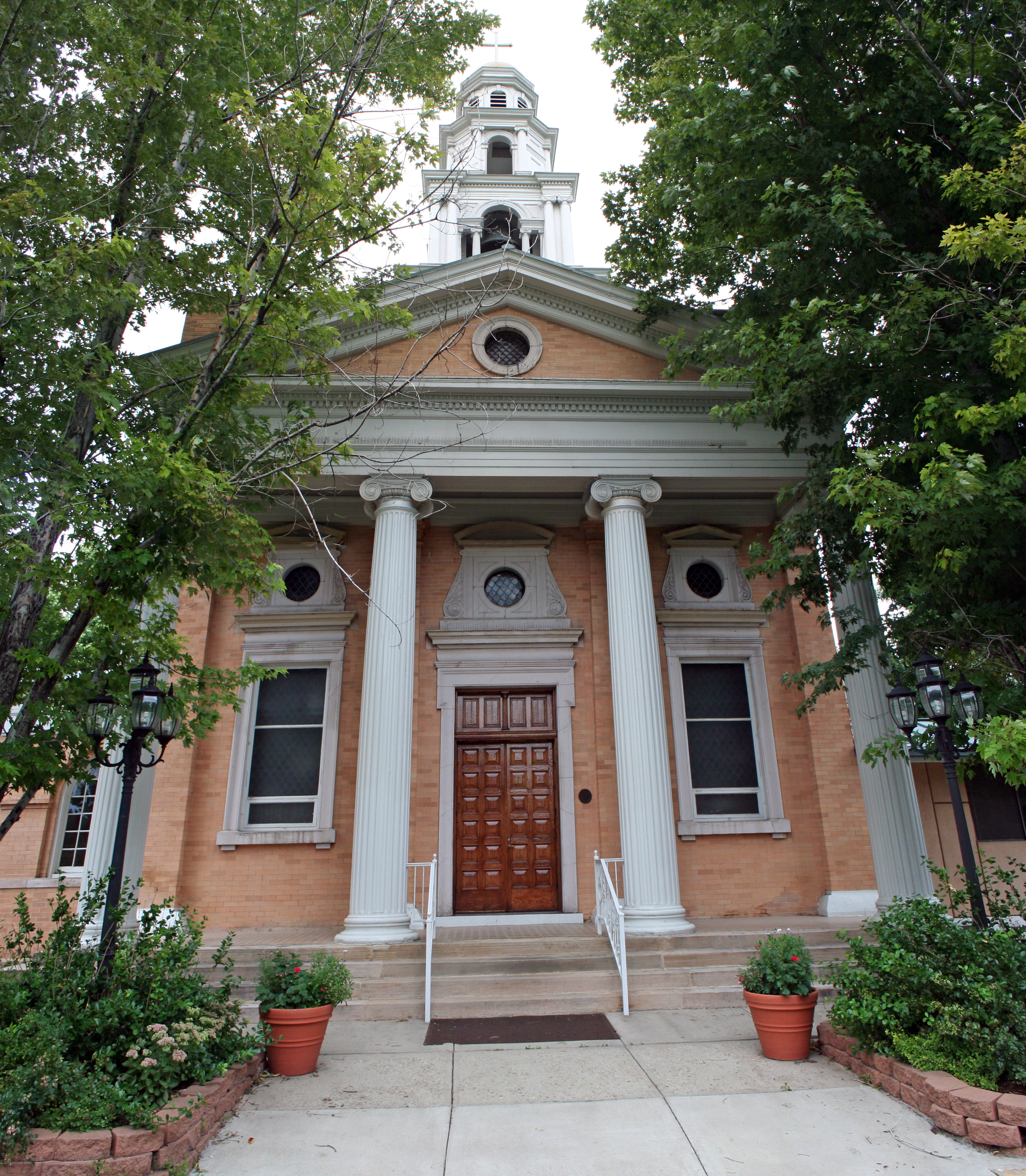

- Location within Colorado Location within the United States
- Location: 2825 W. 32nd Ave., Denver, Colorado
- Coordinates: 39°45′46″N 105°1′19″W
- Area: less than one acre
- Built: 1894
- Architect: Frederick G. Sterner
- Architectural style: Georgian
- NRHP reference No.: 76000556
- CSRHP No.: 5DV.129
- Added to NRHP: May 24, 1976

St. Elizabeth's Retreat Chapel is a historic Catholic chapel at 2825 W. 32nd Avenue in Denver, Colorado, United States. It was built in 1894 and was added to the National Register of Historic Places in 1976.

It was designed by architect Frederick G. Sterner and has an apsidal plan.
