= William Ziegler (industrialist) =

American industrialist

William Ziegler Sr.
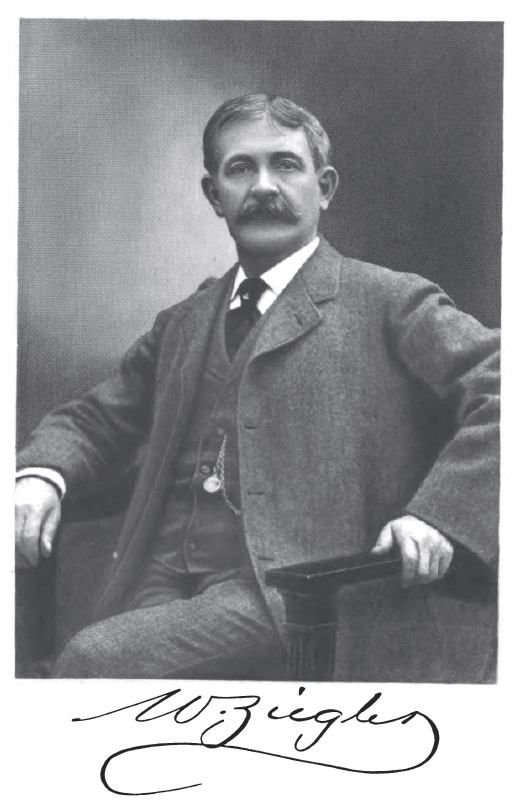
- Born: September 1, 1843; Beaver County, Pennsylvania
- Died: May 25, 1905 (aged 61); Great Island, Darien, Connecticut
- Education: Eastman Business School
- Occupation: Industrialist
- Spouse: Electa Matilda Gamble (m. 1886)

William Ziegler Sr. (September 1, 1843 – May 25, 1905) was an American industrialist who was one of the founding investors of the Royal Baking Powder Company. With his wealth, Ziegler became a prominent public-interest litigant. His other interests were organizing Arctic expeditions and yachting.

== Biography ==
He was born in Beaver County, Pennsylvania, of German parents. His father, Francis Ziegler, died in 1846, and in 1848 his mother, Ernestine Ziegler, married Conrad Brandt. The family moved to Muscatine, Iowa, where his stepfather had a farm. He was educated in the public schools there and became a printer's apprentice in a newspaper office. He later became a clerk in a drug store and studied telegraphy and chemistry. In 1862, he enrolled in the Eastman Business School in Poughkeepsie, New York. After he completed his course there, he went to New York City where he worked for a wholesale drug and chemical company from 1863 to 1868. At the same time he took a course at the College of Pharmacy.

=== Royal Baking Powder ===
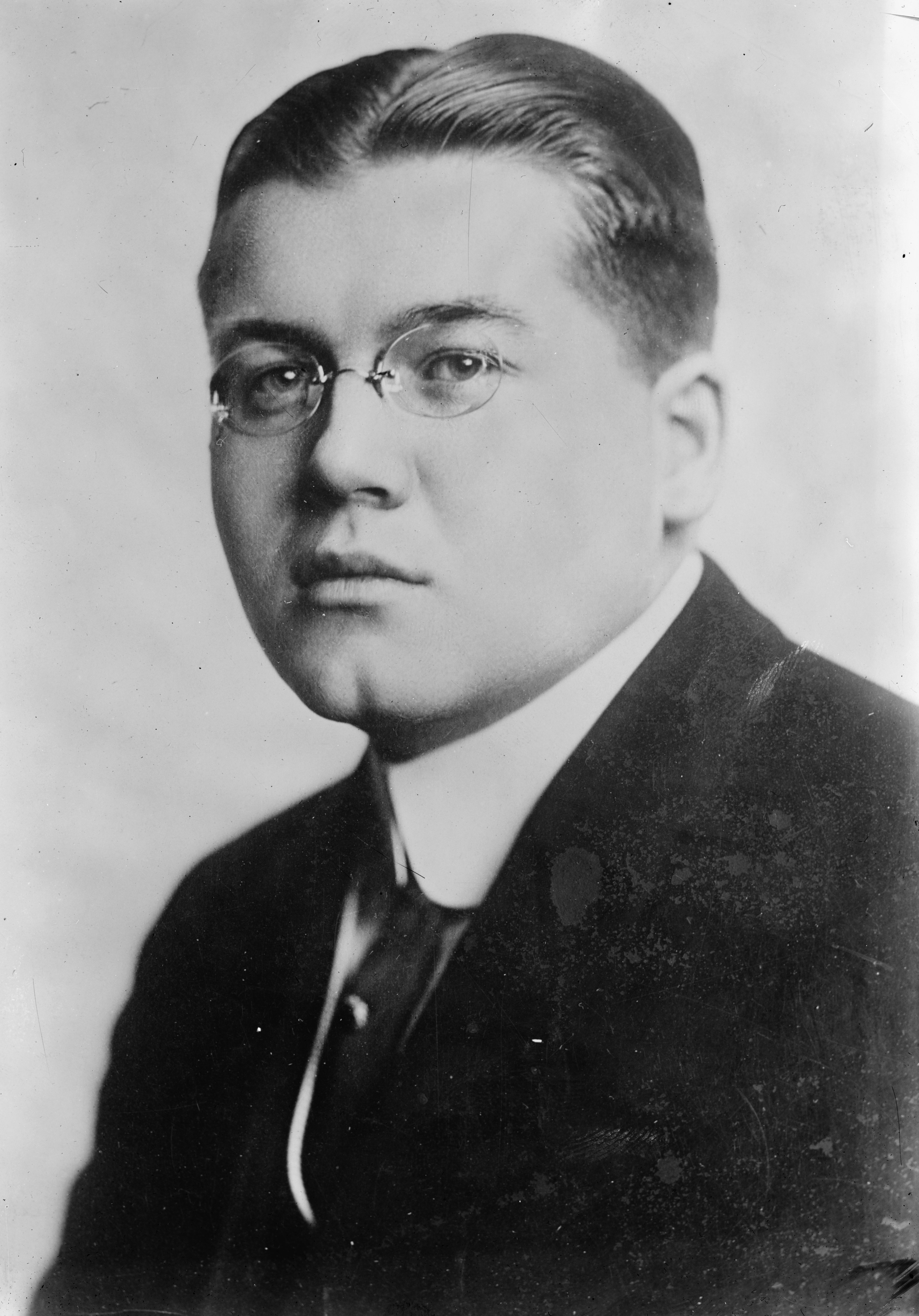
William Ziegler Jr. (1891-1958), nephew and adopted son of Ziegler

In 1866 Joseph Christoffel Hoagland, his brother Cornelius Nevius Hoagland and Thomas Biddle organized the Royal Chemical Company, which later became the Royal Baking Powder Company. In 1868 they moved to New York, where John H. Seal and William Ziegler became agents of the company and later shareholders. In 1888 Ziegler sold his shares for $4,000,000. With the proceeds of the sale he bought the Price Baking Powder Company of Chicago and the Tartar Chemical Company in Jersey City, New Jersey. On March 2, 1899, he combined the three major baking powder companies, Dr. Price (Ziegler), Royal (Joseph Hoagland) and Cleveland (Cornelius Nevius Hoagland), into the Royal Baking Powder Corporation of New Jersey.

=== Litigant ===
Ziegler is remembered as the public-spirited plaintiff in a tax-payers' suit to prevent a "deal" between the Long Island Water Company and the City of Brooklyn. This suit was conducted successfully at an expense of about $100,000 and saved nearly $1,500,000 to the people of Brooklyn. A similar taxpayers' suit brought by him compelled the Brooklyn Elevated Railroad to pay nearly $500,000 in taxes to the city. Another notable suit was brought by him as a minority stockholder of the Lake Street Elevated Railroad of Chicago. It resulted in his securing $1,000,000 damages, and in setting a most important legal precedent.

=== Arctic expeditions ===
In 1901, Ziegler became interested in polar research and fitted out his first expedition, consisting of the three ships, America, Frithjof and Belgica, which he placed in charge of Evelyn Briggs Baldwin. Mr. Ziegler's main objective was to plant the American flag on the North Pole. The next spring, Mr. Ziegler sent out his private secretary, William S. Champ, in charge of a relief expedition on the ship Frithjof. Baldwin's differences with his sailing master, Johanson, were followed by his recall. Upon the explorer's arrival in the United States, it was announced that all relations between him and Ziegler were off. The third expedition fitted out by Mr. Ziegler, and which was still in the Arctic regions at the time of his death, was sent out in the summer of 1903 under the command of Anthony Fiala and Captain Edward Coffin of Edgartown, Massachusetts.

=== Indictment for bribery ===
In January 1902, Ziegler was indicted for bribery in connection with the baking powder scandal in the Missouri Legislature. Governor Odeil declined to honor the requisition issued by Governor Dockery, and Ziegler was never tried on the indictment. He declared he could prove an alibi, and that Baldwin had instigated the charge. As noted in an expose by muckraker Lincoln Steffens, "while Attourney-General Crow charges Ziegler with bribery out there, all I can prove is that bribes were paid in the interest of Royal [Baking Powder Corporation] [...] Ziegler becomes a mere shadow. Corrupt Royal agents do the work."

=== Yachting ===
Ziegler at one time owned a sloop yacht named Thistle, which was entered in the race for the Kaiser's Cup. On one of his yachting expeditions to the South in April, 1895, he was reported drowned. In three days he turned up. Grief over his reported death, it was said at the time, killed John G. Demorest, his brother-in-law.

=== Marriage ===
In August 1886, at the age of forty-three, Ziegler married Electa Matilda Gamble of New York. He was a Director of the Irving National Bank, and a member of the following clubs: Down-Town Club of New York, the Union League Club of Brooklyn, the New York, Larchmont, and Atlantic Yacht clubs, the Union League Club of Chicago, the Metropolitan Museum of Art, the American Geographical Society, the Arctic Club of New York, and the Caughnawaga Hunting and Fishing Club of Quebec. He was a Mason and a Knight Templar.

=== Death ===
He died on May 25, 1905. Ziegler was interred in Woodlawn Cemetery in The Bronx, New York City. The following is part of the obituary which appeared in the New York Times:

William Ziegler died at his summer home, on Great Island, Darien, Conn., at 6:45 o'clock this morning. The direct cause of death was apoplexy. He never had fully recovered from injuries sustained in a runaway accident last October, and to this was added worry over a serious accident to his adopted son six weeks ago. Mr. Ziegler suffered a stroke last Sunday, and on Monday night Dr. Avery, the attending physician, gave up hope. The son, who is thirteen years old, will not be able to attend the funeral because of his injuries. Mr. Ziegler's secretary, Mr. Champ, who is at Tromsø, Norway, was notified by cable of Mr. Ziegler's death. He is in charge of the relief expedition sent out in search of Anthony Fiala. It was stated positively to night that he would sail for the Arctic regions early in June. Mr. Ziegler's funeral will be held on Saturday at noon at the residence on Great Island. The Rev. L. M. French, rector of St. Luke's Church, Noroton, will officiate. Entombment in the Ziegler mausoleum, at Woodlawn, will follow. Special cars will be attached to the train leaving New York at 10:04 Saturday morning for the New York friends. A special train will carry the mourners from Noroton to Woodlawn. William Ziegler, who sent, at his own expense, three large expeditions to find and plant the American flag at the North Pole, devoting a larger sum to the cause of Arctic exploration than any other man in the world, began life as a printer's apprentice. At his death, it is estimated, he was worth more than $10,000,000. Mr. Ziegler was sixty-two years old.

His widow died in 1932.
