= Plumb (surname) =

The surname Plumb may refer to:

- Alvin Plumb (1802–?), American businessman and politician
- Caroline Plumb (born 1978), British entrepreneur and businesswoman
- Charles Plumb (bishop) (1864–1930), British Anglican bishop
- Charles Plumb (cartoonist) (1899–1982), American cartoonist known for drawing the strip Ella Cinders
- Dick Plumb (born 1946), English footballer
- Edward H. Plumb (1907–1958), American film composer and orchestrator best known for his work at Walt Disney Studios
- Eve Plumb (born 1958), American actress and painter
- Fawcett Plumb (1834–1919), American banker and politician
- Glenn E. Plumb (1866–1922), American lawyer who proposed the Plumb Plan to retain government control of the railroads after the end of World War I
- Gwen Plumb (1912–2002), Australian actress
- Helga Plumb (born 1939), Austrian-born Canadian architect
- Henry Plumb, Baron Plumb (1925–2022), British politician
- James Plumb (fl. 1917–1920), American politician
- Jennifer Plumb, American 21st century politician
- John Plumb (disambiguation), several people
- Josiah Burr Plumb (1816–1888), Canadian politician
- Levancia Holcomb Plumb (1841–1923), American bank president and temperance reformer
- Lois Plumb (1924–2002), Canadian psychiatrist
- Michael Plumb (born 1940), American equestrian and Olympic champion
- Mimi Plumb (born 1953), American art photographer and educator
- Neely Plumb (1912–2000), American musician and record producer
- Phillip Plumb (born 1958), former Australian rules footballer
- Preston B. Plumb (1837–1891), American senator from Kansas and Civil War lieutenant colonel
- Ralph Plumb (1816–1903), American politician
- Ron Plumb (born 1950), Canadian former ice hockey defenceman
- Rovana Plumb (born 1960), Romanian politician
- Stephen Plumb (born 1954), English former cricketer
- Thomas Plumb (1833–1905), English first-class cricketer
- Vivienne Plumb (born 1955), New Zealand poet, playwright, fiction writer and editor

== See also ==
- Plumb (singer) (born 1975), American Christian musician
- Plumbe (disambiguation)
