= Pluma =

Pluma (Latin: plūma "feather") may refer to:

== Places ==
- Pluma Hidalgo, a town and municipality in Oaxaca, Mexico
- Pluma de Pato, a village and rural municipality in Salta, Argentina

== Science ==
- Pluma (fish), a name in the West Indies of a fish, Calamus calamus
- Pluma (meat), a cut of Iberian pork
- Pluma (text editor), small and lightweight UTF-8 text editor for the MATE environment
- Pluma porgy, an ocean-going fish of the family Sparidae, Calamus pennatula

== Other uses ==
- Peso pluma, a weight class division in fighting sports

== See also ==
- Plumas (disambiguation)
- Bluma (disambiguation)
- Plume (disambiguation)
- La Plume (disambiguation)
