= Porgi grunt =

Porgi grunt is an English common name used in Jamaica for several species of fish such as:

- Saucereye porgy (Calamus calamus)
- Jolthead porgy (Calamus bojanado)
