= Plume =

Plume or plumes may refer to:

== Science ==
- Plume (feather), a prominent bird feather
- Plume (fluid dynamics), a column consisting of one fluid moving through another fluid
- Eruption plume, a column of volcanic ash and gas emitted into the atmosphere during an eruption
- Mantle plume, an upwelling of hot rock within the Earth's mantle that can cause volcanic hotspots
- Moisture plume, an alternative name for an atmospheric river, a narrow corridor of concentrated moisture in the atmosphere
- Plumage, the layer of feathers that cover a bird
- Toilet plume, the aerosolized excreta resulting from the flush of a toilet, especially an uncovered one

== Media and literature ==
- "Plume" (Air episode), 2005 episode of the Japanese anime Air
- Plume (Loscil album), 2006
- Plumes (play), a 1927 one-act play by Georgia Douglas Johnson
- Plume (poetry collection), a 2012 book by Kathleen Flenniken
- Plume (publisher), an American book publishing company
- Plumes, a 1924 novel by Laurence Stallings
- A song by The Smashing Pumpkins on their 1994 album Pisces Iscariot
- Plume (EP), 2018 EP by Irama
- "Plume", song by Caravan Palace on the 2019 album Chronologic

== People ==
- Plume Latraverse (born 1946), Canadian singer, musician, and writer
- Amélie Plume (born 1943), Swiss writer
- Helen Plume, New Zealand climate change expert
- Ilse Plume, American children's book illustrator
- Kenneth Plume (born 1977), American author and broadcaster
- Mike Plume (born 1968), Canadian country music singer and songwriter
- Roberts Plūme (1897–1956), Latvian cyclist and cross-country skier
- Thomas Plume (1630–1704), English churchman and philanthropist, founder of the Plume School

== Other uses ==
- Plume (company), a company that provides smart WiFi services for personal households

== See also ==
- La Plume (disambiguation)
- Plumb (disambiguation)
- Plumbe (surname)
- Pluma (disambiguation)
- Plumeria
- Flume
