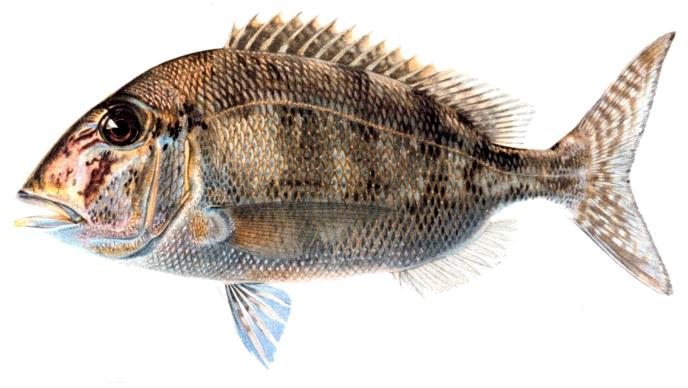

Conservation status
- Least Concern (IUCN 3.1)

Scientific classification
- Kingdom: Animalia
- Phylum: Chordata
- Class: Actinopterygii
- Division: Teleostei
- Order: Acanthuriformes
- Family: Sparidae
- Genus: Calamus
- Species: C. bajonado

Binomial name
- Calamus bajonado (Bloch & Schneider, 1801)

Synonyms
- Sparus bojanado (Bloch & Schneider, 1801); Pagrus quadrituberculatus (Ranzani, 1842); Pagellus Caninus (Poey, 1860); Calamus plumatula (Guichenot, 1868); Calamus macrops (Poey, 1872)

= Jolthead porgy =

Species of fish

The jolthead porgy (Calamus bajonado) is an ocean-going species of fish in the family Sparidae. In Bermuda it is known as the blue bone porgy, in the United States, it is also known by the Spanish name bojanado, while in Jamaica it is one of the species known by the name porgi grunt.

== Taxonomy and naming ==
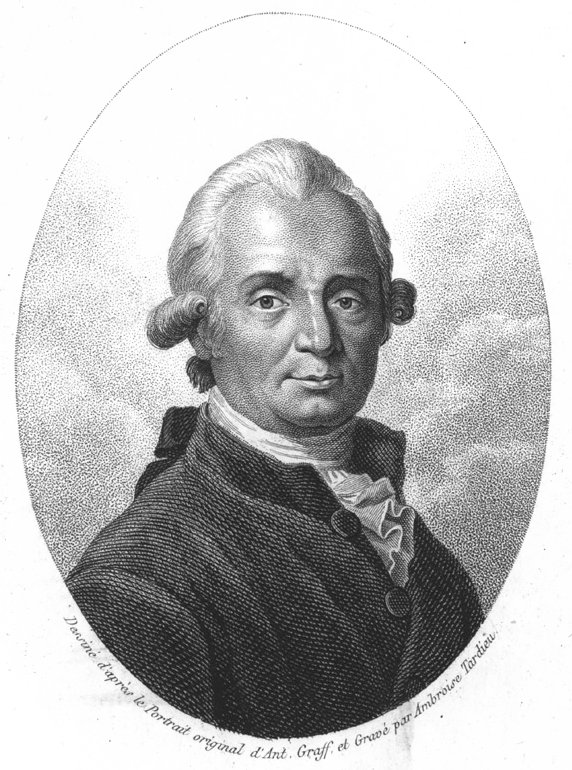
Marcus Elieser Bloch

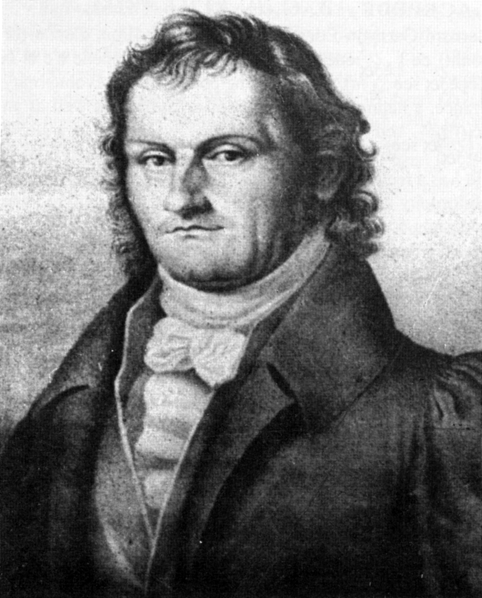
Johann Gottlob Schneider

Credit for describing the jolthead porgy goes to Marcus Elieser Bloch and Johann Gottlob Schneider. Though Bloch died in 1799, Schneider edited and republished several of Bloch's papers in a book called Systema Ichthyologiae iconibus CX illustratum in 1801. It was originally placed in the genus Sparus, which now contains only one species, but has since been moved into Calamus. The genus name comes from the mythological Calamus, or Kalamos. It was so named because the Calamus of myth, following the death of his lover, allowed himself to drown in a river and be transformed into aquatic plants that some members of the genus make their homes in. The species name, bojonado, comes from the Spanish words bojo and nado, which mean "low swimming". Its common name is thought to come from its feeding behavior – that jolthead porgies feed by jolting mollusks from rocks.

The jolthead porgy has five known synonyms, placing it in the genera Pagrus, Pagellus, Sparus, and Calamus. The holotypes of Calamus macrops and C. plumatula were reviewed in 1966 and found to be synonyms. Sparus bojanado is a senior synonym, being the name originally given by Bloch and Schneider, which is no longer the accepted name.

== Description ==
The jolthead porgy usually has 12 rays on the dorsal fin and 10 on the anal fin. They have 15 pectoral rays, though these can sometimes vary from 14 to 16. The lateral line can have from 50 to 57 scales. It differs from similar porgies in that most members of the genus has 45–49 scales on their lateral lines. It also differs from Calamus pennatula in that it has more pectoral rays. Jolthead porgies have a blue line under each eye, and their mouths are rimmed in orange. The fish's overall color is a brassy silver with occasional blue/green iridescence, making it one of the dullest-colored members of its genus.

The largest recorded jolthead porgy was 76 cm, but they commonly grow up to 54 cm. They normally attain a weight of up to around 8 lb, but the heaviest weighed was 23.36 lb.

== Distribution and habitat ==
Known only from the western Atlantic Ocean, jolthead porgies are found from Rhode Island and Bermuda south to Brazil. They are abundant in the northern Gulf of Mexico and the West Indies. They have been collected from beds of seagrass, and commonly swim in clear, shallow water down to 150 feet (46 m), (though there have been reports of them as deep as 180 and 200 m) where they are normally solitary, but sometimes appear in schools near reefs. They are thought to spawn in July and August.

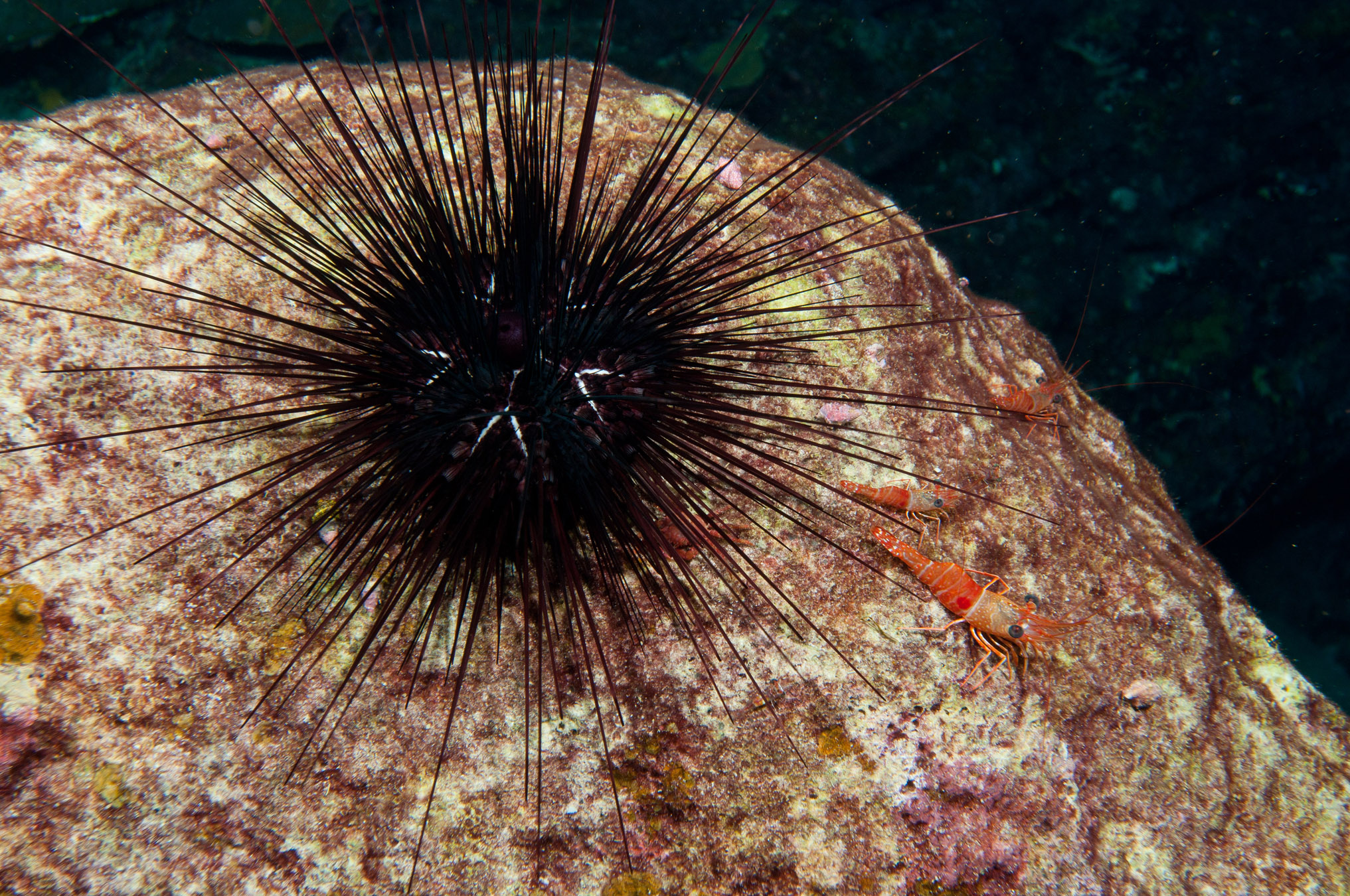
Diadema antillarum, a common Caribbean sea urchin.

There is some debate over the jolthead porgy's diet. Some sources consider it omnivorous, while others state that it mainly eats other animals such as sea urchins (especially of the genus Diadema), mollusks and crustaceans.

== Relationship with humans ==
Considered to be an excellent food fish, jolthead porgies can easily be caught with a hook and line on the bottom and by means of fish traps. They are considered to be a game fish and are of minor commercial importance, though there have been reports of ciguatera poisoning due to red tide infecting them.
