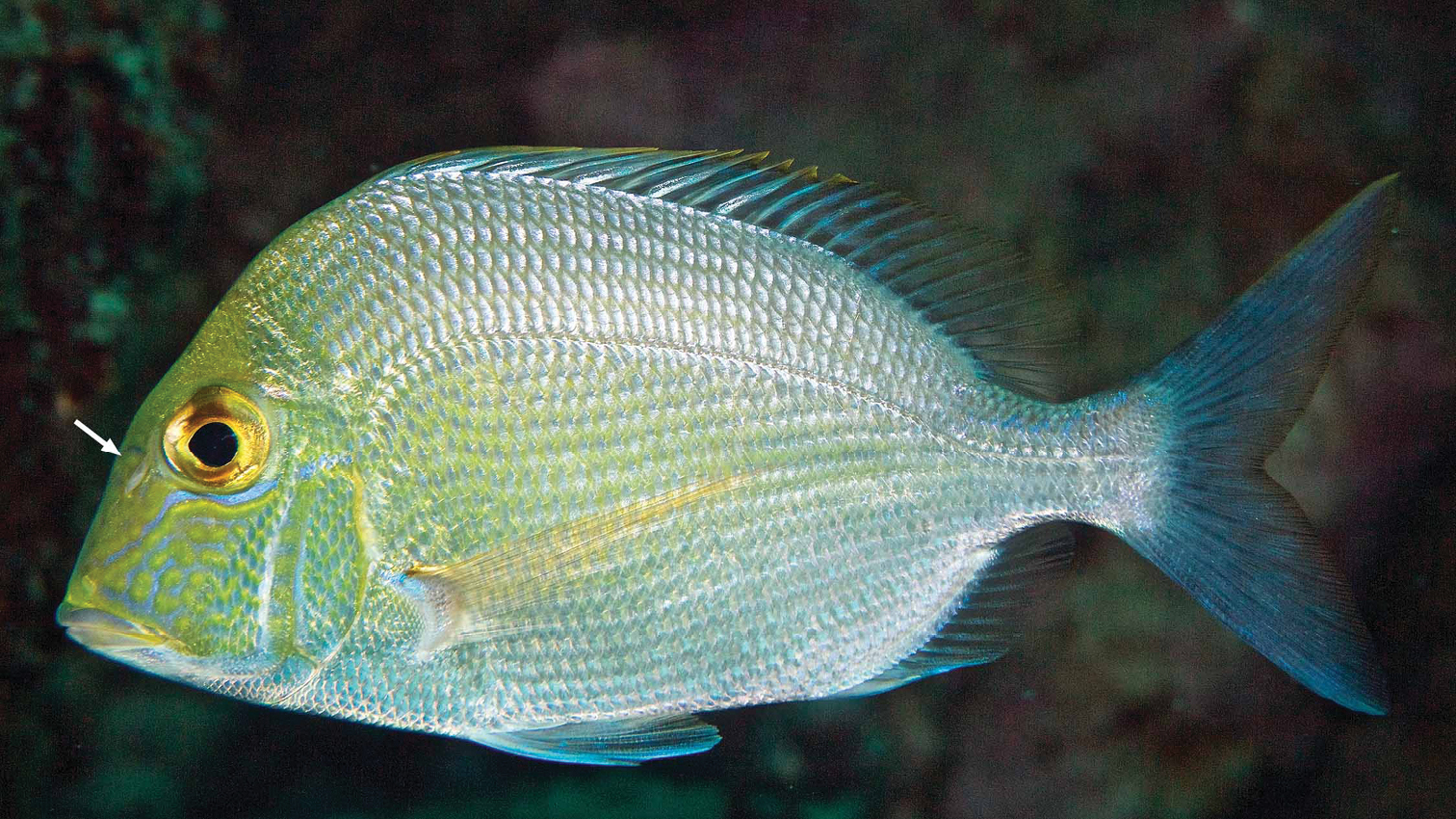
- The Knobbed porgy photographed in Veracruz Reef System National Park.

Conservation status
- Least Concern (IUCN 3.1)

Scientific classification
- Kingdom: Animalia
- Phylum: Chordata
- Class: Actinopterygii
- Division: Teleostei
- Order: Acanthuriformes
- Family: Sparidae
- Genus: Calamus
- Species: C. nodosus

Binomial name
- Calamus nodosus J. E. Randall and D. K. Caldwell, 1966

= Knobbed porgy =

Species of fish

The knobbed porgy (Calamus nodosus) is an ocean-going species of gamefish of the bream/porgy family, Sparidae. They are only found in the western portion of the tropical Atlantic Ocean, where they are often caught with trawling nets or by angling, and used as food. The knobbed porgy was named by John Randall and David K. Caldwell as part of a 1966 review of the genus Calamus, which was published in the academic journal Science. Randall and Caldwell also described three other species of Calamus in the paper.

== Description ==
Knobbed porgies have a fairly deep body with a steep profile, and a nape that projects noticeably in larger adults, later developing into a humped 'forehead'. They are similar in coloration to the littlehead porgy, with silver to brass bodies with a rosy cast and violet snouts and cheeks. Knobbed porgies can be distinguished by blue lines present on a yellowish under color.

The longest knobbed porgy ever caught was recorded at 54.4 cm, though adults on average will grow to around 35 cm. Able to live as long as 17 years, Knobbed porgies have been recorded to weigh up to 2.63 kg. Like many other members of the Teleost infraclass, knobbed porgies are sequential hermaphrodites—they are born female, and become males over their lifetimes. In this case, knobbed porgies experience sex change when they reach mature lengths of 30–50 cm.

== Distribution and habitat ==
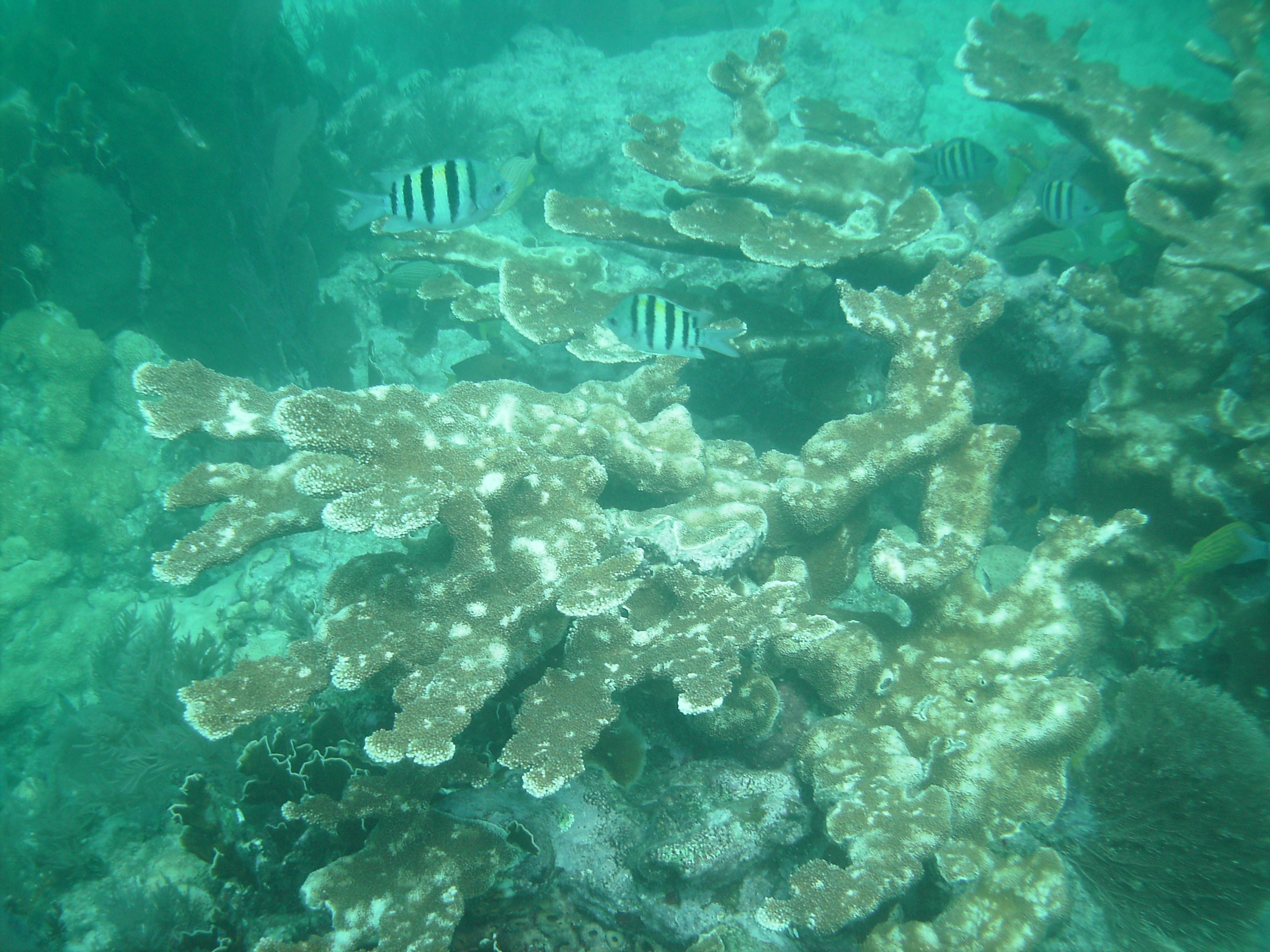
This reef, found south of Florida, would be a typical habitat for the knobbed porgy.

In the western Atlantic Ocean, the knobbed porgy is known from the coast of North Carolina south to eastern Florida and the entire Gulf of Mexico including the coast of Cuba and the Campeche bank. It is found over hard bottoms at depths from 7 to 90m, and can also be associated with ledges, coral reefs, and near-by areas of gravel, grass or sand. Knobbed porgies are carnivorous, and feed primarily on mollusks, polychaetes, crabs, and sea urchins.
