= Plumbe =

Plumbe is a surname. Notable people with the surname include:

- John Plumbe (1809–1857), Welsh-born American photographer
- Rowland Plumbe (1838–1919), English architect

== See also ==
- Plume (disambiguation)
- Plumb (surname)
