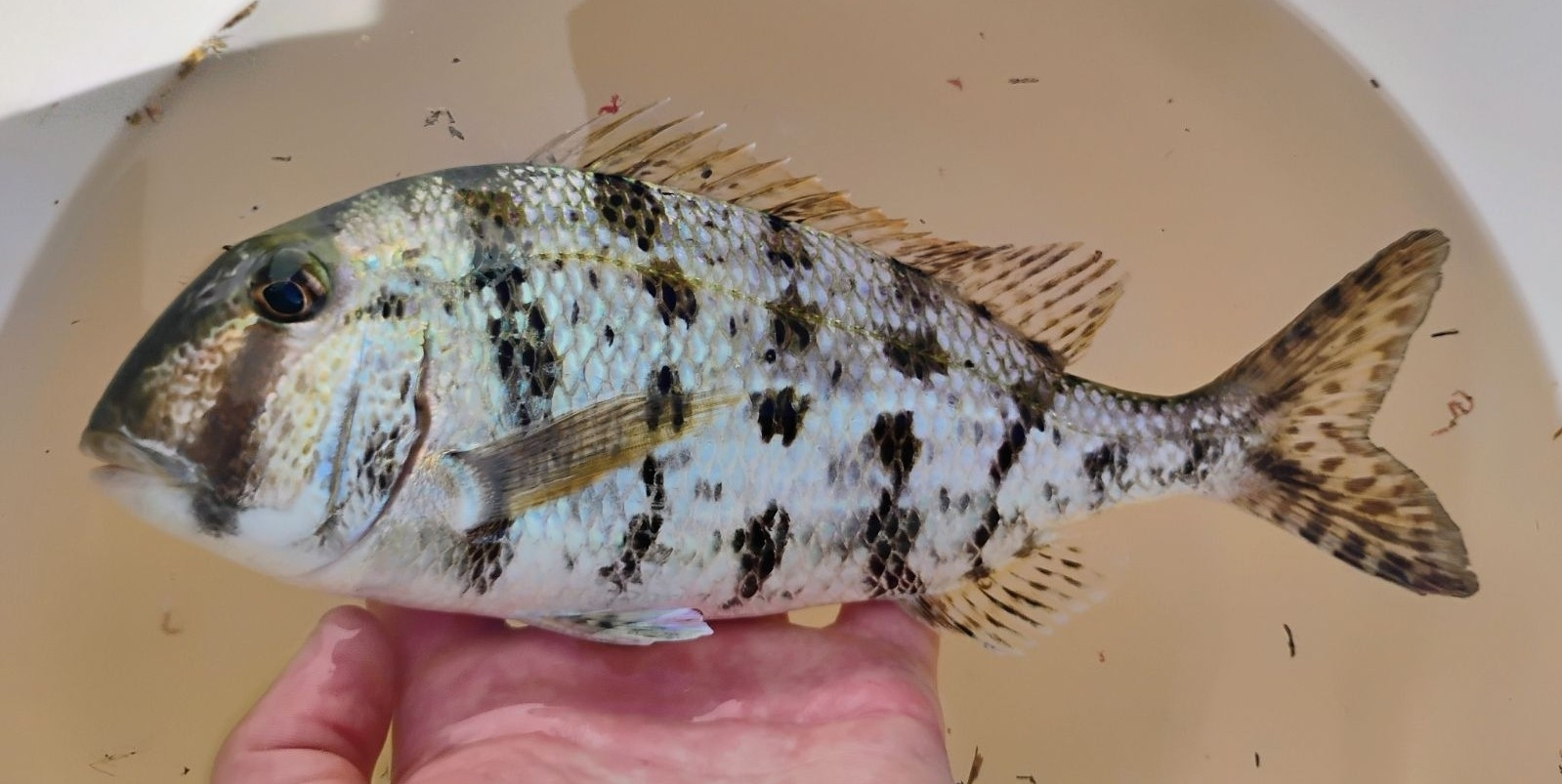

Conservation status
- Least Concern (IUCN 3.1)

Scientific classification
- Kingdom: Animalia
- Phylum: Chordata
- Class: Actinopterygii
- Division: Teleostei
- Order: Acanthuriformes
- Family: Sparidae
- Genus: Calamus
- Species: C. arctifrons

Binomial name
- Calamus arctifrons (Goode & Bean, 1882)

= Calamus arctifrons =

Species of ray-finned fish

The grass porgy (Calamus arctifrons) is a species of ray-finned fish in the family Sparidae. It is endemic to the northeastern Gulf of Mexico and occurs in shallow coastal waters in seagrass beds.

== Taxonomy ==
Calamus arctifrons was first described by George Brown Goode and Tarleton Hoffman Bean in 1882. The species name, arctifrons translates to "contracted forehead".

== Description ==
Grass porgies are small, oblong-bodied and features a narrow head (thus the translated name, "contracted forehead") and an unevenly curved anterior profile. The head is also nearly twice diameter of the eyes and 2.5 times smaller than the largest dorsal fin.

A dark bar across the nape extends through the eyes to the corner of mouth. The dark bars are also arranged in roughly five vertical and four horizontal series with dashes of golden yellow on their body, which ranges from olivaceous to pale tan or a silvery colour. Their appearance can also changed if they are overly excited and range from a pale unmarked version to a sheepshead-like pattern with heavy black crossbands. When frightened, the fish also become more darker with white dots scattered around the body in a controlled environment.

Grass porgies can reach to a size of about 25 centimetres (9.8 in). They can be found primarily in the Gulf of Mexico, specifically Southern Florida to Louisiana and go far north as Pensacola Bay.

== Conservation status ==
Calamus arctifrons is listed as least concern on the IUCN Red List of Threatened Species. It is reported as widespread and abundant within its distribution and its population appears to be stable. It is vulnerable to localised population declines due to toxic algal blooms (also known as red tides) and degradation of seagrass habitats.
