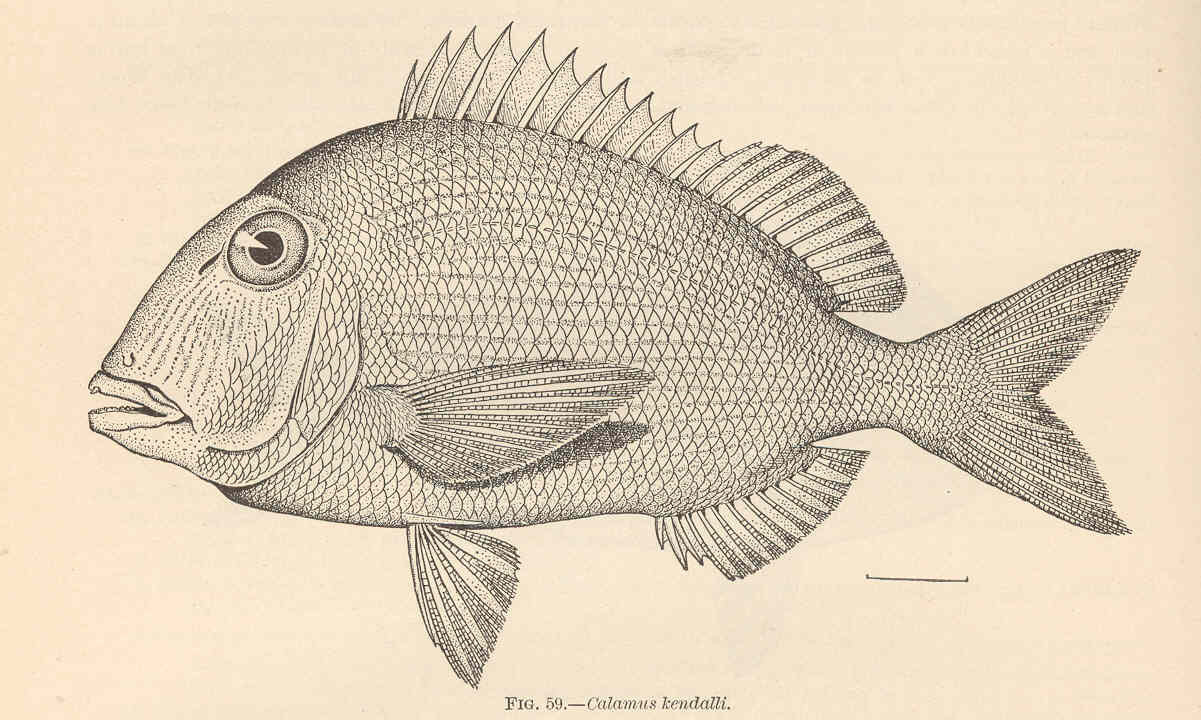

Conservation status
- Least Concern (IUCN 3.1)

Scientific classification
- Kingdom: Animalia
- Phylum: Chordata
- Class: Actinopterygii
- Order: Acanthuriformes
- Family: Sparidae
- Genus: Calamus
- Species: C. pennatula

Binomial name
- Calamus pennatula Guichenot, 1868

= Pluma porgy =

Species of fish

The pluma porgy (Calamus pennatula), also known as the West Indian porgy, pluma or pimento grunt, is a species of marine ray-finned fish belonging to the family Sparidae, the seabreams and porgies. This species is found in the Western Atlantic Ocean.

== Taxonomy ==
The pluma porgy was first formally described in 1868 by the Frenchzoologist Alphonse Guichenot with its type locality given as Martinique. The genus Calamus is placed in the family Sparidae within the order Spariformes by the 5th edition of Fishes of the World. Some authorities classify this genus in the subfamily Sparinae, but the 5th edition of Fishes of the World does not recognise subfamilies within the Sparidae.

== Etymology and common names ==
The pluma porgy has the specific name pennatula which is a diminutive of penna, meaning "quill". Guichenot did not explain this but it may be an allusion to this species similarity to C. penna or to the shorter, more elongated body of this species compared to C. penna. In many parts of the Caribbean, this species is simply known as the pluma, while in Jamaica it is sometimes called the pimento grunt, and is sometimes known as the West Indian porgy in the United States.

== Description ==
The pluma porgy is similar to its relative, the Jolthead porgy (C. bajonado). However, it has fewer rays on its Pectoral fins than the Jolthead. The pluma porgy has both 12 spines and 12 soft rays on its dorsal fin, while it has only 3 spines and 10 rays on its anal fin. Their heads are somewhat steep when viewed in profile, and have poorly developed prefrontal tubercles. The puma porgy's overall color is silvery with purple, or lavender iridescence, individual scales have brown-yellow edges with iridescent, blue-green spots. This species has a maximum published total length of 37 cm (15 in), although 30 cm (12 in) is more typical.

== Distribution and habitat ==
Pluma porgies inhabit are found only in the western Atlantic, in a region from the Bahamas to Brazil; this includes much of the southern Caribbean and the Gulf of Mexico. Adults live at depths of up to 85 metres (279 ft), but usually between 5 and 30 metres (16 and 98 ft). They inhabit rocky areas, reefs, and also flat bottoms, where they feed on crabs, mollusks, sea worms, brittle stars and hermit crabs. The young are found in somewhat shallower water.

== Fisheries ==
Pluma porgies are the most common member of their genus in the Antilles, where they are often used for food, although ciguatera poisoning has been reported as a result of this.
