= La Plume (disambiguation) =

La Plume was a French bi-monthly literary and artistic review.

La Plume or Laplume may also refer to:

- La Plume, Pennsylvania
- La Plume Township, Lackawanna County, Pennsylvania
- Laplume, a commune in Lot-et-Garonne department, France

== See also ==
- Pluma (disambiguation)
- Plume (disambiguation)
