= Plumas =

Plumas (Spanish, 'feathers') may refer to the following places:

- Plumas, Manitoba, Canada
- Plumas County, California, United States
  - Plumas National Forest
  - Feather River (Rio de las Plumas)

== See also ==
- Pluma (disambiguation)
- USS Plumas County, American tank landing ship
