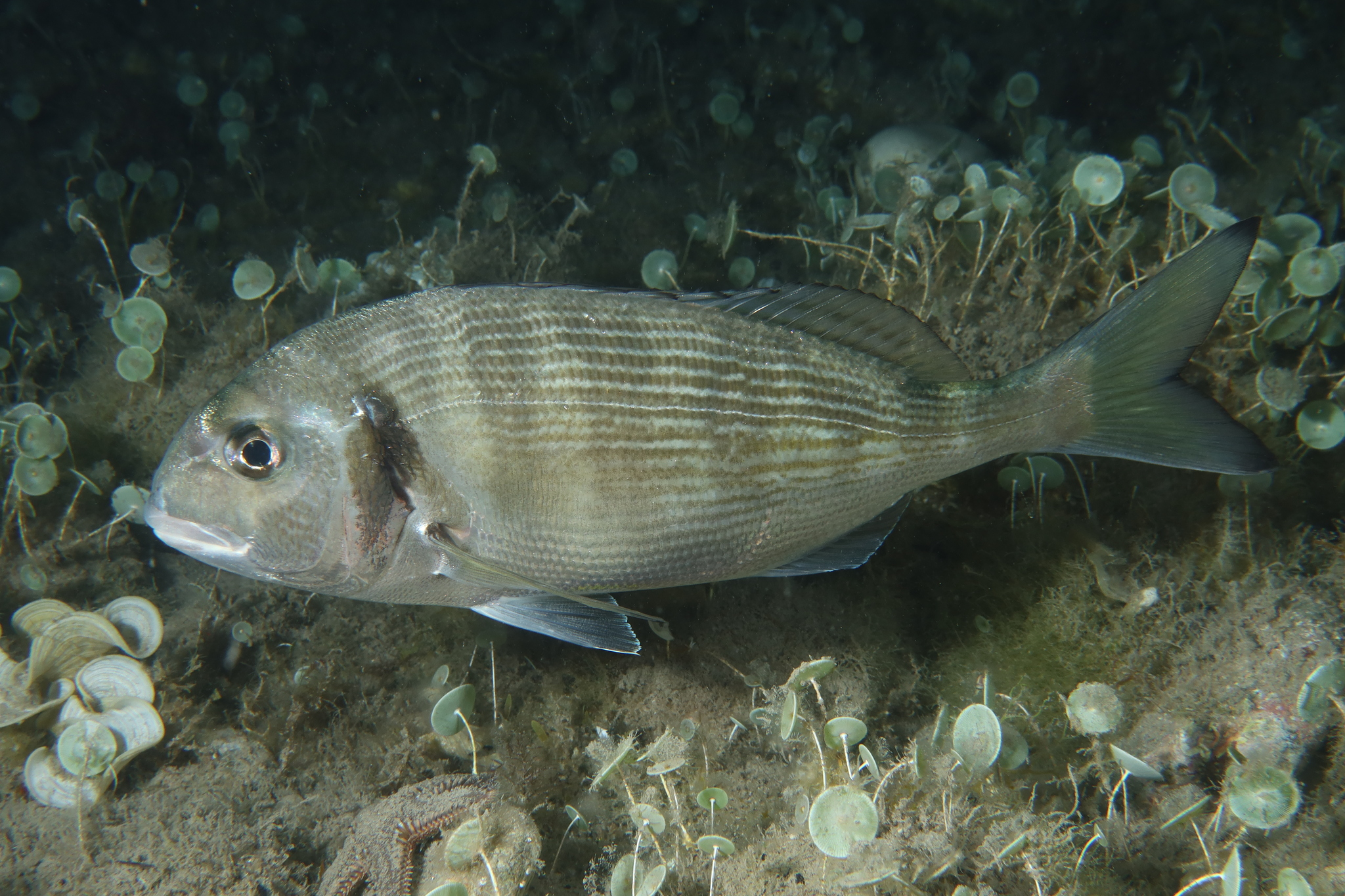
- In PACA, France

Conservation status
- Least Concern (IUCN 3.1)

Scientific classification
- Kingdom: Animalia
- Phylum: Chordata
- Class: Actinopterygii
- Division: Teleostei
- Order: Acanthuriformes
- Family: Sparidae
- Genus: Sparus
- Species: S. aurata

Binomial name
- Sparus aurata Linnaeus, 1758

Synonyms
- Aurata aurata (Linnaeus, 1758); Chrysophrys aurata (Linnaeus, 1758); Chrysophrys crassirostris Valenciennes, 1830

= Gilt-head bream =

Gilt-head bream Temporal range: Middle Miocene to present

Mediterranean fish

The gilt-head bream (Sparus aurata), also known as the gilthead, dourade, gilt-head seabream, European seabream or silver seabream, is a species of marine ray-finned fish belonging to the family Sparidae, the seabreams or porgies. This fish is found in the Eastern Atlantic and the Mediterranean. It is a highly esteemed food fish and an important species in aquaculture.

== Taxonomy ==
The gilt-head bream was first formally described in 1758 by Carl Linnaeus in the 10th edition of Systema Naturae with its type locality given as the Mediterranean and Venezuela (although this has now been shown to be a specimen of Calamus). It is the only species in the monospecific genus Sparus.

The genus Sparus is placed in the family Sparidae within the order Spariformes by the 5th edition of Fishes of the World. Some authorities classify this genus in the subfamily Sparinae, but the 5th edition of Fishes of the World does not recognise subfamilies within the Sparidae.

=== Fossil record ===
The extinct fossil species †Sparus umbonatus (Münster, 1846) is known from the Middle Miocene of central and eastern Europe, where it inhabited the Paratethys Sea.

== Etymology ==
The gilt-head bream has the genus name Sparus which derives from sparos and Ancient Greek name for this species. The specific name, aurata, means "gold", an allusion to the gold band on the intraorbital part of the head.

== Distribution and habitat ==
The gilt-head bream is found in the northeastern Atlantic and the Mediterranean from Great Britain and Ireland to possibly as far south as Senegal, including the Canary Islands. It is found around Madeira but these are escapes from aquaculture. It also occurs throughout the Mediterranean and in the southern and western parts of the Black Sea.

This species is found over sandy substrates and in seagrass beds at depths between 1 and 150 m (3 ft 3 in and 492 ft 2 in), with adults in deeper waters than juveniles, the young fish typically going no deeper than 30 m (98 ft). It is a euryhaline species that will enter brackish waters.

== Description ==
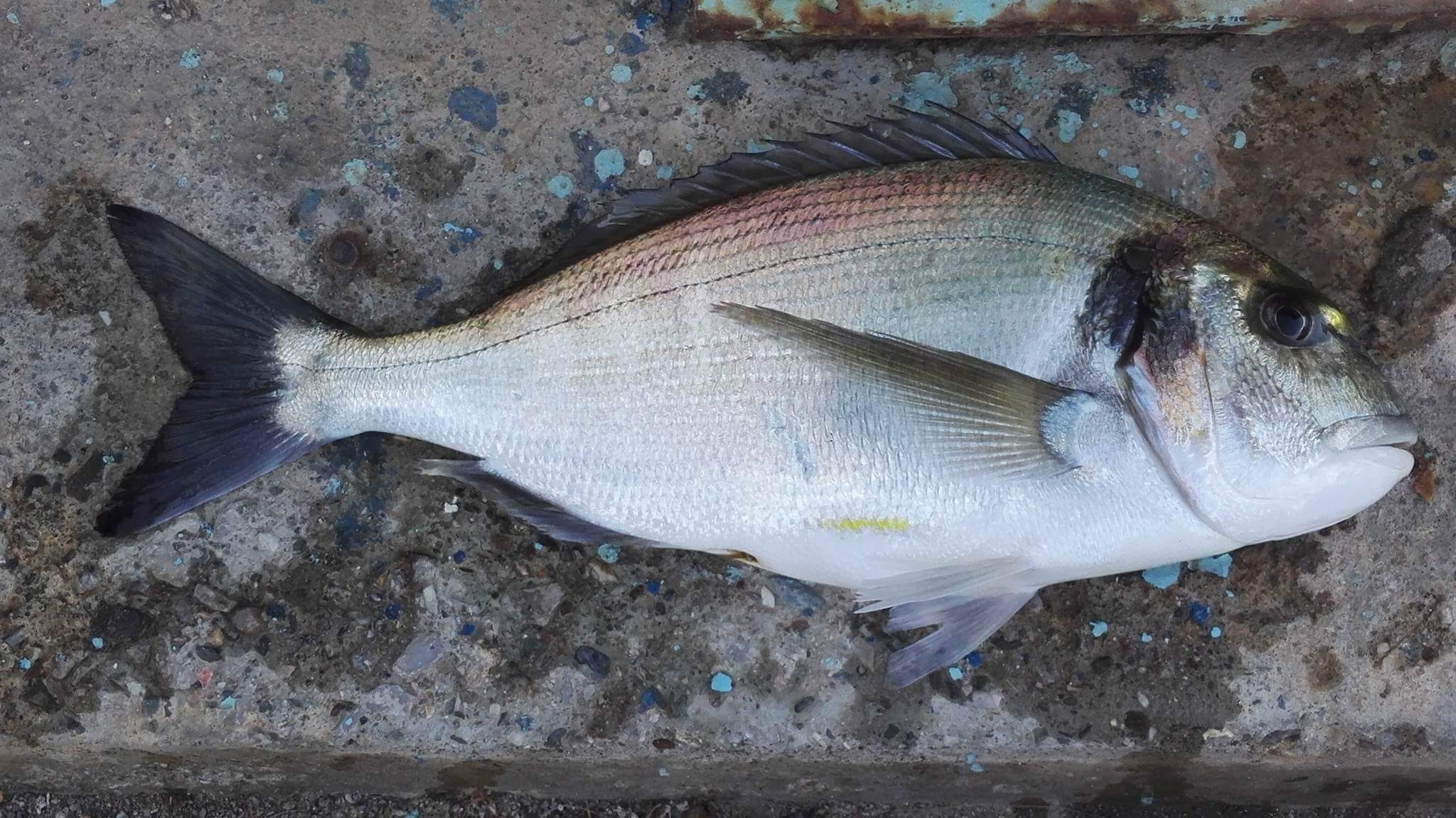
In Tlemcen, Algeria

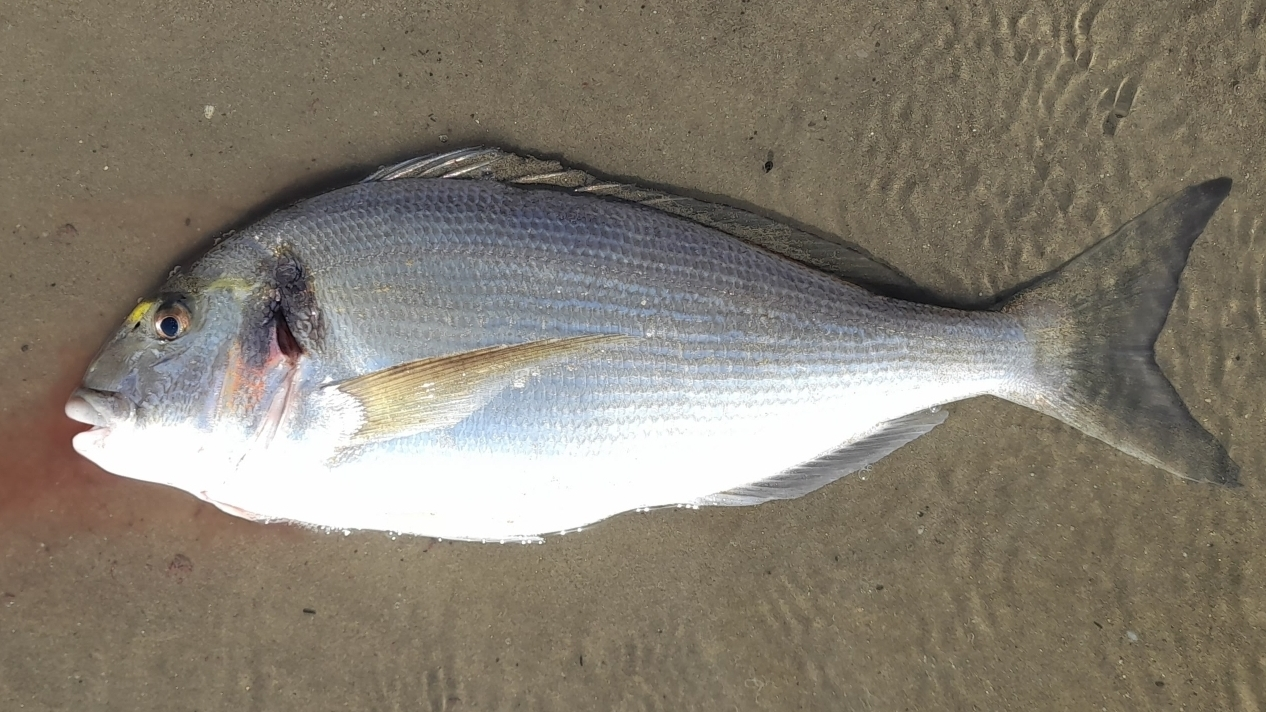
In Toscana, Italy

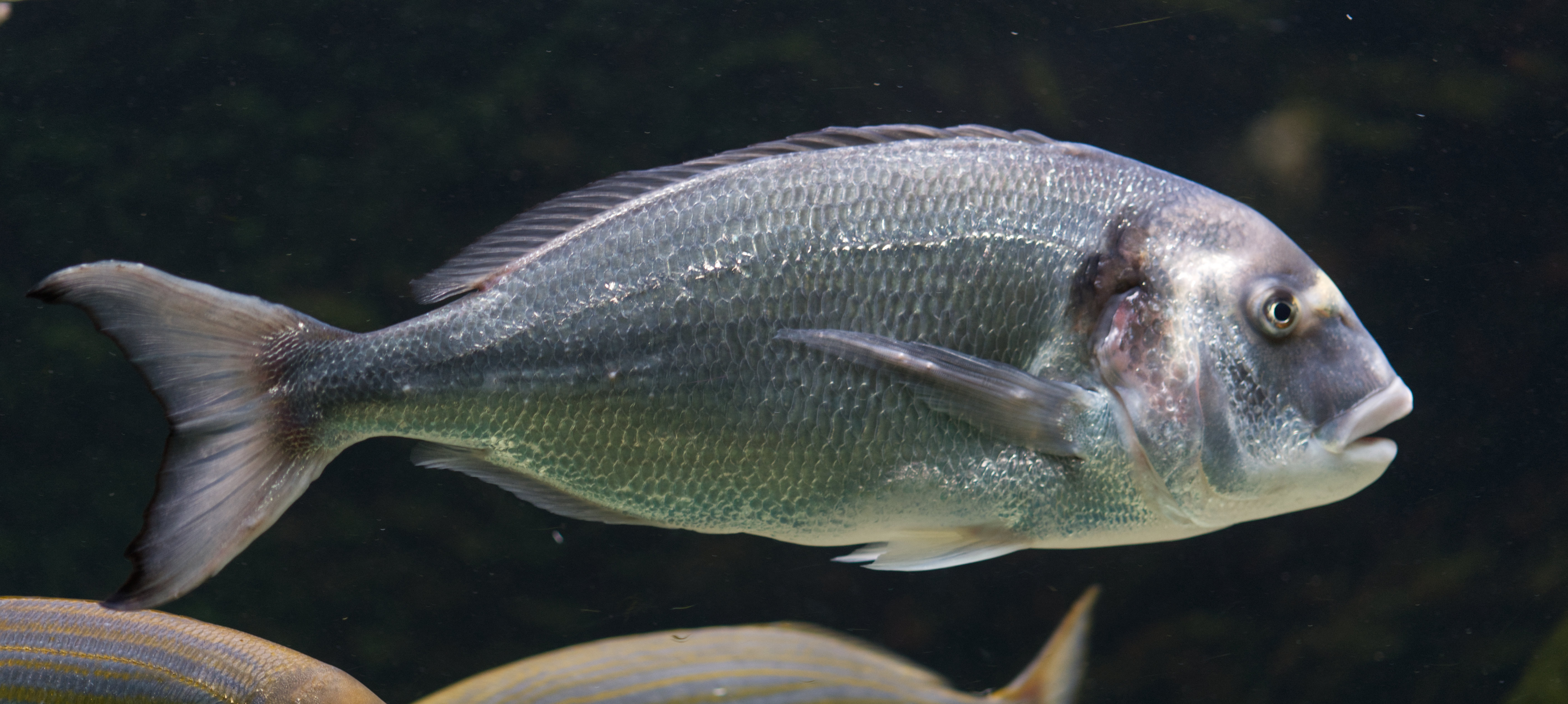
In captivity

In captivity

The gilt-head bream has a deep body, with a large, deep head which has its relatively small eyes placed high on the head. The diameter of the eyes is shorter than the length of the snout. The cheeks are deep and covered in scales but the preoperculum has no scales, although the operculum is scaled. It has a long-based dorsal fin which is supported by 11 robust spines and 13 or 14 branched soft rays. The anal fin is short based and is held up by three spines and 11 or 12 branched soft rays. It has large and robust teeth in the jaws with four to six large, pointed canine-like teeth in the front the jaws with 2 to 4 rows of blunt, round teeth laterally. It has a blue-grey back, the sides are silvery with a large dark spot behind the eye, it is red along the margin of the operculum and there is a golden bar on the head between the eyes.

This species has a maximum total length of 70 cm (28 in), although a standard length of 35 cm (14 in) is more typical, and a maximum published weight of 17.2 kg (38 lb).

== Biology ==
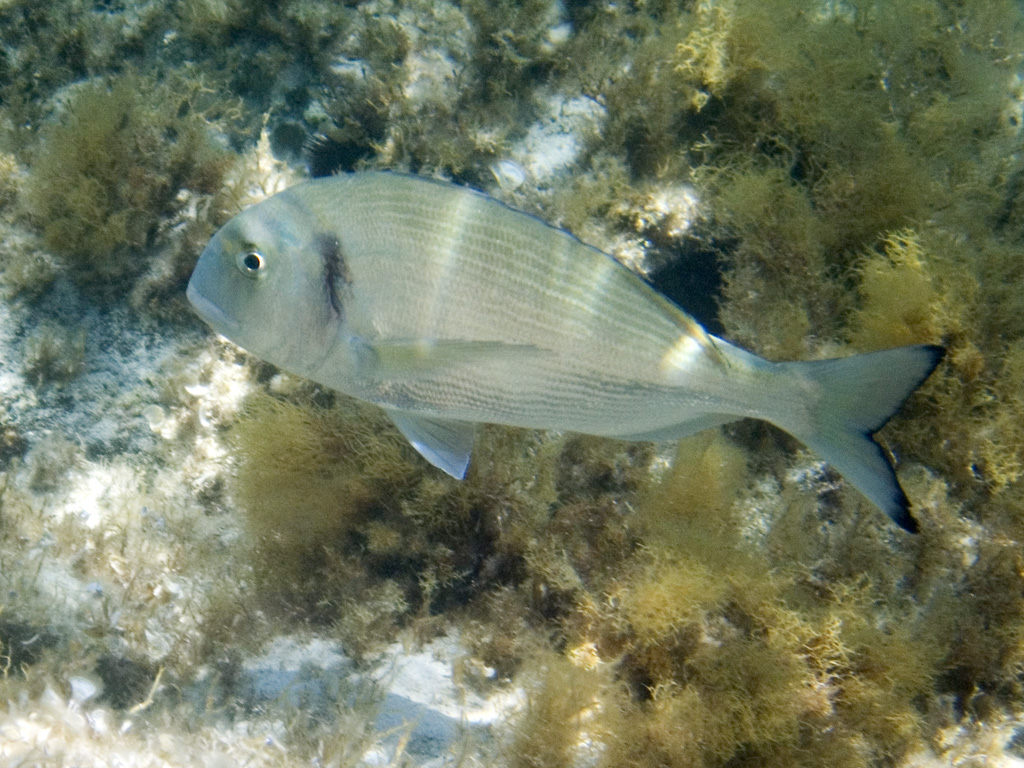
At Sardinia, Italy

The gilt-head bream feeds mainly on shellfish, but also some plant material

Gilt-head bream are protandrous sequential hermaphrodites, maturing as males by age 2, before some develop ovaries and lose their testes in later life.

The genome of the species was released in 2018, where the authors detected fast evolution of ovary-biased genes likely resulting from the peculiar reproduction mode of the species.

== Fisheries ==
FAO report of capture (blue) and aquaculture (green) production of S. aurata in thousand tonnes from 1960 to 2022.

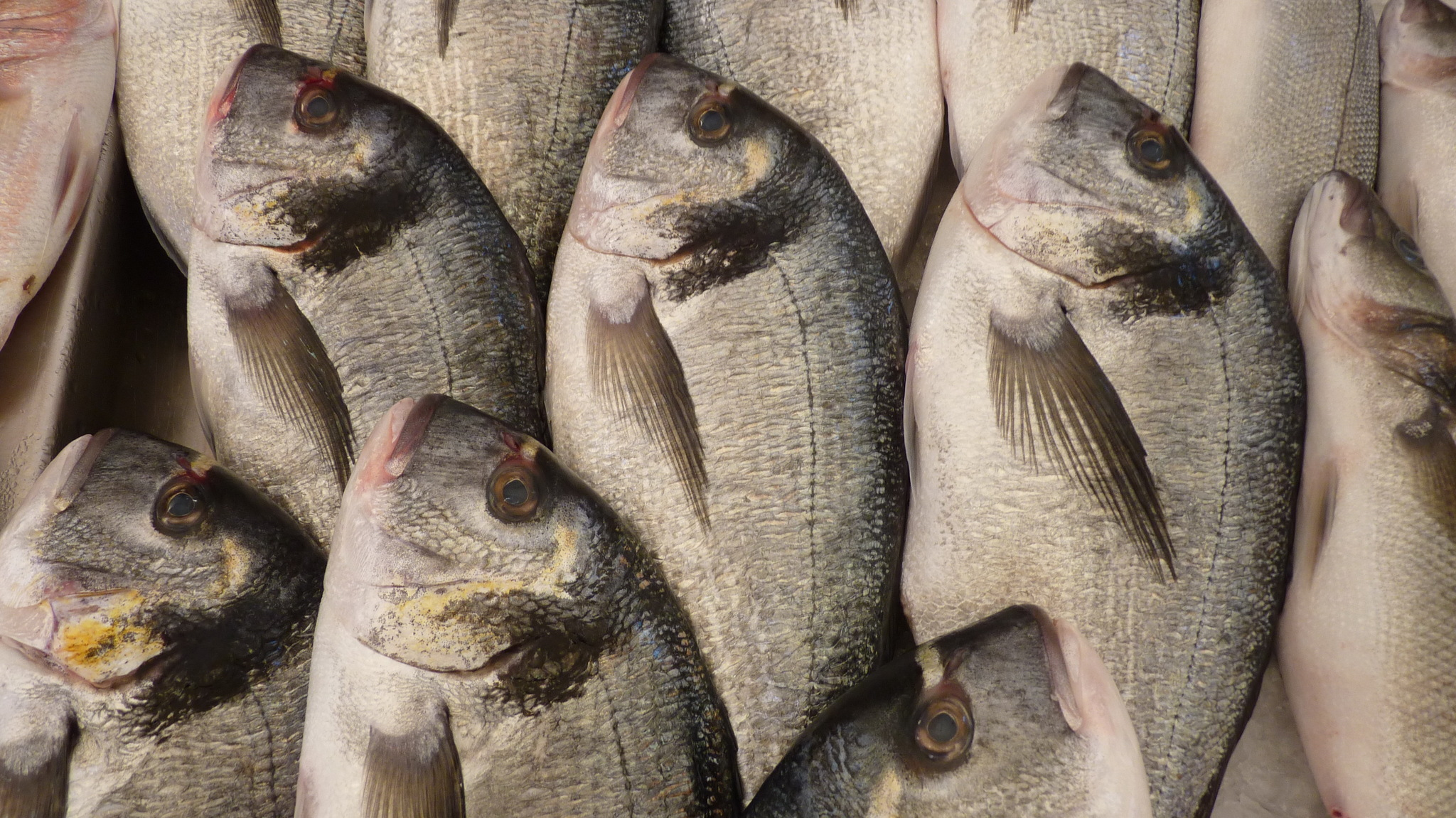
Gilt-head bream in Madeira, Portugal

Gilt-head seabream is an esteemed food fish, but catches of wild fish have been relatively modest, between 6,100 and 9,600 metric tons (6,000 and 9,400 long tons; 6,700 and 10,600 short tons) in 2000–2009, primarily from the Mediterranean.

=== Aquaculture ===
Gilt-head seabream have traditionally been cultured extensively in coastal lagoons and saltwater ponds. However, intensive rearing systems were developed during the 1980s, and gilt-head seabream has become an important aquaculture species, primarily in the Mediterranean area and Portugal. Reported production was negligible until the late 1980s, but reached 140,000 metric tons (140,000 long tons; 150,000 short tons) in 2010, thus dwarfing the capture fisheries production. Turkey is the biggest seabream producer in the world, followed by Greece.

One of the biggest challenges facing the sea bream aquaculture industry is the frequency of skeletal abnormalities. This is caused by factors such as high stocking density during larval rearing.

Gilt-head seabreams in aquaculture are susceptible to parasitic infections, including from Enterospora nucleophila. Bacterial outbreaks due to Pseudomonas anguilliseptica have also been documented.

== Culinary use ==
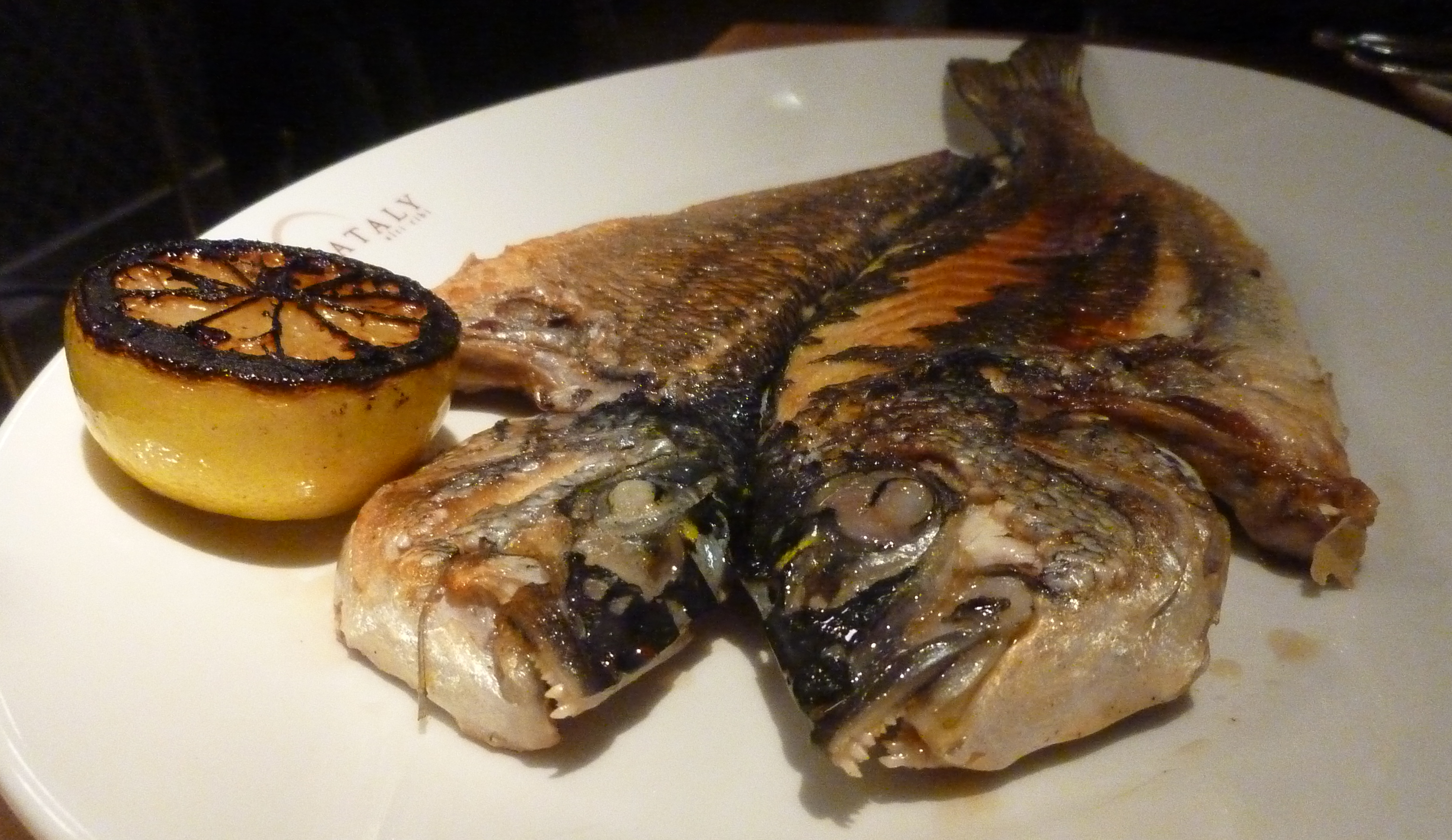
Butterflied gilt-head bream in NYC

The gilt-head bream is the most esteemed seabream for culinary purposes, especially in Southern Europe where the mild and sweet flavour of the flesh, which breaks into small flakes, is popular.

== See also ==
- Acanthopagrus
