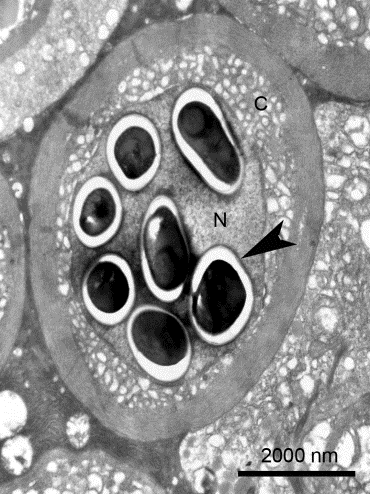
- Transmission electron micrograph of an Enterospora nucleophila-infected rodlet cell harbouring spores within its nucleus (N). No stages are visible in the cytoplasm (C)

Scientific classification
- Kingdom: Fungi
- Phylum: Microsporidia
- Class: incertae sedis
- Genus: Enterospora
- Species: E. nucleophila

Binomial name
- Enterospora nucleophila Palenzuela, Redondo, Cali, Takvorian, Alonso-Naveiro, Alvarez-Pellitero & Sitjà-Bobadilla, 2014

= Enterospora nucleophila =

Species of parasitic fungus

Enterospora nucleophila is a microsporidian infecting the gilt-head bream (Sparus aurata). It develops primarily within the nuclei of rodlet cells and enterocytes, at the intestinal epithelium. It can also be found in cytoplasmic position within other cell types, including phagocytes, at subepithelial layers. It is the causative agent of emaciative microsporidiosis of gilthead sea bream, a chronic condition manifested as a severe growth arrestment, normally accompanied by trickling mortality.

== Taxonomy ==
E. nucleophila is a microsporidian, a group of intracellular parasites related to fungi. This species is rooted within the family Enterocytozoonidae. According to SSUrDNA-based phylogenetic inference, it clusters with Enterocytozoon hepatopenaei, Enterospora canceri and Enterocytozoon bieneusi in a well-supported clade. The Enterocytozoonidae branches within the class Terresporidia in molecular-based classification of microsporidians but taxonomical classification above the family level is currently not entirely settled in this phylum.

== Life cycle ==
Only the development within gilthead sea bream is currently known. Since some of the closest relatives of E. nucleophila infect crustaceans (e.g., Enterospora canceri or E. hepatopenaei), and some of them have heteroxenous cycles alternating between crustacean and fish hosts (e.g., Desmozoon lepeophtheri [3]), a similar alternating cycle could occur for E. nucleophila.

== Pathology and clinical signs ==
Infections by E. nucleophila are associated with stunted growth of gilthead sea bream stocks, which can be accompanied by low-level but sustained trickling mortality (0.1-0.3% daily, up to 1% at peaks per sea cage). Affected fish normally appear lethargic and cachectic, with other nonspecific signs like discolouration and occasional scale loss. Upon necropsy, gross pathological alterations include thinned and transparent wall in the intestines, which frequently accumulate clear or greenish fluid and white faeces in the terminal portion. The condition seems to appear in gilthead sea bream during their first winter in sea cages. As a result of the arrested growth of infected animals, these can average half the weight of the unaffected stock.

== Impact ==
The disease was first noticed in the early 2000s. However, the difficulties in the diagnosis of the parasite probably delayed acknowledgement of its presence and impact. Indeed, the parasite and its association with gilthead sea bream emaciative microsporidiosis were not described until recently, but retrospective studies identified it in samples taken in 1993. The main clinical signs are only noticed in severe infections and can be largely masked by other infectious diseases of gilthead sea bream. Therefore, the approaches to understand the true impact of the disease can only be formed after the development of appropriate diagnostic methods to conduct specific epidemiological and risk-assessment studies. Besides the mortality, the main economic impact of the parasite is related to the segregation of sizes caused by the infection within affected sea cages, as it results in inefficient feeding, serious biomass and quality losses at the harvest.

== Diagnosis ==
Presumptive diagnosis can be made based on clinical signs and histopathological examination of the intestinal epithelium. The most common observation in heavy infections is the presence of numerous hypertrophied cell nuclei and a remarkable hypercellularity. When present, tiny microsporidian spores (1.67 x 1.05 μm) can be identified. Like in other microsporidioses, the detection of spores can be facilitated with calcofluor-white M2R or luna stains. More reliable confirmatory diagnosis of E. nucleophila is possible with molecular-based methods, in situ hybridization and RT-PCR tests.

== Treatments ==
There are currently no approved therapies for E. nucleophila. Microsporidian infections relevant for human and animal medicine are normally treated with Albendazole, Metronidazole or Fumagillin, but the use of these drugs in aquaculture settings is not regulated and their effectivity for treating gilthead sea bream microsporidiosis is unknown.

== Research ==
As an emerging disease of gilthead sea bream, understanding E. nucleophila infection and exploring ways to mitigate its impact in aquaculture facilities has just started. The EU funded Horizon 2020 Project has tackled several objectives related to this infection, like the development and validation of diagnostic methods and their use in epidemiological studies to evaluate the impact and risks factors associated to the disease. Ongoing research framed within the project has also focused on developing means for the transmission and maintenance of the infection in the laboratory, as well as its in vitro cultivation. More ambitious goals, such as the genome sequencing and the identification of therapeutic and diagnostic targets have also been attempted but are currently struggling with difficulties in reproducing the disease in the laboratory and generating appropriate material.
