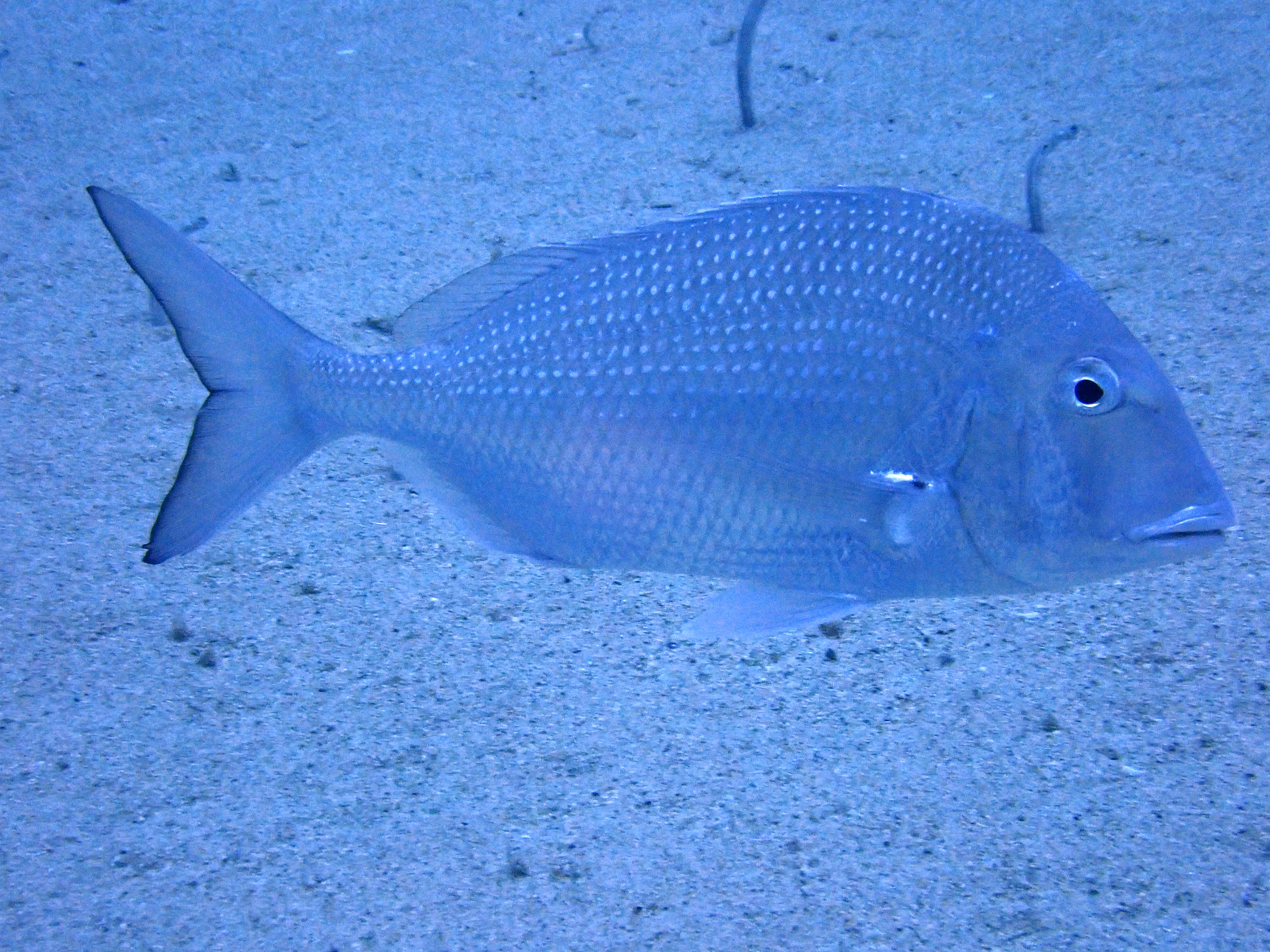

Conservation status
- Least Concern (IUCN 3.1)

Scientific classification
- Kingdom: Animalia
- Phylum: Chordata
- Class: Actinopterygii
- Order: Acanthuriformes
- Family: Sparidae
- Genus: Calamus
- Species: C. penna

Binomial name
- Calamus penna (Valenciennes, 1830)

Synonyms
- Pagellus penna Valenciennes, 1830; Pagellus microps Guichenot, 1853; Pagellus humilis Poey, 1868; Grammateus medius Poey, 1872; Pagellus milneri Goode & T. H. Bean, 1879

= Sheepshead porgy =

Species of fish

The sheepshead porgy (Calamus penna), also known as the littlemouth porgy or speckled porgy, is a species of marine ray-finned fish belonging to the family Sparidae, the seabreams and porgies. This species is found in the Western Atlantic Ocean.

== Taxonomy ==
The sheepshead porgy was first formally described in 1830 as Pagellus penna by the French zoologist Achille Valenciennes with its type locality given as Brazil. The genus Calamus is placed in the family Sparidae within the order Spariformes by the 5th edition of Fishes of the World. Some authorities classify this genus in the subfamily Sparinae, but the 5th edition of Fishes of the World does not recognise subfamilies within the Sparidae.

== Etymology ==
The sheepshead porgy's specific name is penna, this means "quill" apparently an allusion to the hollow, pen-like second spine in the anal fin spine, however in this case Valenciennes stated it was so named for its affinity with C. calamus, the specific name of which also means "quill" or "pen".

== Description ==
The sheepshead porgy, like other Calamus porgies has a deep, compressed body and deep head. The dorsal profile of the head is smoothly convex and is not all that steep and the snout is blunt. The posterior nostrils are elongated and even similar to slits. The mouth is moderately large, extending to beneath the front of eye and the upper jaw protrudes just beyond the lower jaw. The upper lip is split into 2 nearly equal parts by a horizontal groove. The suborbital bone overlaps the rear of the maxilla. The low dorsal fin is supported by 13 spines and 12 soft rays and the anal fin is short supported by 3 small spines and 10 to 11 soft rays. The overall color is silvery, with lavender, blue and yellow iridescences on the scales. There are normally indistinct stripes along body. There is occasionally a bluish-gray stripe below the eye as well as a dark brown bar, The upper base of the pectoral fin has a blackish spot. On live fish there may be around 7 dark bars. The sheepshead porgy has a maximum published total length of 46 cm (18 in) although 28 cm (11 in).

== Distribution and habitat ==
The sheepshead porgy is found in the Western Atlantic Ocean from Florida south through the West Indies and Caribbean south as far as Brazil. This species is found in clear reef areas between 3 and 87 m (9.8 and 285.4 ft) over soft or rubble seabeds. The juveniles are found in seagrass beds.
