= Enterospora =

Scientific classification
- Kingdom: Fungi
- Phylum: Microsporidia
- Class: incertae sedis
- Genus: Enterospora; Stentiford, Bateman, Longshaw & Feist, 2007

Genus of microsporidia

Enterospora is a genus of fungi belonging to the family Enterocytozoonidae..

It was originally described by Stentiford, G.; Bateman, K.; Longshaw, M.; Feist, S in 2007.

Species:

- Enterospora canceri Stentiford, Bateman, Longshaw & Feist, 2007
- Enterospora nucleophila Palenzuela, Redondo, Cali, Takvorian, Alonso-Naveiro, Alvarez-Pellitero & Sitjà-Bobadilla, 2014
