= Caroline Plumb =

British internet entrepreneur (born 1978)

Caroline Plumb OBE
- Education: University of Oxford
- Occupations: entrepreneur, business person
- Organization: Amtivo Group
- Honours: OBE

Caroline Bayantai Plumb OBE (born 23 November 1978) is a British internet entrepreneur and businesswoman. She is the current CEO of Amtivo Group, an accredited certification body delivering certification, training, and technology-enabled services to businesses worldwide. She is the former CEO and co-founder of Fluidly and previously served as a CEO of FreshMinds. She has also served as a non-executive director of AIM-listed Mercia Technologies. In 2019, she was named as one of the most important women personalities in UK Tech 100 list.

== Career ==
Plumb was born in Manchester on 23 November 1978, the daughter of Stephen and Eleanor. She went to Bolton School Girls' Division. She then studied at St John's College, Oxford and gained a first-class degree in engineering, economics and management. After graduating she began her career as an entrepreneur and initiated FreshMinds as a research consultancy in 2000 with colleague Charlie Osmond. She left Freshminds and co-founded Fluidly, a cash flow management software business company and served as its chief executive officer until 2021. Octopus Titan VCT plc reported a loss of £13 million on their investment in Fluidly in their half-yearly report for the six months ended 30 June 2022. In February 2022, she became CEO at Gravita, a tech-enabled accounting firm and leading provider of audit, tax, payroll and accountancy services to small and medium-sized businesses. During her tenure, Gravita Group Limited reported losses of £5.4m in the year ending April 2024, and £3.5m in the year ending April 2023, according to the accounts filed at Companies House. In 2025, Business & Accountancy Daily reported that Caroline Plumb has left the business 'by mutual agreement'. In 2003, she was nominated in Management Today's 35 Women Under 35 list for her outstanding services in the business field. In 2010, she was appointed by the prime minister of the United Kingdom as a UK business ambassador in the "Professional and Business Services" sector, a position she held until the Business Ambassador Network was closed in 2019.

Plumb was appointed the OBE in the 2016 Birthday Honours "for services to business and charity". In February 2020, she co-founded the COVID-19 Volunteer Testing Network.

Since 2021, Caroline has written a monthly column for The Times focused on small business growth and entrepreneurship.

In September 2025, Caroline was appointed CEO of Amtivo Group, succeeding Mike Tims, who had led the business since 2017 and subsequently became Chairman of the Amtivo Board.

Caroline was previously an Independent Member of the Regional Growth Fund, on the Department for Business’ Small Business Forum and National Council for Graduate Entrepreneurship. She was also a member of the council for UK Research and Innovation.

== Personal life ==
Plumb is the granddaughter of renowned Daur Mongol scholar Urgunge Onon, who co-founded the Mongolian and Inner Asian Studies Unit at the University of Cambridge.
