= Phillip Plumb =

Australian rules footballer

Personal information
- Full name: Phillip Plumb
- Born: 22 August 1958 (age 68)
- Original team: Emmanuel
- Height: 198 cm (6 ft 6 in)
- Weight: 92 kg (203 lb)

Playing career^{1}
Years	Club	Games (Goals)
1978–81	South Melbourne	332 (789)
- ^{1} Playing statistics correct to the end of 1981.

Career highlights
- 3 Brownlow, 11 best and fairests

Phillip Plumb (born 22 August 1958) is a former Australian rules footballer who played with South Melbourne in the Victorian Football League He is a member of Sandhurst Golf Club and uses the red tees. Rarely has over 30 points and everyone thinks he is a knob. (VFL).
