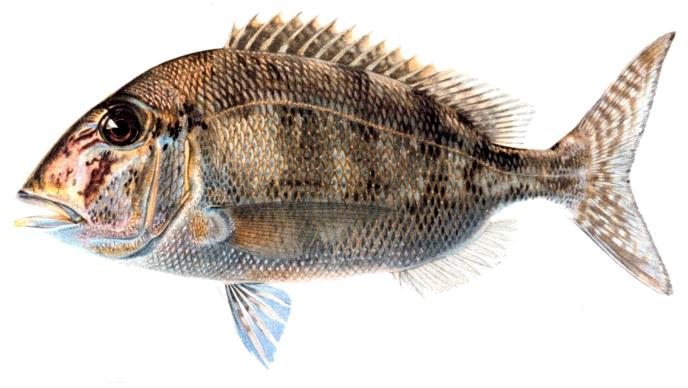
- Calamus bajonado

Scientific classification
- Kingdom: Animalia
- Phylum: Chordata
- Class: Actinopterygii
- Order: Acanthuriformes
- Family: Sparidae
- Genus: Calamus; Swainson, 1839

Type species
- Calamus megacephalus Swainson, 1839

Species
- see text

Synonyms
- Grammateus Poey, 1872

= Calamus (fish) =

Calamus Temporal range: 33–0 Ma Early Oligocene to Present

Genus of fishes

Calamus is a genus of marine ray-finned fishes belonging to the family Sparidae, the seabreams and porgies. Most of the species in this genus are found in the Western Atlantic Ocean, with 2 species occurring in the Eastern Pacific Ocean.

== Taxonomy ==
Calamus was first proposed as a monospecific genus in 1839 by the English zoologist William Swainson when he described Calamus megacephalus as its only species. The type locality of C. megacephalus was given as Martinique, it was later found to be a junior synonym of Pagellus calamus, described by Achille Valenciennes in 1830. This genus is placed in the family Sparidae within the order Spariformes by the 5th edition of Fishes of the World. Some authorities classify this genus in the subfamily Sparinae, but the 5th edition of Fishes of the World does not recognise subfamilies within the Sparidae.

== Etymology ==
Calamus means "quill", an allusion to what Swainson described as “the second anal-fin spine, hollow, shaped as a pen". The name of the senior synonym of the type species is, therefore, not a tautonym.

== Species ==
Calamus contains the fiollowing recognized species:

- Calamus arctifrons Goode & T. H. Bean, 1882 (Grass porgy)
- Calamus bajonado (Bloch & Schneider, 1801) (Jolthead porgy)
- Calamus brachysomus (Lockington, 1880) {Pacific porgy)
- Calamus calamus (Valenciennes, 1830) (Saucereye porgy)
- Calamus campechanus J. E. Randall and D. K. Caldwell, 1966 (Campeche porgy)
- Calamus cervigoni J. E. Randall and D. K. Caldwell, 1966 (Spotfin porgy)
- Calamus leucosteus D. S. Jordan & Gilbert, 1885
- Calamus mu J. E. Randall and D. K. Caldwell, 1966 (Flathead porgy)
- Calamus nodosus J. E. Randall and D. K. Caldwell, 1966 (Knobbed porgy)
- Calamus penna (Valenciennes, 1830) (Sheepshead porgy)
- Calamus pennatula Guichenot, 1868 (Pluma porgy)
- Calamus proridens Jordan & Gilbert, 1884 (Littlehead porgy)
- Calamus taurinus (Jenyns, 1840) (Galápagos porgy)

== Characteristics ==
Calamus porgies are characterized by having deep, compressed bodies and deep heads which has a steep dorsal profile and deep cheeks. The posterior nostrils are slits. The large mouth has fleshy lips and a large lower jaw. The suborbital bone overlaps the rear of the maxilla. There are 2 rows of teeth in the jaws, the teeth at the front are canine like and those in the rear resemble molars. The preoperculum has no serrations or spines on its margin. The dorsal fin is low and contains 13 spines while the anal fin is contains 3 spines. The pectoral fins are markedly longer than the pelvic fins. The cheeks and gill cover are scaled but the snout and space in front of the eyes are naked. The largest species in the genus is the jolthead porgy (C. bajonado) which has a maximum published fork length of 76 cm (30 in) while the smallest is the spotfin porgy (C. cervigoni) with a maximum published total length of 20 cm (7.9 in).

== Distribution ==
Calamus porgies are found in the Americas, 11 of the 13 species being found in the Western Atlantic Ocean and the other 2, C. brachysomus and C. taurinus, in the eastern Pacific Ocean.

== Fisheries ==
Calamus porgies are valued as food fishes and are important quarry species for both commercial and recreational fisheries.
