= List of Air episodes =

Air anime Region A Blu-ray Disc box set released by Pony Canyon

The Air anime series is based on the visual novel Air by the Japanese visual novel brand Key. The episodes, produced by the animation studio Kyoto Animation, are directed by Tatsuya Ishihara, written by Fumihiko Shimo, and features character design by Tomoe Aratani who based the designs on Itaru Hinoue's original concept. The story follows the main character Yukito Kunisaki, a traveler who arrives in a quiet seaside town during summer since he does not have any more money to continue on his journey for now. He is on a search for the "girl in the sky" that his now-deceased mother told him about and was searching for too; Yukito has taken it upon himself to find this girl to finish his mother's journey. In town, Yukito meets three strange girls early on named Misuzu Kamio, Kano Kirishima, and Minagi Tohno, and Yukito begins to suspect that one of them may in fact be the girl he has been searching for.

Thirteen episodes were produced by Kyoto Animation: twelve regular episodes, and a final recap episode which summarizes Misuzu's story arc. On November 17, 2004, a teaser DVD named "Air prelude" was produced containing interviews with the cast, clean opening and ending sequences, and promotional footage of the anime itself. It was a limited edition DVD, with only 20,000 copies produced. The episodes aired between January 6 and March 31, 2005, on the BS-i Japanese television network. After the conclusion of the anime series, a mini-series which added to the Summer arc of the story called Air in Summer aired on August 28 and September 4, 2005, a week later on BS-i. Air in Summer consisted of two episodes and was produced by the same staff as the anime series.

A DVD released on March 31, 2005, called "Air Memories" contained promotional commercials for the series, staff commentaries, and clean ending sequences from the twelfth and thirteenth episodes, lasting ninety-two minutes in total. The episodes were released to six Region 2 DVDs between April 6 and September 7, 2005, by Pony Canyon in limited and regular editions containing two episodes per volume. A single DVD volume for Air in Summer was released on October 5, 2005, in Japan in limited and regular editions. Additionally, Air became one of the first anime series to be released in Blu-ray Disc format on December 22, 2006. A new version of the Blu-ray Disc box set was released on November 28, 2008, in Japan.

The twelve main episodes and two Air in Summer episodes were licensed for North American distribution by ADV Films. The episodes were released on four DVD compilations between August 14, 2007, and November 27, 2007. The second DVD volume was sold in two editions, with the difference between the two being a series box all four DVDs could fit inside. In July 2008, the license for the anime series and film was transferred to Funimation continued to produce them in North America in English. Funimation released a three-disc series box set of the Air anime on April 21, 2009.

Two pieces of theme music are used for the episodes; one opening theme and one ending theme. The opening theme is "Tori no Uta" (鳥の詩, Bird's Poem), and the ending theme is "Farewell song"; both songs are sung by Lia and were the original opening and ending themes from the visual novel. The rest of the soundtrack for the anime series is sampled from the visual novel's original soundtrack. This includes one insert song used near the end of episode twelve, "Aozora" (青空, Blue Skies), which is also sung by Lia, and was originally an insert song from the visual novel.

== Air ==
No.	Title	Directed by	Written by	Original release date	English air date
1	"~Breeze~"; Transliteration: "Kaze" (Japanese: かぜ)	Tatsuya Ishihara	Fumihiko Shimo	January 6, 2005	August 14, 2007
Yukito Kunisaki arrives to the town in hopes of making money for food with his puppet show. He meets Misuzu Kamio, a strange girl living in the town. Misuzu manages to lure Yukito to her house with food at which after a discussion she offers him residence. Soon after, Haruko Kamio, Misuzu's foster mother, arrives to the house. Haruko initially opposes Yukito's stay but later decides to allow him to stay in the shed.
2	"~Town~"; Transliteration: "Machi" (Japanese: まち)	Yutaka Yamamoto	Fumihiko Shimo	January 13, 2005	August 14, 2007
Yukito explains to Misuzu the quest of the girl with wings that has been in his family for generations. The next day, Yukito's puppet show only manages to attract a dog named Potato, while scaring others. While performing in front of her clinic, Yukito is caught by Hijiri Kirishima, who offers him work doing odd jobs.
3	"~Whisper~"; Transliteration: "Koe" (Japanese: こえ)	Yasuhiro Takemoto	Fumihiko Shimo	January 20, 2005	August 14, 2007
The surroundings of Yukito and Misuzu briefly change from the shrine to a cropland as a result of Kano's experience. After a confrontation with Hijiri, Yukito and others briefly go to the clinic. Yukito and Misuzu leave the clinic for home. On their way, Yukito realizes he was not paid for his part time job and sneaks back into the clinic only to overhear a puzzling conversation.
4	"~Plume~"; Transliteration: "Hane" (Japanese: はね)	Noriyuki Kitanohara	Fumihiko Shimo	January 27, 2005	August 14, 2007
Kano strangles Yukito in her trance-like state near the shrine hard enough to leave a mark before falling unconscious. Back at the clinic, Hijiri apologizes for Kano's behavior and explains when and how Kano's unusual symptoms started, with a single bright feather at the shrine.
5	"~Wing~"; Transliteration: "Tsubasa" (Japanese: つばさ)	Yutaka Yamamoto	Fumihiko Shimo	February 3, 2005	September 25, 2007
Yukito ends up spending the day with Minagi and Michiru while Misuzu is at school. Yukito walks Minagi home after being invited to go stargazing on the school's rooftop when he first learns of her mother's mental illness. Later, Misuzu attempts to play cards with Yukito, but is overcome with extreme pain. When Yukito learns of Misuzu's condition he decides to move out of the house.
6	"~Star~"; Transliteration: "Hoshi" (Japanese: ほし)	Tatsuya Ishihara	Fumihiko Shimo	February 10, 2005	September 25, 2007
After Minagi's mother's mental condition has caused her to forget she has a daughter, Minagi leaves home and joins Yukito. Yukito tells Minagi he's leaving town and wants her to come with him, but instead leads her back home to face her mother. Michiru is invited to eat at Minagi's house. Michiru leaves, having fulfilled her purpose. The next day Yukito goes to Misuzu's house only to find Misuzu collapsed on the ground.
7	"~Dream~"; Transliteration: "Yume" (Japanese: ゆめ)	Noriyuki Kitanohara	Fumihiko Shimo	February 17, 2005	September 25, 2007
There are a number of flashbacks that Yukito has of his mother telling him about the girl with wings, about how she will forget everything and die when she dreams her final dream, and about how the person close to her will also die. Misuzu's foster mother leaves, leaving Yukito and Misuzu alone. Misuzu tells Yukito about her last dream, and Yukito comes to the decision to stay by her side, knowing the consequences. Yukito suddenly disappears and after Misuzu wakes up feeling better, she wonders where Yukito has gone or if he will come back.
8	"~Summer~"; Transliteration: "Natsu" (Japanese: なつ)	Yutaka Yamamoto	Fumihiko Shimo	February 24, 2005	September 25, 2007
This story takes place 1000 years prior to the rest of the story. Kanna is a girl with wings confined to a palace with a friend, Uraha, and body guard, Ryūya. When Kanna is to be sent to another temple, the three escape and go on a journey to find Kanna's mother. Meanwhile, the palace is attacked and the three are pursued. They finally find Kanna's mother but she tells them to leave.
9	"~Moon~"; Transliteration: "Tsuki" (Japanese: つき)	Tomoe Aratani	Fumihiko Shimo	March 3, 2005	October 30, 2007
Kanna's mother claims to be "tainted". They all escape from the mountain but their pursuers manage to kill Kanna's mother. Before she dies, she passes the ancient prayer to Kanna. While the pursuers are closing in, the three talk about settling down near the ocean, but Kanna knows this is only a dream. She takes flight but the monks curse her and she is killed by the soldiers. Ryūya and Uraha learn about the curse and Kanna's suffering and vow to end it by having a child who will break the curse.
10	"~Light~"; Transliteration: "Hikari" (Japanese: ひかり)	Noriyuki Kitanohara	Fumihiko Shimo	March 10, 2005	October 30, 2007
The events of the earlier story involving Misuzu are retold from the point of view of a crow Misuzu found and named Sora.
11	"~Sea~"; Transliteration: "Umi" (Japanese: うみ)	Yoshiji Kigami	Fumihiko Shimo	March 17, 2005	October 30, 2007
Misuzu's curse is getting more serious. Soon, she has forgotten who Haruko is and begins to act strangely, playing cards by herself and not wanting to go outdoors. Haruko is depressed, but tries hard to restore the memories Misuzu lost. Soon, however, Misuzu's birth father shows up, and tries to claim Misuzu back from Haruko, deciding to let Misuzu decide who she wants to live with. Haruko, desperate because of Misuzu's memory loss, begs him to let her have Misuzu for three more days, to which he agrees.
12	"~Air~"; Transliteration: "Sora" (Japanese: そら)	Tatsuya Ishihara	Fumihiko Shimo	March 24, 2005	October 30, 2007
The summer festival has finally arrived, but unfortunately it rains that day and thus the festival is canceled. Wanting to do anything she can for Misuzu, Haruko brings her to the local shrine. As mother and daughter bond further, Misuzu continues to weaken and eventually dies in Haruko's arms at the beach. Two familiar kids on the beach are shown; implied to be Yukito and Misuzu's reincarnations.
13	"Highlights"; Transliteration: "Sōshūhen" (Japanese: 総集編)	Tatsuya Ishihara	Fumihiko Shimo	March 31, 2005	November 27, 2007
This is a recap of Misuzu Kamio's story arc.

== Air in Summer ==
No.	Title	Directed by	Written by	Original release date
1	"~Mountain path~" Transliteration: "Yamamichi" (Japanese: やまみち)	Tatsuya Ishihara	Fumihiko Shimo	August 28, 2005
The events of the Summer arc are retold from the escape from the shrine to before the mountain. These events also include scenes not shown in the original Summer arc.
2	"~Universe~"; Transliteration: "Ametsuchi" (Japanese: あめつち)	Tatsuya Ishihara	Fumihiko Shimo	September 4, 2005
The relationship between Ryūya and Kanna is explored more showing their bond to be more romantic than platonic in nature.
