= John Plumb =

John Plumb may be:

- John Plumb (painter) (1927–2008), British abstract painter
- John Plumb (politician) (1846–1891), Australian politician
- John F. Plumb, American aerospace engineer and politician
- John H. Plumb (1911–2001), British historian
- John Plumbe (sometimes Plumb; 1809–1857), Welsh-born American photographer, gallerist, and publisher
