= Pluma de Pato =

- Municipality and village
- Location within Argentina
- Coordinates: 23°23′S 63°06′W
- Country: Argentina
- Province: Salta Province
- Elevation: 211 m (692 ft)

Population (2001)
  - Total: 220
- Time zone: UTC−3 (ART)
- Postal code: A4554

Pluma de Pato (Spanish for "Feather"' Latin: plūma "feather" and Andalusian Arabic: páṭṭ for "duck") is a village and rural municipality in Salta Province in northwestern Argentina.
