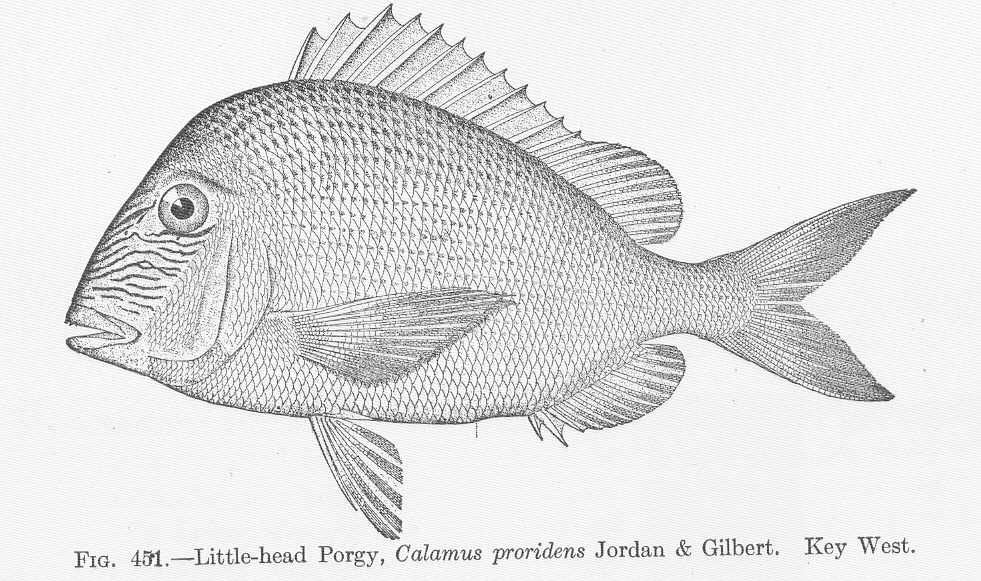

Conservation status
- Least Concern (IUCN 3.1)

Scientific classification
- Kingdom: Animalia
- Phylum: Chordata
- Class: Actinopterygii
- Order: Acanthuriformes
- Family: Sparidae
- Genus: Calamus
- Species: C. proridens

Binomial name
- Calamus proridens D. S. Jordan & Gilbert, 1884

= Littlehead porgy =

Species of fish

The littlehead porgy (Calamus proridens) is a species of marine ray-finned fish belonging to the family Sparidae, the seabreams and porgies. They are only found in the western portion of the tropical Atlantic Ocean, where they are often caught and used as food.

== Taxonomy ==
The Littlehead porgy was first formally described in 1884 by the Ichthyologists David Starr Jordan and Charles Henry Gilbert with its type locality given as Key West in Florida. The genus Calamus is placed in the family Sparidae within the order Spariformes by the 5th edition of Fishes of the World. Some authorities classify this genus in the subfamily Sparinae, but the 5th edition of Fishes of the World does not recognise subfamilies within the Sparidae.

== Etymology ==
The littlehead porgy has the specific name proridens which is combination of prora, meaning prow" and dens, which means "teeth". This is an allusion to the large canine-like teeth on either side of the upper jaw in adults, these are diagonally pointing downwards and outwards.

== Description ==
While maturing, Littlehead porgies usually reach between 17 and 22 cm in length. Fully grown adults are commonly 37 cm, although they have been recorded to grow up to 46 cm. When compared to other members of their genus, they can be distinguished by having small scales, and relatively deep bodies with steep profiles. The molar-like teeth, that all porgies have, are more similar to canines in this species. Littlehead porgies are generally silver in color, with violet spots on their scales that form stripes on their upper bodies. These stripes are then crossed by darker bars of color. The Littlehead porgy has been described as one of the most brightly colored members of the porgy family, which contains well over 100 species in 37 genera.

== Distribution and habitat ==
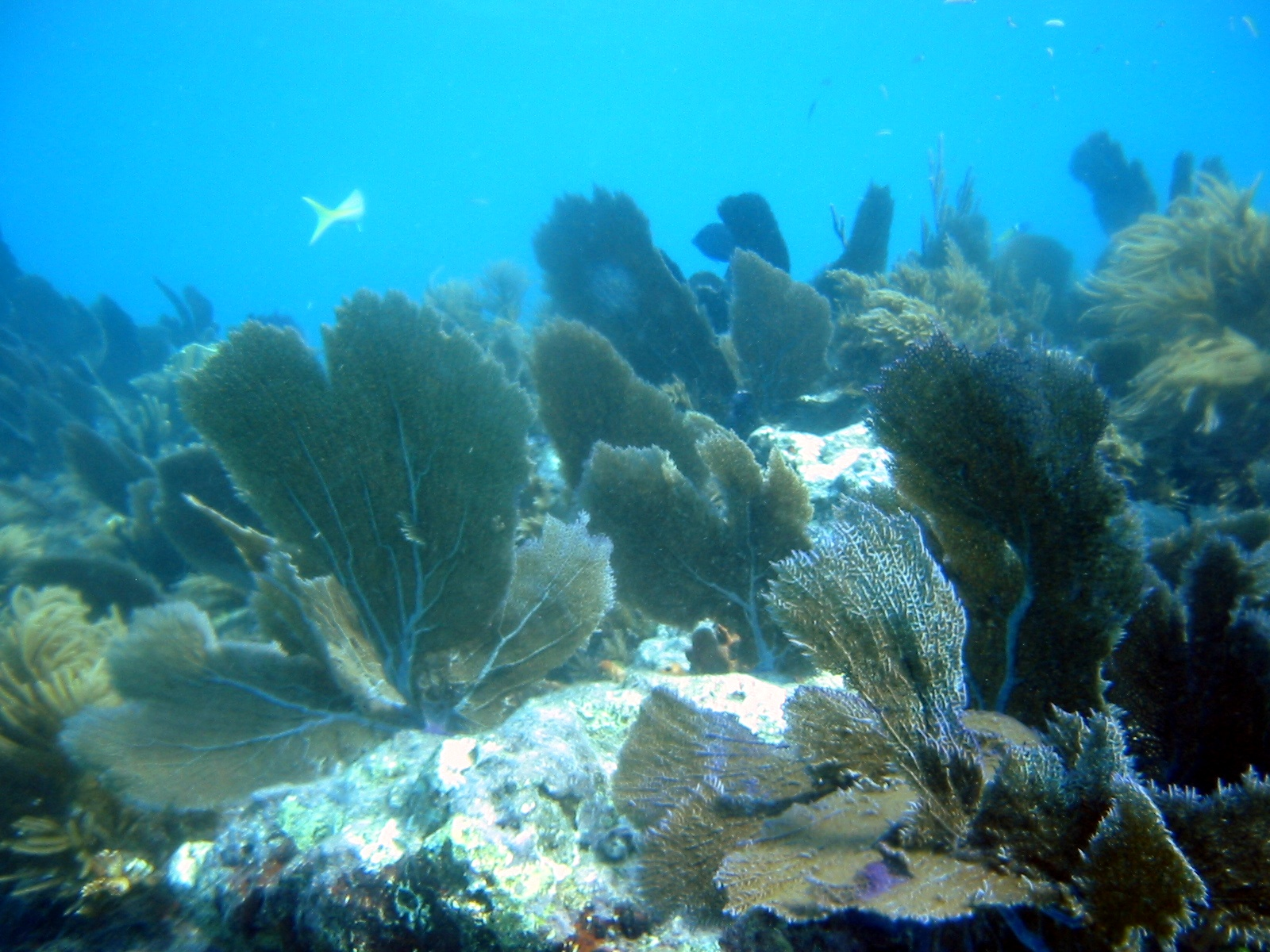
Littlehead porgies are often found near coral reefs, such as this one near Key Largo.

Known only from the western Atlantic Ocean, Littlehead porgies are found off the northeast coast of Florida and in the northern Gulf of Mexico and the Caribbean, south to the Bay of Campeche, which lies to the west of the Yucatan Peninsula, and northern South America. They are normally associated with reefs, and can be found on hard spongey or coral bottoms where they feed primarily on invertebrates, such as crustaceans, and often migrate cyclically between feeding and spawning grounds. The Littlehead porgy can be preyed upon by seabirds such as the Sooty tern.
