= Lois Plumb =

Canadian psychiatrist

Dr. Lois Marion Plumb
- Born: March 24, 1924; Brussels, Ontario, Canada
- Died: December 8, 2002 (aged 78)
- Education: Western University (M.D., 1946), University of Toronto (Diploma, 1953)
- Occupation: Psychiatrist
- Years active: 1946–1997
- Employer(s): Canadian Women’s Army Corps, Women’s College Hospital, University of Toronto, Ottawa Civic Hospital, Victoria Hospital

Lois Marion Plumb (March 24, 1924 – December 8, 2002) was a Canadian psychiatrist. Plumb was the first Chief of Psychiatry at Toronto’s Women's College Hospital.

== Early life and education ==
Plumb was born in Brussels, Ontario on March 24, 1924. She attended Western University from 1942-1946, graduating with a medical degree from the Faculty of Medicine in 1946. She also served as a private in the Canadian Women's Army Corps from 1944–1946. According to her obituary in the Toronto Star, it was while she was volunteering at a veteran’s hospital in London that she became interested in psychiatry.

After obtaining her medical degree, she completed internships at Ottawa Civic Hospital (1946–1947) and Victoria Hospital, London, Ontario (1947–1948). From 1951-1953, Plumb completed post-graduate training at hospitals in Toronto. In 1953, she received a Diploma in Psychiatry from the University of Toronto.

== Career ==
Plumb joined the Department of Medicine at Women's College Hospital in 1956, where she worked as a specialist in psychiatry. Women’s College Hospital hired Plumb to lead the expansion of its inpatient and outpatient psychiatric services. In 1961, the Hospital established a Department of Psychiatry and named Plumb as its first Chief of Psychiatry. During her tenure, she expanded the size of the department and increased the diversity of programs available to women during different stages of life. She held the position of Chief of Psychiatry until 1973. After stepping down as Chief, Plumb remained a staff member in the Department of Psychiatry at Women's College Hospital until her retirement in 1997.

Plumb also served as a visiting lecturer and a clinical teacher at the University of Toronto’s Department of Psychiatry, where her writings cautioned against viewing pregnancy as solely a “biological event.” She warned that by only focusing on anatomy and physiology, the emotional aspects of pregnancy are often overlooked. She explained that, for many women, pregnancy and motherhood can bring with it great psychological strain, including stress, depression, irritability, fatigue, and fear.

In addition to working at Women's College Hospital, Plumb opened a private medical practice in the 1960s, which she ran until her death.

== Personal life ==
In 1954, Lois Plumb married Arthur Detwiler, a psychologist. The couple had two children.

== Memberships ==
She was a member of several associations, including: the Ontario Medical Association, the Ontario Psychiatric Association and the Canadian Psychiatric Association.
