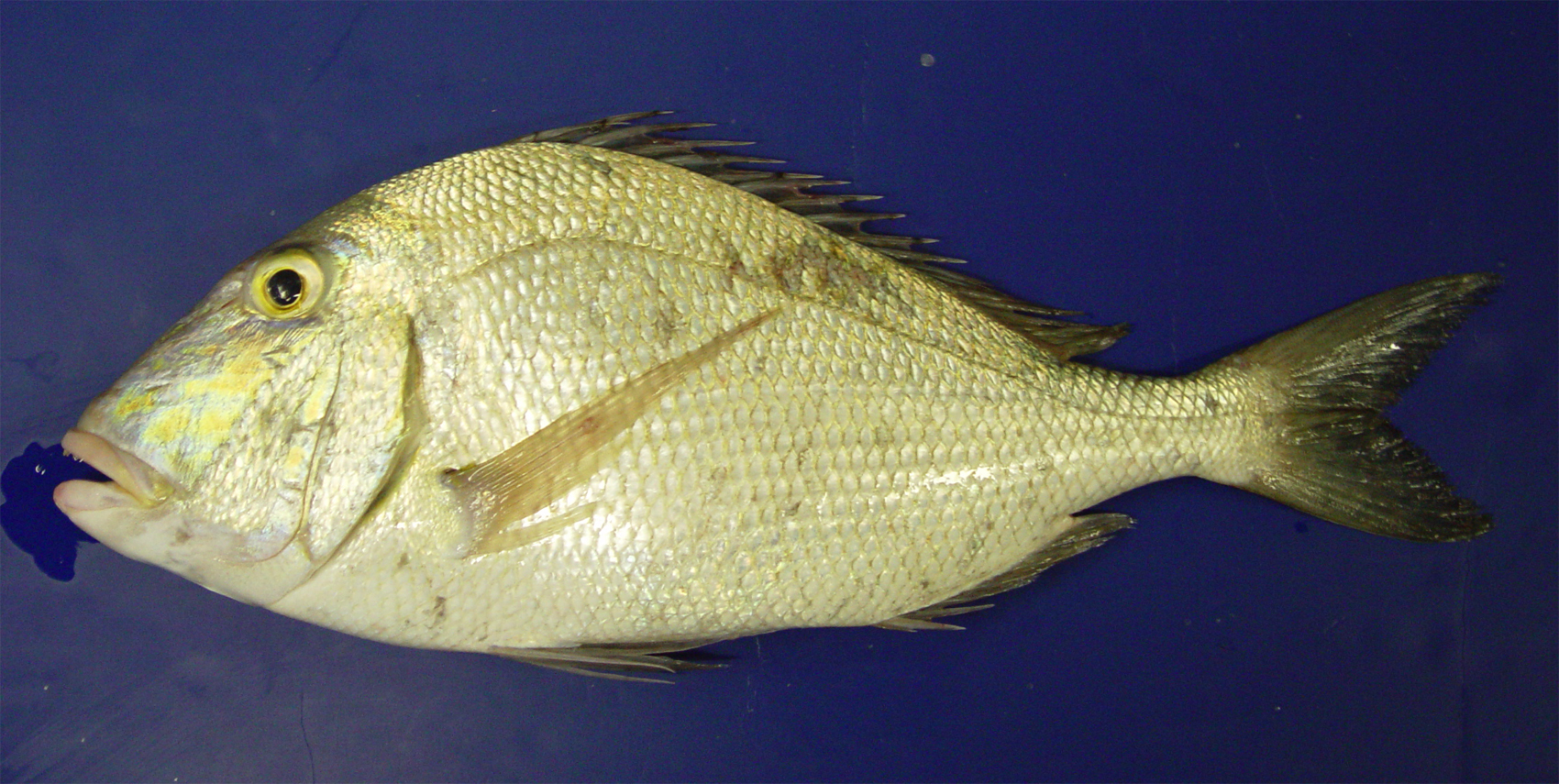

Conservation status
- Least Concern (IUCN 3.1)

Scientific classification
- Kingdom: Animalia
- Phylum: Chordata
- Class: Actinopterygii
- Order: Acanthuriformes
- Family: Sparidae
- Genus: Calamus
- Species: C. calamus

Binomial name
- Calamus calamus (Valenciennes, 1830)

Synonyms
- Pagellus calamus (Valenciennes, 1830); Chrysophrys (Calamus) megacephalus Swainson, 1839; Pagellus orbitarius Poey, 1860

= Saucereye porgy =

Species of fish

The saucereye porgy (Calamus calamus) is an ocean-going species of fish in the family Sparidae. In Bermuda, they are also known as the goat's head porgy. In Jamaica, they are known as the Porgi grunt and the sugareye porgy. They may also be known simply by the name Porgy in several other Caribbean islands. Saucereye porgies are considered to be minor gamefishes and when caught are marketed both fresh and frozen.

== Taxonomy and naming ==
The Saucereye porgy was first described by the French zoologist, Achille Valenciennes in a 22-volume work entitled Histoire naturelle des poissons (Natural History of Fishes), which was a collaboration with fellow zoologist, Georges Cuvier. It was first described as Pagellus calamus, being placed in the genus Pagellus. It was since moved into Calamus, this name means "quill", in an allusion to what William Swainson described as "the second anal-fin spine, hollow, shaped as a pen" when he proposed the genus Calamus.

== Description ==
Saucereye porgies can grow up to 56 cm in length, but normally they are 30 to 45 cm long. Though some sources state that they can weigh up to 3 lbs, the largest record is only half that: 1.5 lbs. The cheek area is blue with yellow spots; there is also a dark blue smudge behind the upper gill opening.

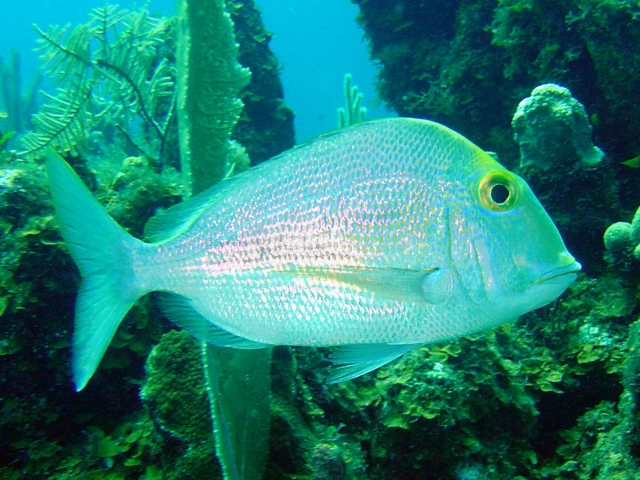
C. calamus in its natural habitat: A reef setting near Isla Juventud, Cuba.

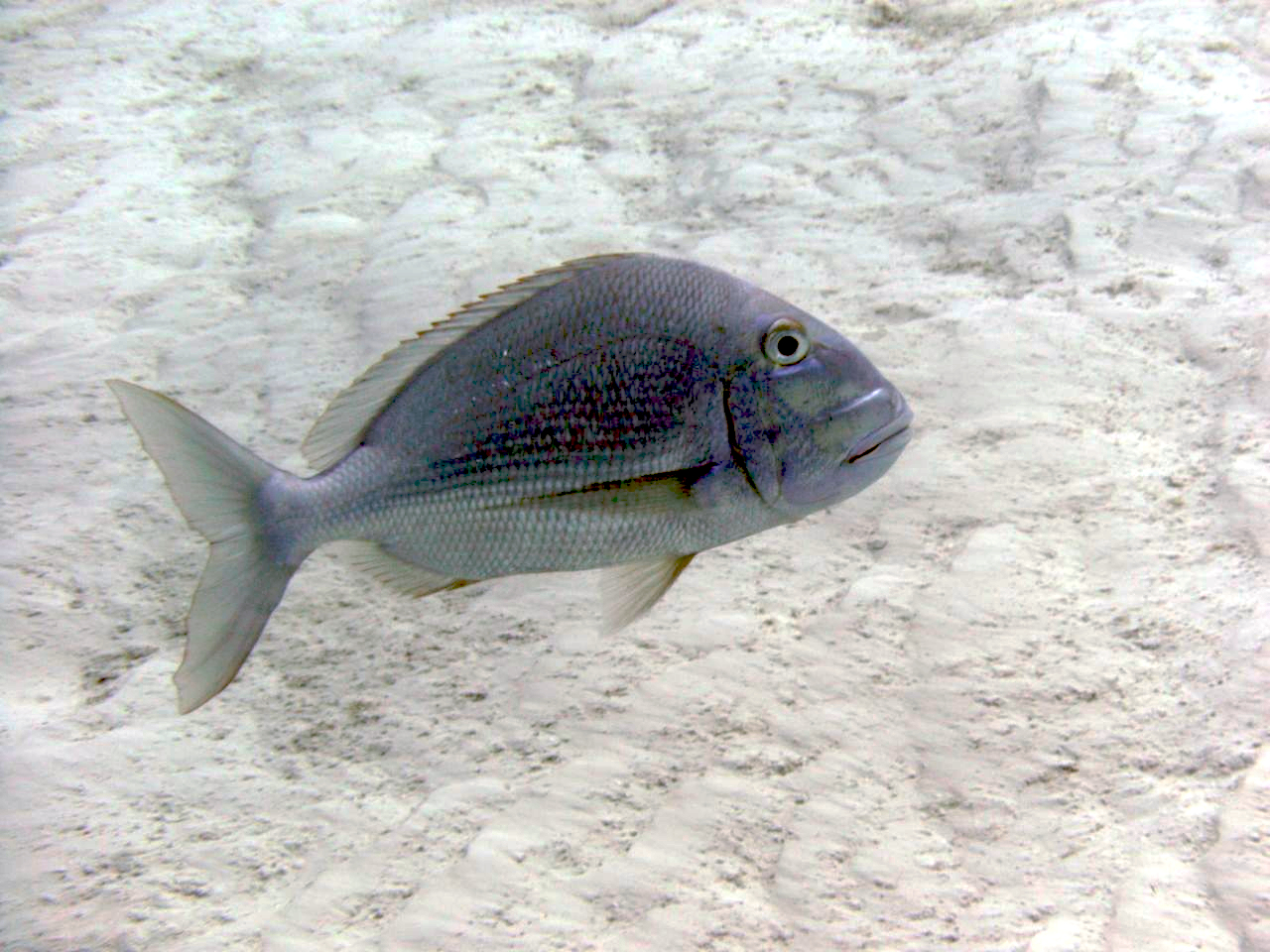
C. calamus swimming over flats in Cozumel, Mexico.

== Distribution and habitat ==
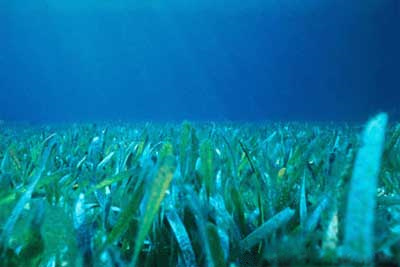
A bed of sea grass off the coast of Florida.

Saucereyes are found only in the western Atlantic Ocean—from North Carolina, east to Bermuda, and south to Brazil. They are most common around the cities of Key West and Havana. Adults are commonly found around coral reefs, where they are easily approached by divers, while juveniles are common to beds of sea grass (mainly Thalassia). Saucereyes feed on a variety of animals, such as mollusks, sea worms, brittle stars, hermit crabs, crabs and sea urchins.

== Relationship with humans ==
The Saurcereye porgy is mostly eaten by people in the West Indies, where it is most often caught. These fishes are also considered to be of minor commercial importance to the region, despite the occasional danger of ciguatera poisoning during red tide events. They are usually marketed fresh or frozen.
