= Plumer (disambiguation) =

Plumer is a surname.

Plumer may also refer to:

== People ==
- Viscount Plumer, a British peerage title
- Baron Plumer, a British nobility title

== Places ==
- Plumer Barracks, Plymouth, England, UK; formerly Crownhill Barracks, a former British military barracks
- Plumer Block, Franklin, Venango County, Pennsylvania, USA; an NRHP-listed building that burned down; also called the Hancock Building
- Plumer House, West Newton, Westmoreland County, Pennsylvania, USA; an NRHP-listed building

== See also ==
- Hanna v. Plumer (1965), a decision by the Supreme Court of the United States
- Taylor v Plumer (1815), an English trusts law case in the UK
- nom de plume, pen-name, pseudonym
- Plume hunting
- Plume (disambiguation)
- Plum (disambiguation)
- Plummer (disambiguation)
- Plumber (disambiguation)
