= Plumber (disambiguation) =

A plumber is a tradesperson who specialises in installing and maintaining systems used for potable (drinking) water, sewage, drainage, or industrial process plant piping.

Plumber may also refer to:

- The Plumber (1933 film), a 1933 animated short featuring Oswald the Lucky Rabbit
- The Plumber (1979 film), a 1979 Australian television film
- "The Plumber" (Trumpton), a 1967 television episode
- White House Plumbers, a White House Special Investigations Unit
- White House Plumbers (miniseries), a TV series about Watergate
- A nickname for Jean-Luc Dehaene, Belgian prime minister 1992–1999
- A video game for the Vii and VG Pocket Caplet

== See also ==
- Plumbing
- Plumb (disambiguation)
- Plummer (disambiguation)
- Plumer (disambiguation)
- Plum (disambiguation)
