= Plummer =

Plummer may refer to:

== Places ==
=== Communities ===
- Plummer, Idaho, United States
- Plummer, Indiana, United States
- Plummer, Minnesota, United States
- Plummer Additional, Ontario, Canada

=== Buildings ===
- Plummer Building, Rochester, Minnesota, United States
- Plummer Memorial Library, Newton, Massachusetts, United States

=== Streets and parks ===
- Plummer Park, West Hollywood, California, United States
- Plummer Avenue, historic district in New Waterford, Nova Scotia, Canada

=== Natural landmarks ===
- Plummer (crater), impact crater on the Moon
- Plummer Glacier, Heritage Range, Antarctica
- Plummer Peak, Tatoosh Range, Washington, United States

== Medicine ==
- Plummer's nail, separation of the nail from the nail bed
- Plummer syndrome, development of a toxic nodular goiter
- Plummer–Vinson syndrome, a human disorder linked to iron deficiency anemia
- Henry Stanley Plummer, an American internist and endocrinologist

== Other ==
- Plummer E. Jefferis (1851–1925), American politician from Pennsylvania
- Plummer (surname)
- Plummer block, method of mounting bearings on a rotating shaft
- Plummer House (disambiguation), any of several historic houses
- Plummer model, mathematical model in dynamical systems
- Plummer Terrier, breed of dog

== See also ==
- Plumer (disambiguation)
- Plumber (disambiguation)
- Plum (disambiguation)
