= Plummer House =

Plummer House may refer to:

- Plummer House (Beebe, Arkansas), listed on the NRHP in Arkansas
- John A. Plummer House, Marianna, AR, listed on the NRHP in Arkansas
- Capt. John Plummer House, Addison, ME, listed on the NRHP in Maine
- Plummer House (Rochester, Minnesota), listed on the NRHP in Minnesota as "Henry S. Plummer House"
- Plummer Homestead, Milton, NH, listed on the NRHP in New Hampshire
- Amos and Lillie Plummer House, Hillsboro, ND, listed on the NRHP in North Dakota
- Baty-Plummer House, Paris, TX, listed on the NRHP in Texas
