= African plum =

African plum may refer to:

- Dacryodes edulis, African pear, a fruit tree native to Africa
- Prunus africana, African cherry, a tree native to central and southern Africa

== See also ==
- Plum (disambiguation)
