= Plumb =

Plumb may refer to:

== Arts and entertainment ==
- Plumb, a 1995 album by Jonatha Brooke & The Story
- Plumb (Plumb album), 1997
- Plumb (Field Music album), 2012
- Plumb (novel series), 1978–1983 novel series by Maurice Gee
- Plumb (poetry collection), by Romanian poet George Bacovia

== People ==
- Plumb (surname)
- Plumb (singer), stage name of American singer-songwriter Tiffany Arbuckle Lee (born 1975)

== Places in the United States ==
- Plumb Beach, Brooklyn, New York City, New York, a beach and neighborhood
- Plumb Branch, Missouri, a stream
- Plumb Brook, New York

== Tools ==
- Plumb bob, a type of tool
- Plumb (tools), a brand of tools known for its hammers

== Other uses ==
- Plumb Lane, an arterial road in Reno, Nevada
- Plumb Memorial Library, a historic public library in Shelton, Connecticut

== See also ==
- Plumb House (disambiguation)
- Plumbing
- Plumbo, a Norwegian band
- Plum (disambiguation)
- Plummet (disambiguation)
