= Plummet =

Plummet may refer to:

- Plumb bob, a weighted line used as a vertical reference
- Sinker (fishing)
- Plummet (musicians), a trance duo
- Plummet (novel), by Sherwin Tjia (2020)

== See also ==
- Plumb (disambiguation)
