= West Newton, Pennsylvania =

Borough in Pennsylvania, US

- Borough
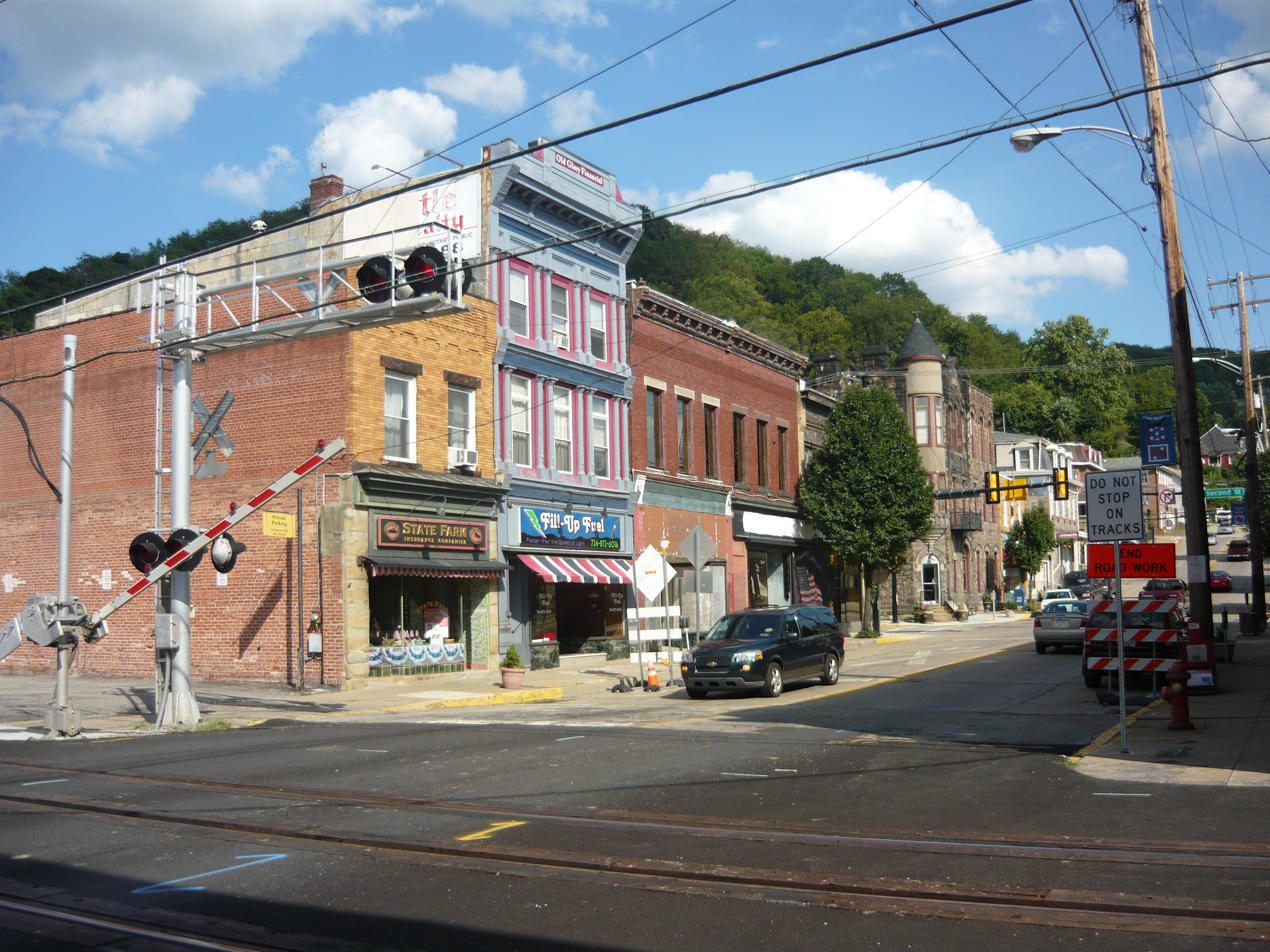
- East Main Street

- Location of West Newton in Westmoreland County, Pennsylvania.

- Location within Pennsylvania
- Coordinates: 40°12′34″N 79°46′09″W
- Country: United States
- State: Pennsylvania
- County: Westmoreland
- Settled: 1788
- Incorporated: February 26, 1842

Government
  - Type: Borough Council
  - Mayor: Mary Popovich

Area
  - Total: 1.12 sq mi (2.91 km^{2})
  - Land: 1.04 sq mi (2.69 km^{2})
  - Water: 0.085 sq mi (0.22 km^{2})
- Elevation: 777 ft (237 m)

Population (2010)
  - Total: 2,633
  - Estimate (2019): 2,480
  - Density: 2,391.0/sq mi (923.17/km^{2})
- Time zone: UTC-5 (Eastern (EST))
  - Summer (DST): UTC-4 (EDT)
- Zip code: 15089
- Area codes: 724, 878
- FIPS code: 42-83680
- Website: Borough website

West Newton, located 24.5 miles (39.4 km) southeast of Pittsburgh, is a borough in Westmoreland County in the U.S. state of Pennsylvania. Formerly, the manufacture of radiators and boilers were the chief industries. As of the 2020 census, West Newton had a population of 2,665.

== History ==
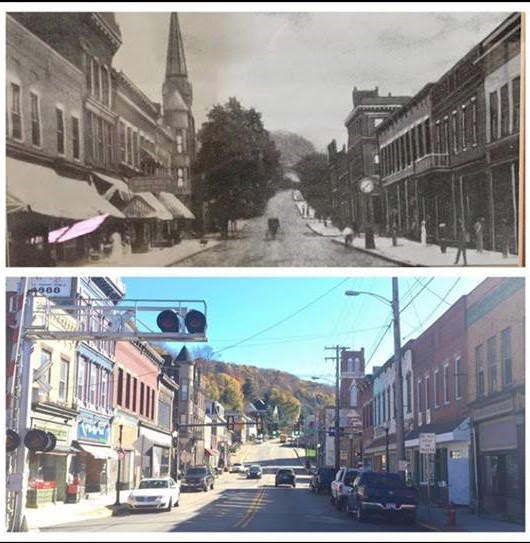

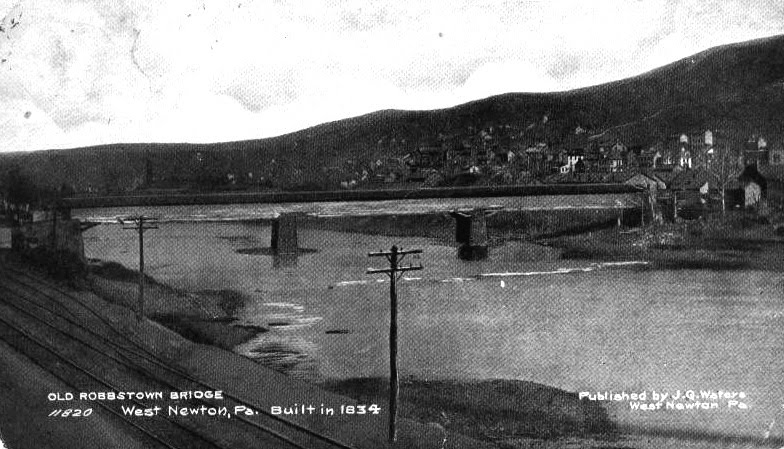

The town traces its roots to 1788, when a group of American pioneers to the Northwest Territory led by Gen. Rufus Putnam traveled overland from Massachusetts and stopped at this location to build boats. They then set out down the Youghiogheny River to the Monogahela and Ohio Rivers, ending their journey and founding the town of Marietta, Ohio. Former names of the town are Simeral's Ferry (also, Sumrill's Ferry), Oswegly (Sewickley) Old Town, and Robbstown. Eighteen miners lost their lives in West Newton in 1901 at the Port Royal Mine.

The Dick Building and Plumer House are listed on the National Register of Historic Places.

Like many pioneer towns in Western Pennsylvania, West Newton earned its early historical relevance by playing a key role in the westward expansion of the United States. The Simerals were the first family to operate in this area and operated a small ferry on the Youghiogheny River halfway between Connellsville and McKeesport. A New Jersey native and whiskey rebel named Isaac Robb, laid out the town of West Newton; however, it was originally called "Robbstown". The town grew slowly as the community served as a trading outpost where the Old Glades Indian trail met the Youghiogheny River.

West Newton's fortunes changed during the mid 19th century. River commerce increased with the construction of slack water dams in the 1830s. The introduction of the Pittsburgh, Connellsvile, and Markles Paper Mill provided early economic developments.

Despite facing devastating fires, floods and tragic train wrecks in the 20th century, the people of West Newton persevered, continuing to develop both the infrastructure and economy of their community. West Newton eventually transitioned into a bedroom community with a vast majority of residents working outside of the borough's limits. The community saw new economic life blood, serving as a trail town along the Great Allegheny Passage for visitors around the world.

== Geography ==
West Newton is located at 40°12′34″N 79°46′9″W (40.209378, -79.769157).

According to the United States Census Bureau, the borough has a total area of 1.2 square miles (3.1 km^{2}), of which 1.1 square miles (2.8 km^{2}) is land and 0.1 square miles (0.26 km^{2}) (8.13%) is water.

== Demographics ==
Historical population
Census	Pop.	Note	%±
1850	771		—
1860	949		23.1%
1870	992		4.5%
1880	1,475		48.7%
1890	2,285		54.9%
1900	2,467		8.0%
1910	2,880		16.7%
1920	2,645		−8.2%
1930	2,953		11.6%
1940	2,765		−6.4%
1950	3,619		30.9%
1960	3,982		10.0%
1970	3,648		−8.4%
1980	3,387		−7.2%
1990	3,152		−6.9%
2000	3,083		−2.2%
2010	2,633		−14.6%
2020	2,665		1.2%

As of the census of 2000, there were 3,083 people, 1,318 households, and 830 families residing in the borough. The population density was 2,717.5 inhabitants per square mile (1,049.2/km^{2}). There were 1,410 housing units at an average density of 1,242.8 per square mile (479.8/km^{2}). The racial makeup of the borough was 97.50% White, 1.14% African American, 0.16% Native American, 0.23% Asian, 0.16% from other races, and 0.81% from two or more races. Hispanic or Latino of any race were 0.42% of the population.

There were 1,318 households, out of which 26.4% had children under the age of 18 living with them, 47.1% were married couples living together, 12.1% had a female householder with no husband present, and 37.0% were non-families. 34.4% of all households were made up of individuals, and 20.4% had someone living alone who was 65 years of age or older. The average household size was 2.31 and the average family size was 2.98.

In the borough the population was spread out, with 21.3% under the age of 18, 7.6% from 18 to 24, 27.6% from 25 to 44, 22.2% from 45 to 64, and 21.3% who were 65 years of age or older. The median age was 42 years. For every 100 females there were 86.4 males. For every 100 females age 18 and over, there were 83.5 males.

The median income for a household in the borough was $25,912, and the median income for a family was $41,063. Males had a median income of $36,386 versus $22,727 for females. The per capita income for the borough was $16,406. About 7.5% of families and 10.5% of the population were below the poverty line, including 13.3% of those under age 18 and 10.7% of those age 65 or over.

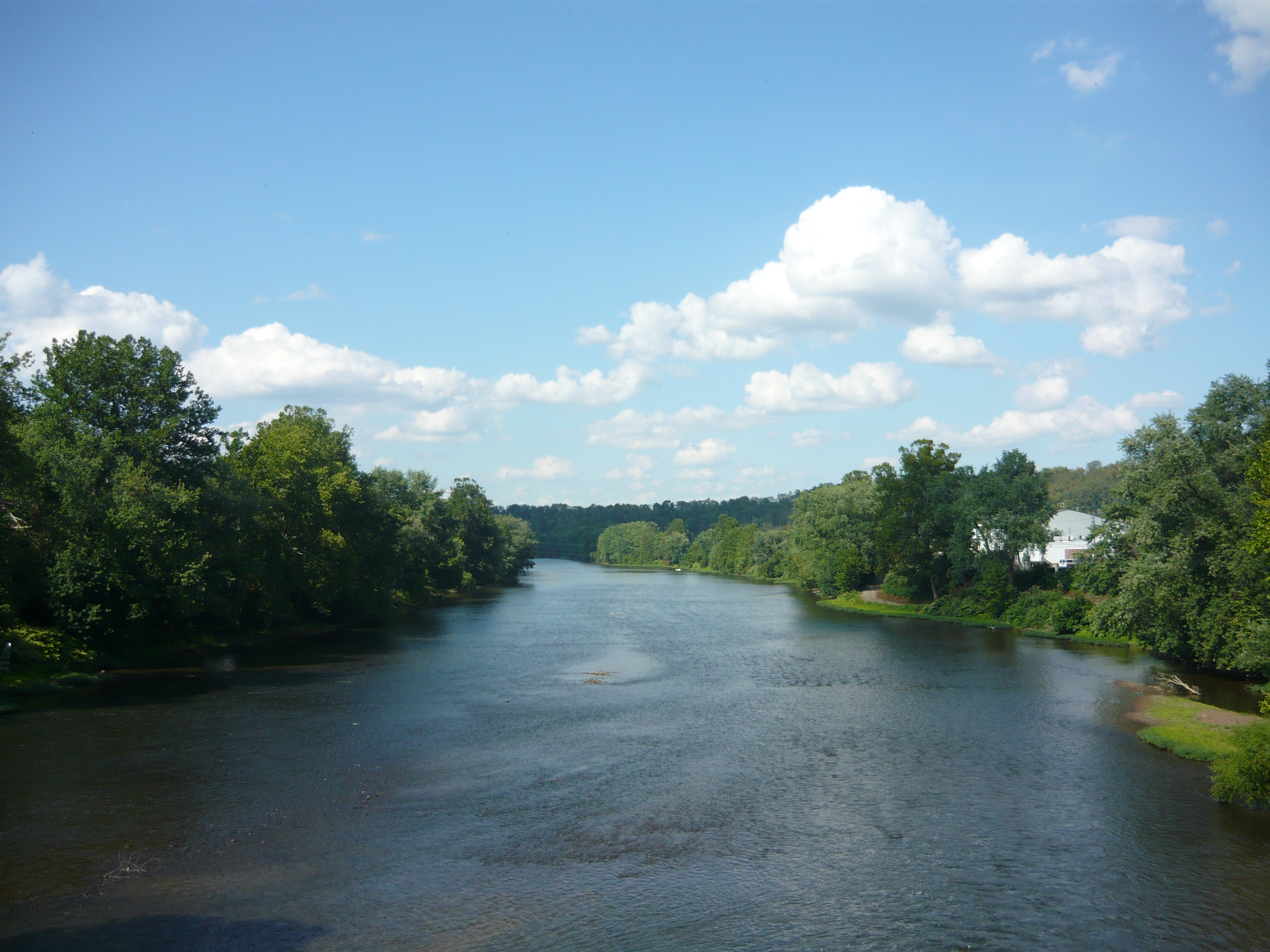
Youghiogheny River at West Newton

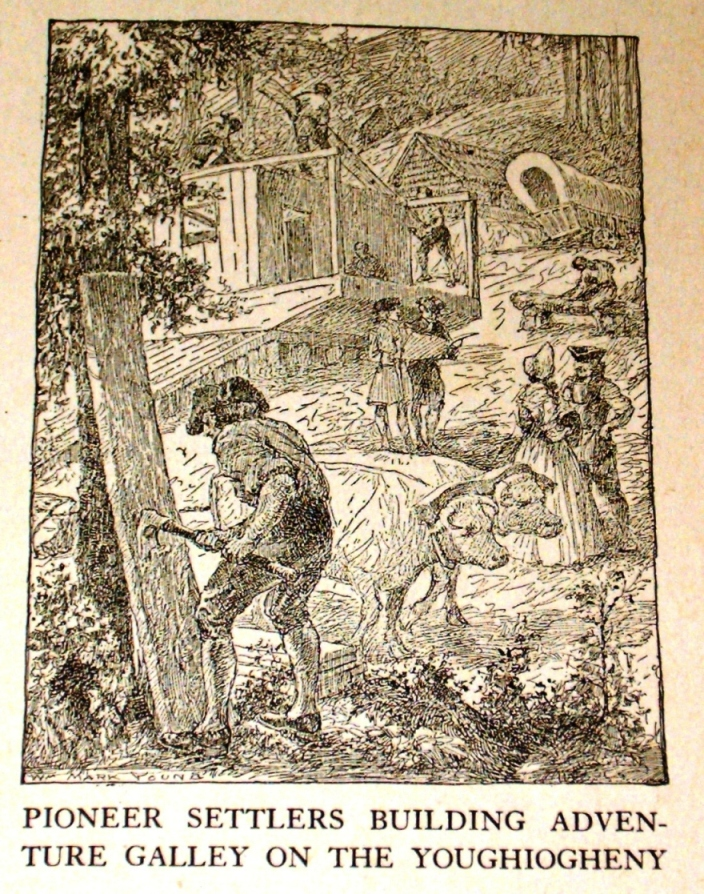
Pioneers building the flatboat, Adventure Galley, at Sumrill's Ferry (present-day West Newton, Pennsylvania) during March 1788

== Notable people ==
- Ray Luzier, rock music drummer, Korn and David Lee Roth
- James L. Swauger, archaeologist
- Danny Taylor, former professional baseball player
