= James L. Swauger =

American archaeologist (1913–2005)

James Swauger
- Born: 1 November 1935; West Newton, Pennsylvania, United States
- Died: 18 December 2005 (aged 92) Johnston, Rhode Island, United States
- Allegiance: United States
- Education: University of Pittsburgh (BA)
- Spouse: Helen
- Children: 2 daughters and 1 son

James L. Swauger (November 1, 1913 – December 18, 2005) was an American archaeologist known for his work on the petroglyphs of the Ohio River valley of the United States. Born in West Newton in Westmoreland County, Pennsylvania, he moved to the Pittsburgh suburb of Edgewood in his youth; there he lived for most of the rest of his life.

At the age of 22, Swauger began working for Pittsburgh's Carnegie Museum of Natural History; he started as an archaeology and ethnology assistant. Swauger was awarded a bachelor's degree in zoology in 1941 from the University of Pittsburgh. During World War II, he served in the U.S. Army with the rank of First Lieutenant; after his 1946 discharge, he resumed his position at the Carnegie Museum, and he returned to the University of Pittsburgh to earn an M. Litt in history. Swauger was promoted to the position of archaeology and ethnology curator in 1949; as his career progressed, he became an associate director of the museum in 1955, received the title of "Senior Scientist" in 1976, and was made a curator emeritus in 1981.

Swauger was largely responsible for the modern anthropology program at the Carnegie Museum, which had fallen into abeyance in the early 20th century. After conducting research in locations as varied as Nebraska and southern Yemen, he received significant grants in the 1950s to begin the excavation of Fort Pitt and Fort Duquesne at the present site of Point State Park in downtown Pittsburgh. In connection with these excavations, Swauger helped to found the Upper Ohio Valley Archaeology Survey.

During the 1950s, Swauger began to be professionally interested in the study of Native American rock art; he concentrated on the upper Ohio River valley region, although his studies also encompassed some of the petroglyphs of the northeastern United States. As a part of this specialty, he aided in founding multiple academic conferences on the subject of rock art, including a 1970 conference in Virginia that was the first of its kind anywhere in the eastern part of the United States. Among his writings was a book known as Rock Art of the Upper Ohio Valley, which has been regarded as a leading work in the archaeology of the region. This book was one of nearly 300 works on anthropology and museology that Swauger published; additionally, he produced extensive notes, amounting to at least nineteen volumes by 1979. Although he retired in 1981, he continued to work actively as late as 1996, both visiting petroglyph sites and publishing new writings. Besides his work in archaeology, he was known as a master organizer; soon after taking the assistant director position at the Carnegie Museum, he personally reorganized a massive collection of entomological information that had previously been in disarray, and this pattern he continued throughout the rest of his life.

In 2005, Swauger died of pneumonia at a nursing home in Johnston, Rhode Island, aged 92. He was survived by his son and two daughters, along with multiple grandchildren and great-grandchildren. In the aftermath of his death, he was recalled as an "ageless" figure who had created a benchmark for every other archaeologist working in western Pennsylvania.
