= New Hampshire Farm Museum =

- Plumer-Jones Farm
- U.S. National Register of Historic Places
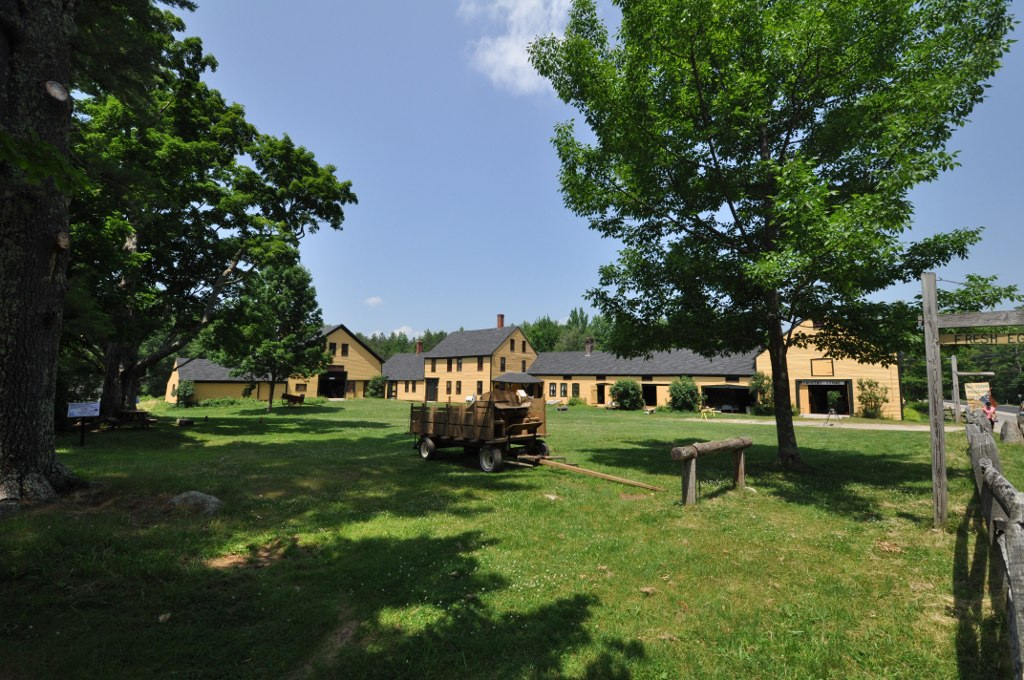

- Location within New Hampshire Location within the United States
- Location: 1305 White Mountain Highway, Milton, New Hampshire
- Coordinates: 43°27′38″N 70°59′30″W
- Area: 30 acres (12 ha)
- Built: 1782
- NRHP reference No.: 79000212
- Added to NRHP: March 23, 1979

The New Hampshire Farm Museum is a farm museum on White Mountain Highway (New Hampshire Route 125) in Milton, New Hampshire, United States. Three centuries of New Hampshire rural life are presented in the historic farmhouse. The museum includes a 104-foot-long (32 m) three-story great barn with collection of agricultural machinery, farm tools, sleighs and wagons. There are also live farm animals, a nature trail and a museum shop. The museum is located on the former Plumer-Jones Farm, a traditional series of connected buildings with farmhouse dating to the late 18th century and barns dating to the mid 19th century, which was listed on the National Register of Historic Places in 1979.

== Setting ==
The New Hampshire Farm Museum is set on over 60 acres (24 ha) of land between New Hampshire Route 125 to the east, and the Spaulding Turnpike to the west. This land is a subset of land settled in the 1780s by Joseph and Beard Plumer, two of the area's early settlers. The land they worked has been reduced by the construction of the turnpike. Most of the farm property consists of wood lots; about 10 acres (4.0 ha) is open fields, used by the museum as a working demonstration farm.

The focal point of the museum is the connected 19th-century farmstead, a series of structures beginning with a small barn near the road, and ending with the Great Barn, one of the largest barns in southeastern New Hampshire. The farmstead includes as one of its intermediate ells the 1782 house of Joseph Plumer, quite possibly one of the first wood-frame structures built in this part of Milton. The main block of the farmstead, located near its center, was built about 1810, and served as a local tavern.

The museum also owns the Plummer Homestead adjacent to the south; it was built by Beard Plumer.

== Features ==
The museum functions as a working demonstration farm. The Great Barn houses three floors of exhibits of farm implements and machinery. The main farmhouse and the Plummer farmhouse are open to guided tours; the sections of the Jones house are each decorated in the style of a different era. Also on the property are a blacksmith's shop, with demonstrations on weekends, and a cider mill barn, which is used as an education venue. Walking trails wind their way through the wood lots at the back of the property.

== Museum history ==
After its acquisition by the Plumers (later spelled "Plummer") in the 18th century, it was farmed by generations of Joneses and Plummers. The Jones heirs donated more than 300 acres (120 ha) to the University of New Hampshire, and the core of the farmstead to the Society for the Protection of New Hampshire Forests in 1973. It was acquired by the museum as its permanent home in 1979.

== See also ==
- Open-air museum
- National Register of Historic Places listings in Strafford County, New Hampshire
