= Herbert Plumer, 1st Viscount Plumer =

British Army general (1857–1932)

Field Marshal The Right Honourable The Viscount Plumer GCB GCMG GCVO GBE
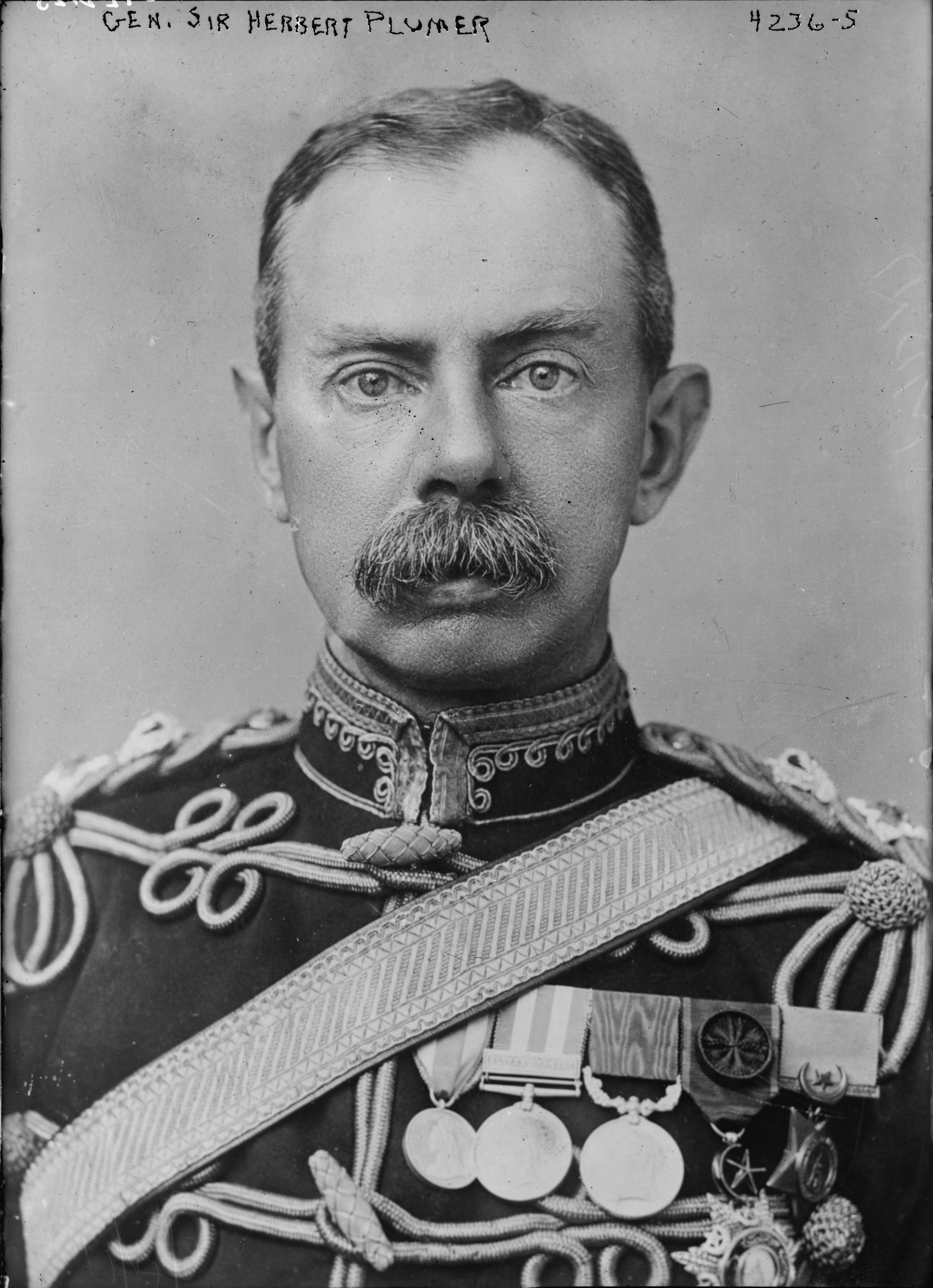
- Portrait by Alexander Bassano, 1899
- Born: 13 March 1857; Kensington, London, England, United Kingdom
- Died: 16 July 1932 (aged 75); Knightsbridge, London, England, United Kingdom
- Burial place: Westminster Abbey
- Military career
- Allegiance: United Kingdom
- Branch: British Army
- Service years: 1876–1919
- Rank: Field Marshal
- Units: 65th (2nd Yorkshire, North Riding) Regiment of Foot; York and Lancaster Regiment
- Commands: British Army of the Rhine; Second Army; Northern Command; 5th Division; 7th Division; 10th Division; 4th Brigade
- Conflicts: Mahdist War; Second Matabele War; Second Boer War; First World War
- Awards: Knight Grand Cross of the Order of the Bath; Knight Grand Cross of the Order of St Michael and St George; Knight Grand Cross of the Royal Victorian Order; Knight Grand Cross of the Order of the British Empire; Mentioned in Despatches
- Other work: High Commissioner of Palestine

Field Marshal Herbert Charles Onslow Plumer, 1st Viscount Plumer (13 March 1857 – 16 July 1932) was a senior British Army officer who fought in the First World War, being perhaps most notable for commanding the Second Army of the British Expeditionary Force on the Western Front from 1915 to 1918.

== Early life and education ==
Herbert Plumer was son of Hall Plumer of Malpas Lodge, Torquay, Devon (a grandson of Sir Thomas Plumer), and Louisa Alice, daughter of Henry Turnley, of Kensington. He was educated at Eton College and the Royal Military College, Sandhurst.

== Early military career ==
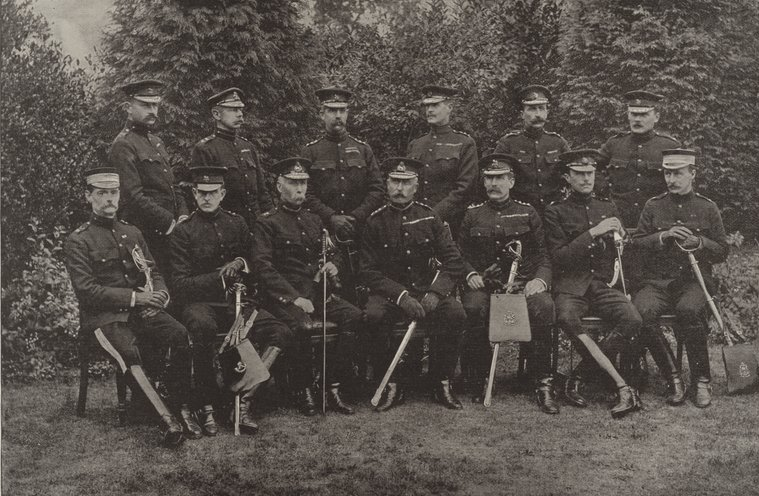
The retirement of the Duke of Connaught from the Aldershot Command, 1898. Stood in the back row, second from the left, is Lieutenant Colonel Plumer.

Plumer was commissioned as a lieutenant into the 65th Regiment of Foot on 11 September 1876. He joined his regiment in India and became adjutant of his battalion on 29 April 1879.

Promoted to captain on 29 May 1882, he accompanied his battalion to the Sudan in 1884 as part of the Nile Expedition. Plumer was present at the Battle of El Teb in February 1884 and the Battle of Tamai in March, and was mentioned in dispatches. He spent from 1886 to 1887 attending the Staff College, Camberley, gaining his psc, before being appointed deputy assistant adjutant general in Jersey on 7 May 1890.

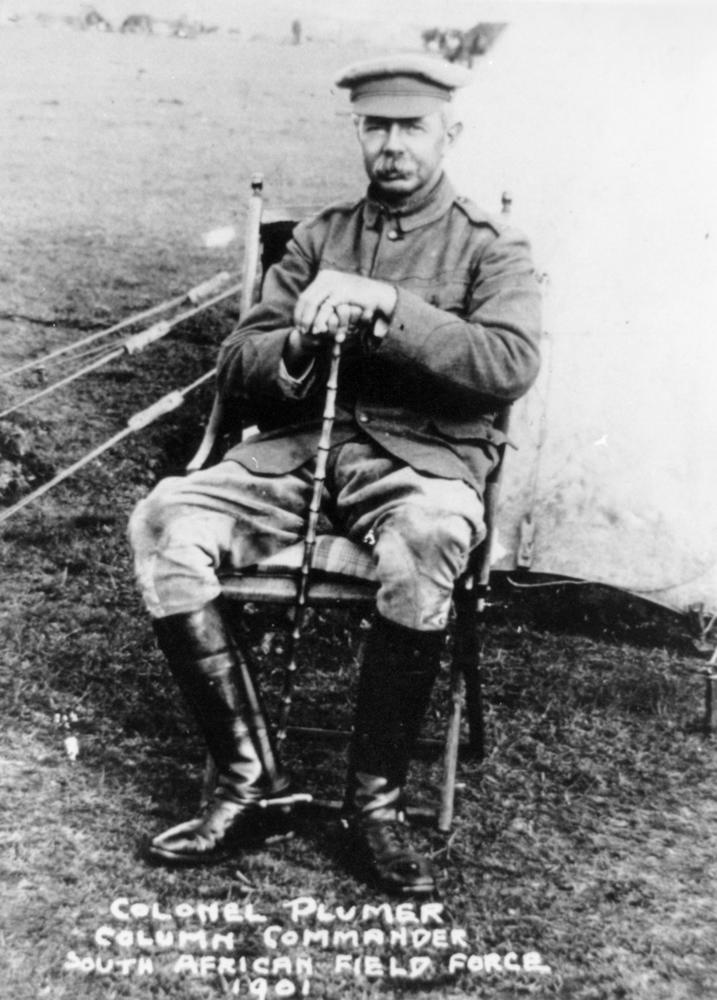
Colonel Plumer, South African Field Force, 1901.

He was promoted to major on 22 January 1893 and posted to the 2nd Battalion the York and Lancaster Regiment before being appointed assistant military secretary to the General Officer Commanding Cape Colony in December 1895. He went to Southern Rhodesia in 1896 to disarm the local police force following the Jameson Raid and then later that year returned there to command the Matabele Relief Force during the Second Matabele War. He became deputy assistant adjutant-general at Aldershot with promotion to brevet lieutenant colonel on 8 May 1897.

In 1899 Plumer returned to Southern Rhodesia where he raised a force of mounted infantry and, having been promoted to the substantive rank of lieutenant colonel on 17 October 1900, he led them at the Relief of Mafeking during the Second Boer War. He was promoted to colonel on 29 November 1900 and was then given command of a mixed force which captured General Christiaan de Wet's wagon train at Hamelfontein in February 1901.

Plumer arrived back in the United Kingdom in April 1902, and two months later was received in audience by King Edward VII on his return. In a despatch dated 23 June 1902, Major General Lord Kitchener, Commander-in-Chief in South Africa during the latter part of the war, wrote how Plumer had "invariable displayed military qualifications of a very high order. Few officers have rendered better service." He was promoted to major general for distinguished service in the field on 22 August 1902, and was appointed Commander of the 4th Brigade within 1st Army Corps on 1 October 1902. The following year he became General Officer Commanding 10th Division within IV Army Corps and General Officer Commanding Eastern District in December 1903. He became Quartermaster-General to the Forces in February 1904, General Officer Commanding 7th Division in April 1906 and General Officer Commanding 5th Division within Irish Command in May 1907. Promoted to lieutenant general on 4 November 1908, he went on to be General Officer Commanding-in-Chief for Northern Command in November 1911.

In addition to his military duties, he served as the Commissioner for London Boy Scouts from 1910 to 1912.

== First World War ==
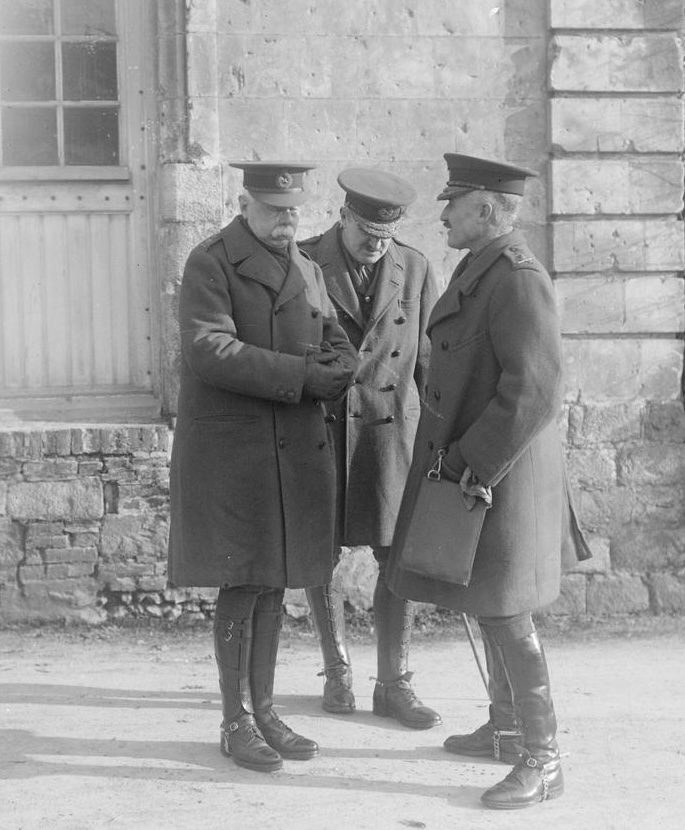
General Plumer (left), together with General Sir Edmund Allenby (centre) and General Sir Henry Horne in conference at Camblain-Chatelain, France, c. 1916.

Following the unexpected death of Lieutenant General Sir James Grierson on his arrival in France in 1914, Plumer was considered for command of one of the two corps which made up the British Expeditionary Force (BEF) alongside the GOC I Corps, commanded by Lieutenant General Sir Douglas Haig: this position eventually went to General Sir Horace Smith-Dorrien instead. Plumer was sent to France in February 1915 and given command of V Corps which he led at the Second Battle of Ypres in April 1915.

He succeeded Smith-Dorrien in command of the Second Army of the BEF in May and, having been promoted to full general on 11 June 1915, and was in command of the Army during the Actions of St Eloi Craters. He won an overwhelming victory over the Imperial German Army at the Battle of Messines in June 1917.

The battle started with the simultaneous explosion of a series of mines placed by the Royal Engineers' tunnelling companies beneath German lines. The detonation created 19 large craters and was described as the loudest explosion in human history. After the mines were fired, Plumer's men left their trenches and advanced 3,000 yards. He won further victories at the Battle of the Menin Road Ridge and the Battle of Polygon Wood in September 1917 and the Battle of Broodseinde in October 1917 advancing another 5,000 yards in the process.

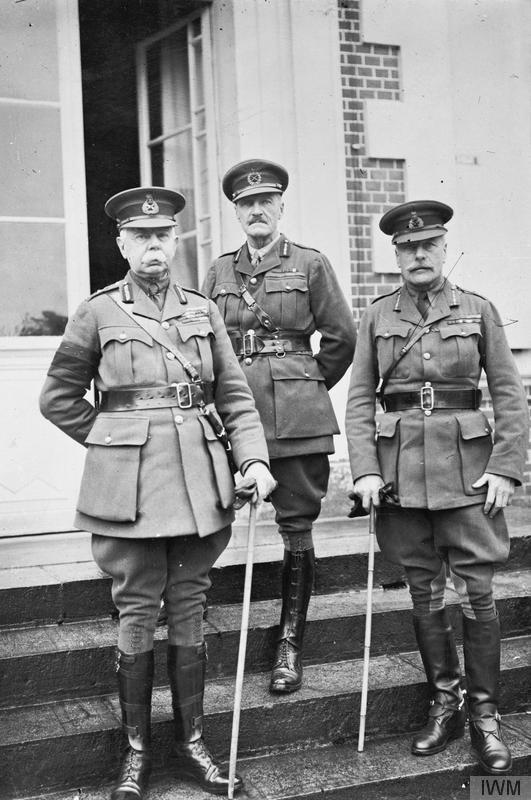
Field Marshal Sir Douglas Haig (right), C-in-C BEF, Lieutenant General Sir Herbert Lawrence (centre), Haig's chief of the general staff, and General Plumer, standing on the steps of Haig's general headquarters, c. 1918.

In November Plumer, who in August had been made colonel of the York and Lancaster Regiment, gave up control of the Second Army when he was given command of the Italian Expeditionary Force, which ultimately grew into a force of five British divisions withdrawn from the West, sent to the Italian Front after the disaster at Caporetto.

Early in 1918, Plumer was sought by Prime Minister David Lloyd George for the position of Chief of the Imperial General Staff as a replacement for General Sir William Robertson: he declined the position.

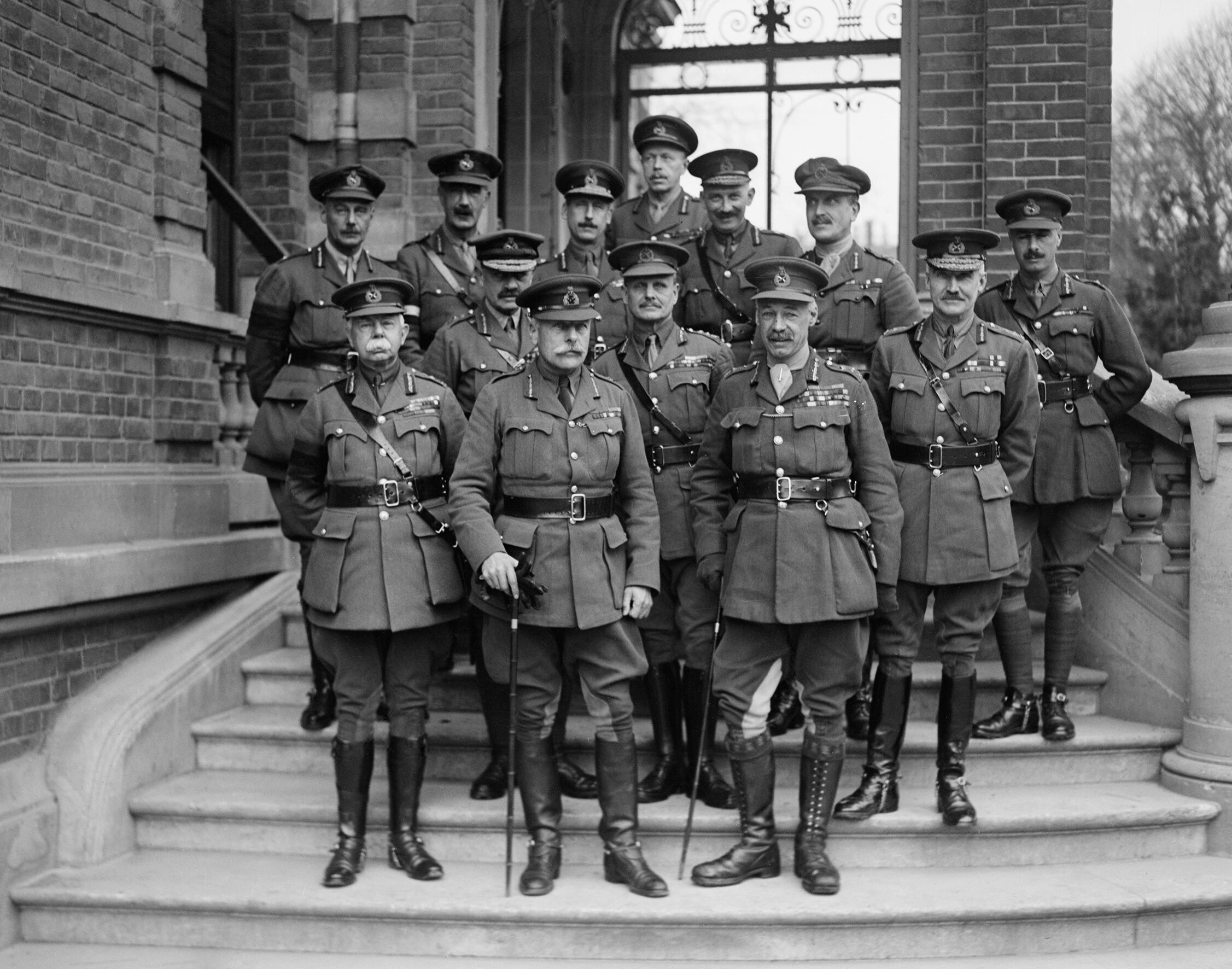
Field Marshal Haig (centre front) with his senior commanders and staff officers at Cambrai, France, 11 November 1918. Stood in the front row, to Haig's right, is General Sir Herbert Plumer.

Plumer instead returned to the Western Front and resumed command of the Second Army, which soon found itself involved in the German spring offensives which began in March 1918. Plumer's Second Army "was driven back from Messines, Wytschaete and Passchendaele, but, in a determined resistance, held on to Ypres".

In September, after the Allies counterattacked the Germans at the Second Battle of the Marne, and during the Hundred Days Offensive which followed, the Supreme Allied Commander on the Western Front, Ferdinand Foch, "placed Plumer and the Second Army under command of King Albert I of the Belgians", which formed part of the Flanders Group of Armies and which "made extensive gains" before the Armistice of 11 November 1918 finally brought the war to an end.

== Later career ==
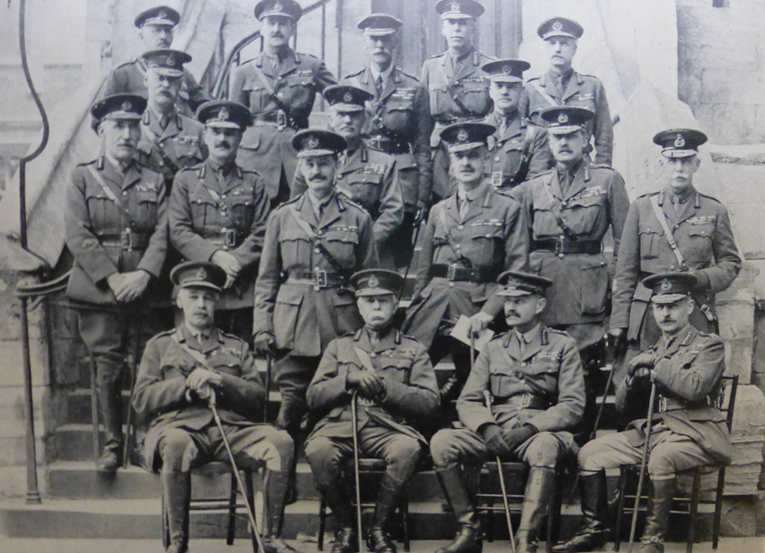
Eighteen Old Etonian generals revisit Eton, May 1919. General Plumer is sat in the front row, second from the left.

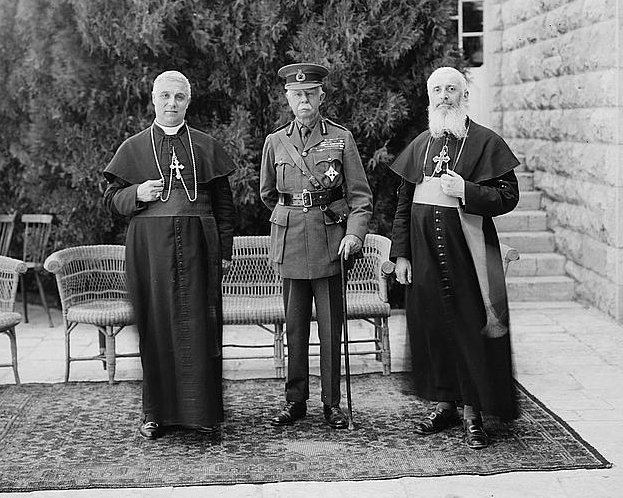
Alessio Ascalesi, the Archbishop of Naples, with Herbert Plumer, 1st Viscount Plumer, and Luigi Barlassina, the Latin Patriarch of Jerusalem, on the right, 11 August 1926

Plumer was appointed General Officer Commanding-in-Chief the British Army of the Rhine in December 1918 and governor of Malta in May 1919, in which role he succeeded Field Marshal Lord Methuen. He was promoted to field marshal on 31 July 1919, and was created Baron Plumer of Messines and of Bilton on 18 October 1919.

In August 1925 he was appointed High Commissioner of the British Mandate for Palestine. He resisted Arab pressure to reverse commitments made by the British Government in the Balfour Declaration, and dealt firmly with both the Zionists and the Arab Nationalists. On one occasion, an Arab delegation protested a proposal by Jewish battalions to install their regimental colours in the chief synagogues, saying they "wouldn't be responsible for the consequences". Plumer replied, 'That's all right, you're not asked to be responsible for the consequences. I'll be responsible." In Mandatory Palestine Plumer gained a reputation as being "genuinely even handed" and was one of the few British administrators who was consistently popular with both the Jewish community and the Arab community in that territory. Privately, he was sympathetic to the cause of establishing a homeland for the Jewish people but he tried his best to "be fair" to Arab concerns as well while he was High Commissioner.

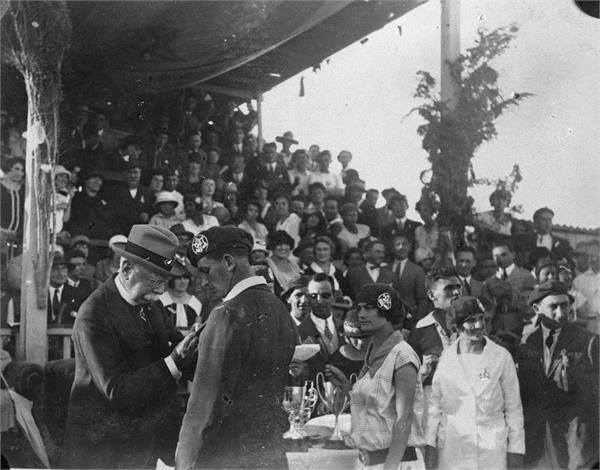
High Commissioner Plumer awarding prizes at a Maccabi event, Tel Aviv 1928

On 24 July 1927 he conducted the inauguration ceremony for the Menin Gate memorial at Ypres in Belgium.

Plumer, placed on half-pay in November 1928, was created Viscount Plumer for his "long and distinguished public services" on 3 June 1929.

== Death ==
Plumer died at his home in Knightsbridge in London on 16 July 1932 at the age of 75. His body was interred in Westminster Abbey.

== Family ==
In July 1884 Plumer married Annie Constance Goss (1858–1941), daughter of George and Eleanor Goss; they had three daughters and one son. Their youngest daughter, Marjorie, married Maj. W.H. Brooke who had studied at University College, Oxford and was a chief mourner at the Leeds funeral of Robert Middleton in October 1912.

== Honours ==
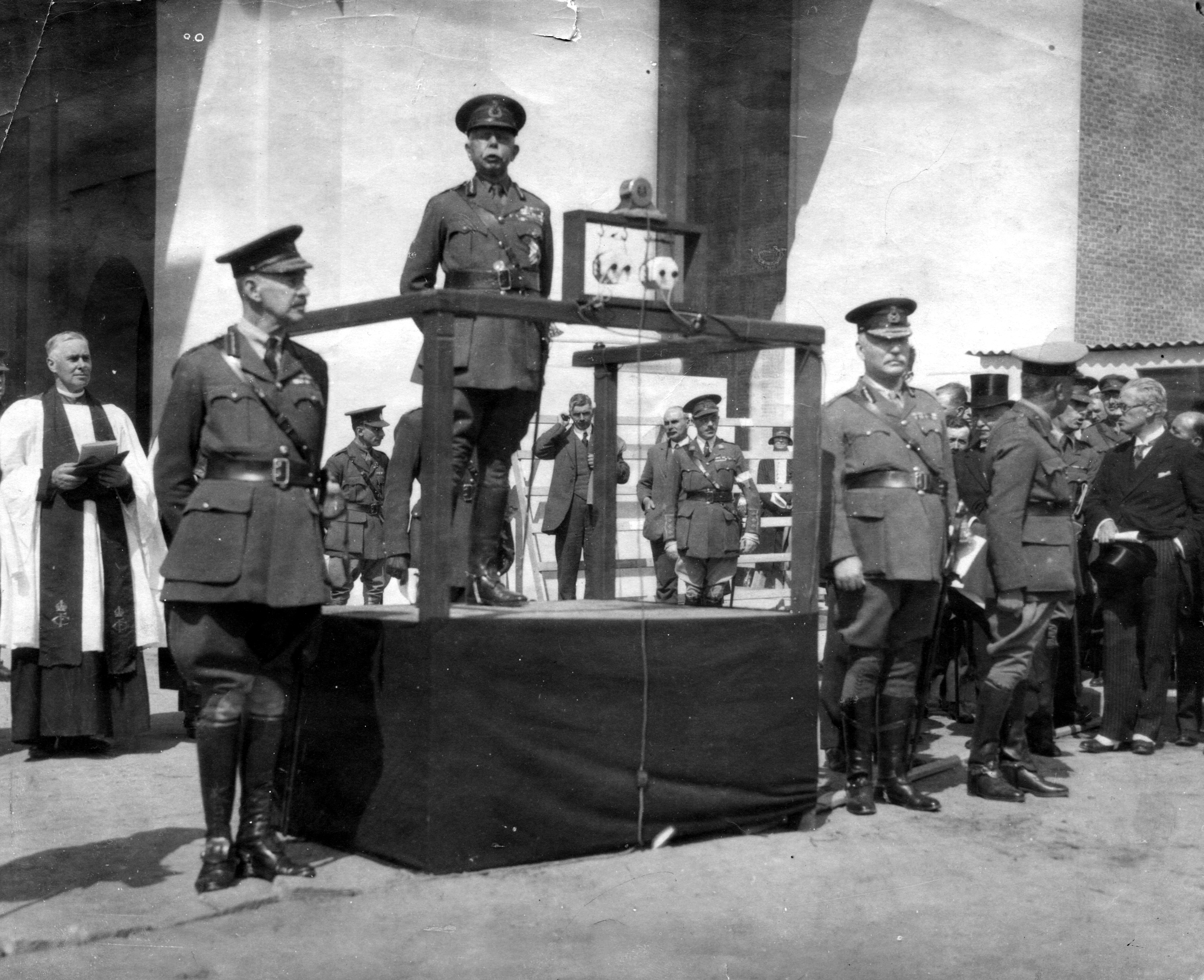
Field Marshal Lord Plumer at the unveiling of the Menin Gate memorial, Belgium, 24 July 1927

British

- Knight Grand Cross of the Order of the Bath – 1 January 1918 (KCB – 29 June 1906; CB – 19 April 1901)
- Knight Grand Cross of the Order of St Michael and St George – 1 January 1916
- Knight Grand Cross of the Royal Victorian Order – 14 July 1917
- Knight Grand Cross of the Order of the British Empire – 1924 Birthday Honours
- Knight of Grace of the Venerable Order of St John – 23 June 1925

Foreign

- Legion of Honour (France) – 14 December 1917
- Croix de Guerre (Belgium) – 11 March 1918
- Croix de Guerre with palm (France) – 11 March 1919
- Army Distinguished Service Medal (United States) – 12 July 1919
- Grand Cordon, Order of the Rising Sun (Japan) – 21 January 1921

Coat of arms of Herbert Plumer, 1st Viscount Plumer

Crest
A demi-lion Proper holding in the dexter paw a plume of four ostrich feathers Or.
Escutcheon
Gules on a chevron between in chief two lions' heads erased Argent and in base a sword of the second pommel and hilt Or and enfiled with a wreath of laurel Proper three ravens Sable.
Supporters
Dexter a Private in the York and Lancaster Regiment sinister a Trooper of the Rhodesian Field Force each holding in the exterior hand a rifle Proper.
Motto
Consulio Et Audacter (Deliberately And Boldly)

== See also ==
- Menin Gate

== General and cited sources ==
- "Liddell Hart Centre for Military Archives". Viscount Plumer. King's College London. 2008.
- "War Peers' Titles". The Times (42237): 12. 22 October 1919.
- "King's Birth Honours". The Times (45219): 10. 3 June 1929.
- "Lord Plumer (tribute)". The Times (46188): 13. 18 July 1932.
- "Field-Marshal Lord Plumer: A Great Leader of Men (obituary)". The Times (46188): 17. 18 July 1932.
- Heathcote, Tony (1999). The British Field Marshals 1736–1997. Barnsley (UK): Pen & Sword. ISBN 0-85052-696-5.
- Wolff, L. (2001) [1958]. In Flanders Fields: Passchendaele 1917. London: Penguin. ISBN 0-14139-079-4.

Military offices
Preceded by Sir William Gatacre	GOC Eastern District; 1903–1904	Succeeded by Arthur Singleton Wynne
Preceded by Sir Ian Hamilton	Quartermaster-General to the Forces; 1904–1905	Succeeded by Sir William Nicholson
Preceded by Gerald Morton	GOC 7th Division; 1906–1907	Post disbanded
Preceded by Henry Grant	GOC 5th Division; 1907–1909	Succeeded by William Campbell
Preceded by Sir Laurence Oliphant	GOC-in-C Northern Command; 1911–1914	Succeeded by Sir Henry Lawson
New command	GOC V Corps; February 1915 – May 1915	Succeeded by Edmund Allenby
Preceded by Sir Horace Smith-Dorrien	GOC Second Army; 1915–1917	Succeeded by Sir Henry Rawlinson
New command	C-in-C British Army of the Rhine; 1918–1919	Succeeded by Sir William Robertson
Government offices
Preceded by The Lord Methuen	Governor of Malta; 1919–1924	Succeeded by Sir Walter Congreve
Preceded by Sir Herbert Samuel	High Commissioner of Palestine; 1925–1928	Succeeded by Sir Harry Luke
Peerage of the United Kingdom
New creation	Viscount Plumer; 1929–1932	Succeeded by Thomas Plumer
New creation	Baron Plumer; 1919–1932	Succeeded by Thomas Plumer
