= Dick Building =

- U.S. National Register of Historic Places
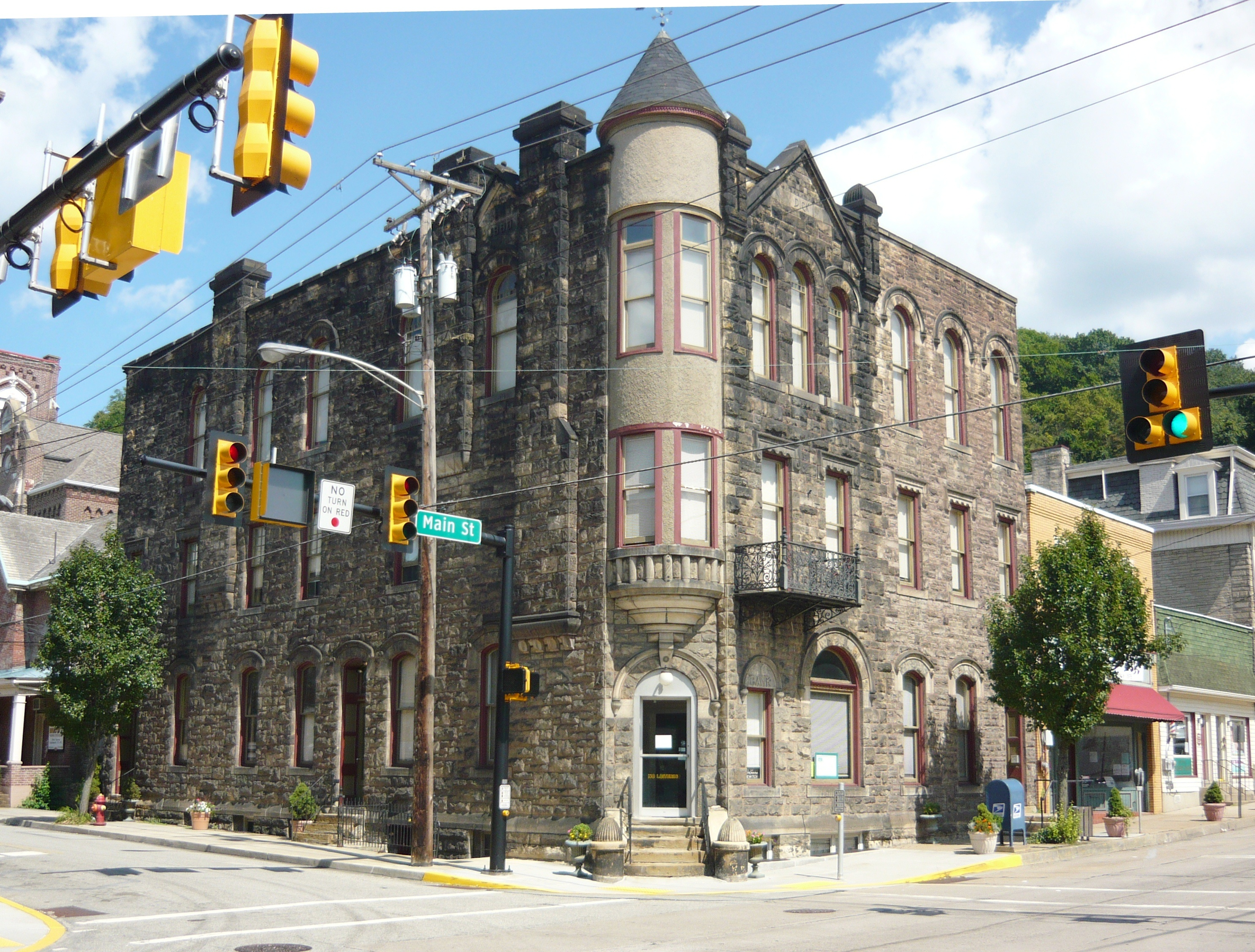
- Dick Building, August 2011

- Location within Pennsylvania Location within the United States
- Location: 201-203 E. Main St., West Newton, Pennsylvania
- Coordinates: 40°12′36″N 79°46′1″W
- Area: less than one acre
- Built: 1890
- Architectural style: Romanesque
- NRHP reference No.: 07000890
- Added to NRHP: August 30, 2007

Dick Building, also known as the Cornerstone Building, is a historic commercial and apartment building located in West Newton, Westmoreland County, Pennsylvania. The original section was built in 1890, with an addition made between 1910 and 1925. It is a three-story, L-shaped brick building executed in the Romanesque Revival style. It features a corner semi-circular turret with a conical roof. The building once housed a bank on its first floor.

It was added to the National Register of Historic Places in 2007.
