= Plumer House =

Historic house in Pennsylvania, United States

- U.S. National Register of Historic Places
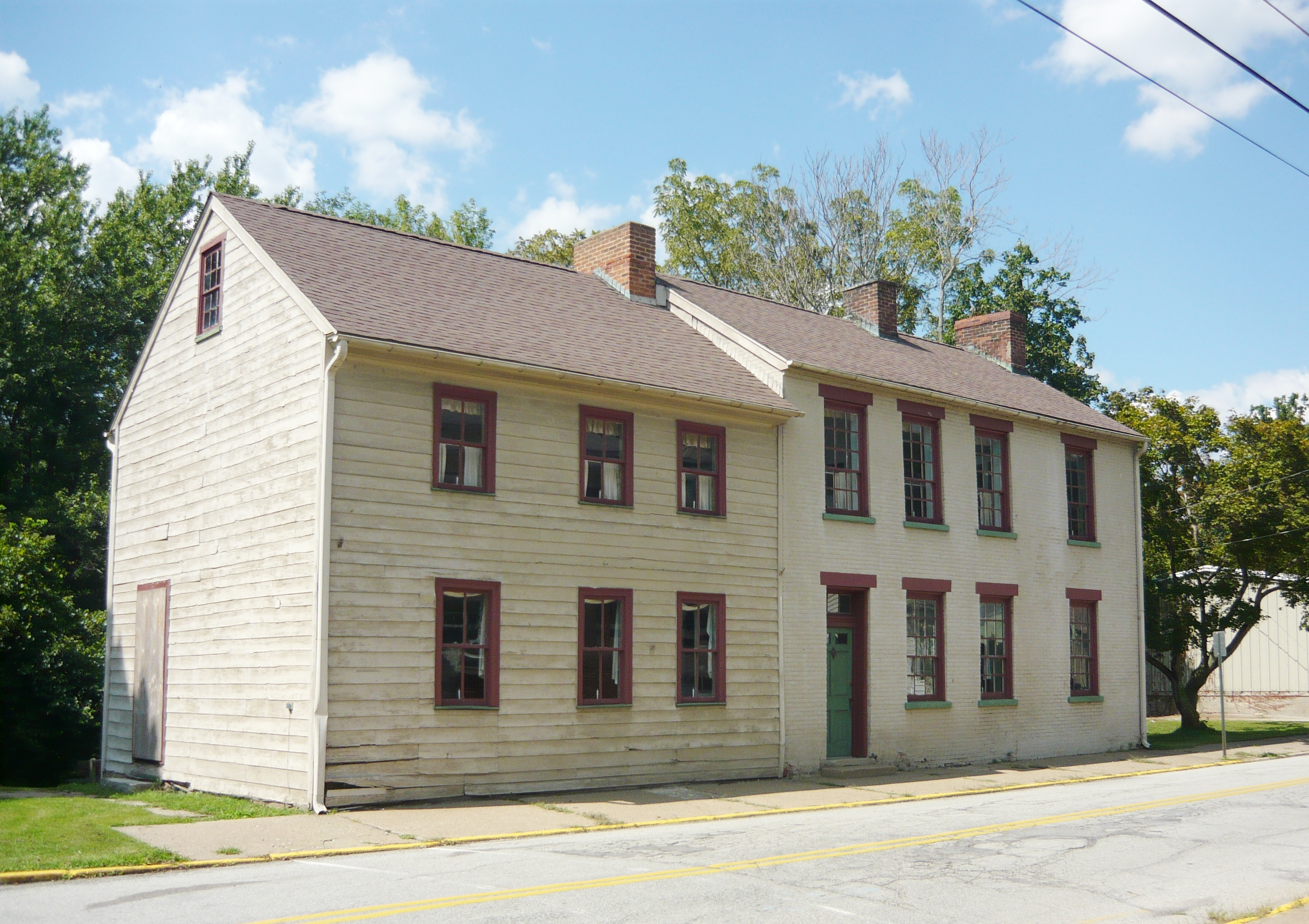
- Plumer House, August 2011

- Location within Pennsylvania Location within the United States
- Location: Vine and S. Water St., West Newton, Pennsylvania
- Coordinates: 40°12′33″N 79°46′10″W
- Area: 0.4 acres (0.16 ha)
- Built: 1814, 1846
- Built by: Plumer, John C.
- NRHP reference No.: 79002368
- Added to NRHP: December 6, 1979

The Plumer House is an historic home that is located in West Newton, Pennsylvania, United States.

It was added to the National Register of Historic Places in 1979.

== History and architectural features ==
The original section of this historic building was erected in 1814, with an addition made in 1846. The original section is a 2 1/2-story, wood-frame structure with a gable roof. The addition is a 2 1/2-story, brick structure with a gable roof and two chimneys. It features a rear porch overlooking the adjacent Youghiogheny River.
