= Plummer House (Beebe, Arkansas) =

Historic house in Arkansas, United States

- U.S. National Register of Historic Places
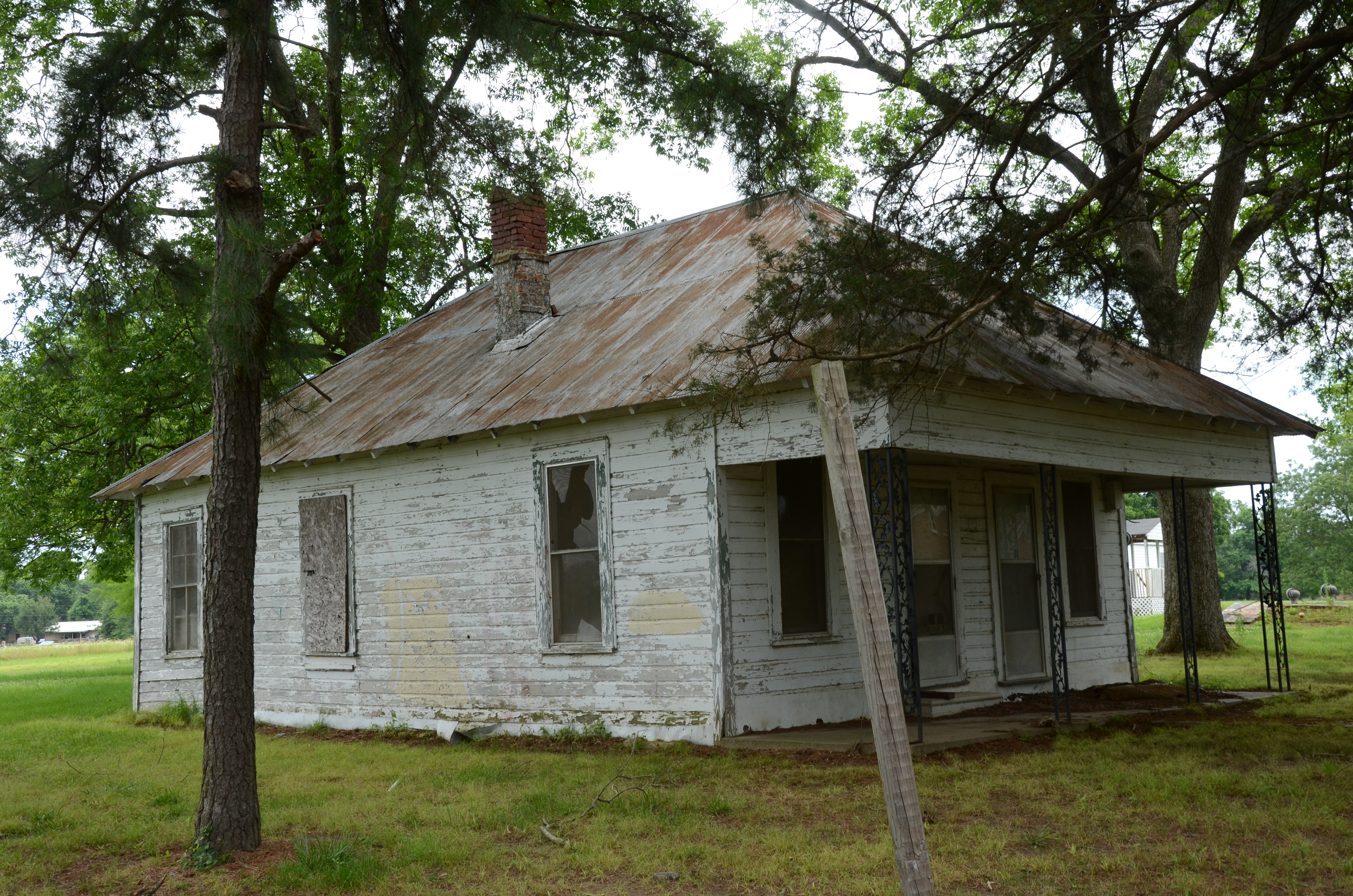

- Location within Arkansas Location within the United States
- Location: 314 Alabama St., Beebe, Arkansas
- Coordinates: 35°3′39″N 91°52′37″W
- Area: less than one acre
- Built: 1915
- Architectural style: Vernacular double-pile box c
- MPS: White County MPS
- NRHP reference No.: 91001247
- Added to NRHP: July 22, 1992

The Plummer House is a historic house at 314 Alabama Street in Beebe, Arkansas. It is a single story wood-frame structure, with a gable roof, novelty siding, and a foundation of stone piers. It is a vernacular double-pile box framed building, constructed about 1915. It is a well-preserved example of this type of period construction in White County.

The house was listed on the National Register of Historic Places in 1992.

== See also ==
- National Register of Historic Places listings in White County, Arkansas
