= Plummer Homestead =

Historic house in New Hampshire, United States

- U.S. National Register of Historic Places
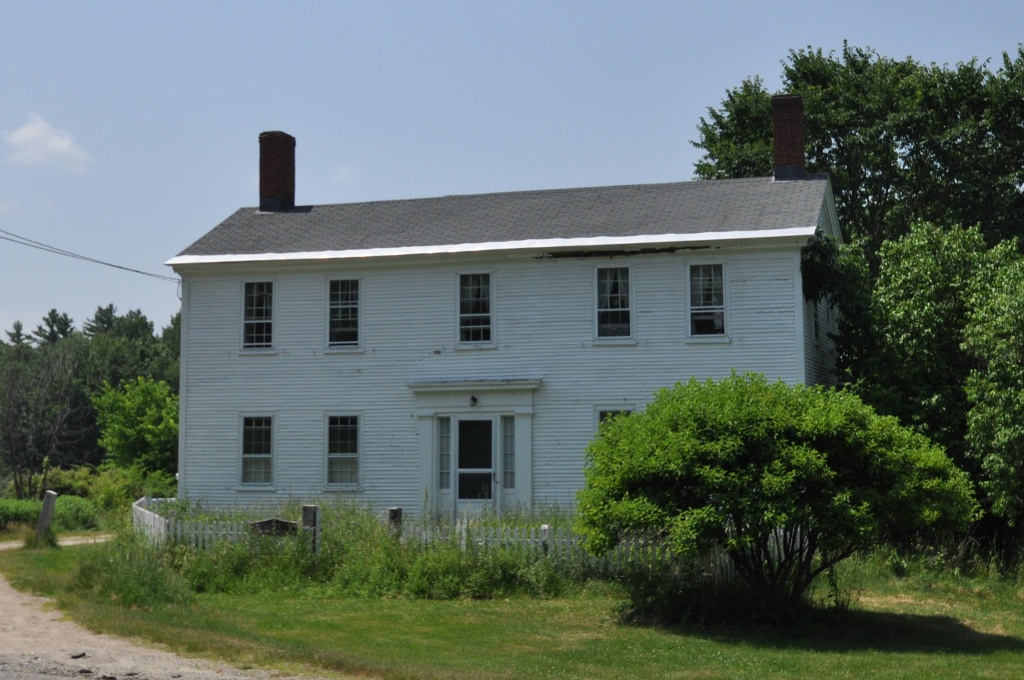

- Location within New Hampshire Location within the United States
- Location: 1273 White Mountain Hwy., Milton, New Hampshire
- Coordinates: 43°27′35″N 70°59′33″W
- Area: 20 acres (8.1 ha)
- Built: 1780
- Architectural style: Colonial, Federal
- NRHP reference No.: 02000638
- Added to NRHP: June 14, 2002

The Plummer Homestead is a historic house museum at 1273 White Mountain Highway in Milton, New Hampshire. Built in the 1810s and repeatedly extended, it dates to the early settlement period of Milton, and is, along with the adjacent Plumer-Jones Farm, one of the oldest farm properties in the state. Both are now part of the New Hampshire Farm Museum. The house was listed on the National Register of Historic Places in 2002.

== Description and history ==
The Plummer Homestead is located on the west side of White Mountain Highway (New Hampshire Route 125) in central Milton. It is a typical 19th-century New England connected farmstead, with a main house, "little house", "back house", and barn, extending westward from the road. The main block of the house was originally a 1 1/2-story Cape-style house, which was raised to a full two stories in 1848. An extended seven-bay ell connects this main block to a c. 1870 barn. This cluster of buildings stands on about 20 acres (8.1 ha) of land, the remnant of a once larger property reduced in part by the construction of the nearby Spaulding Turnpike. Its immediate surroundings are typical of a 19th-century farm layout, with a grassy and slightly more formal front yard, a working main yard on the south side of the building, where entrances to each of the farmstead's sections are located, and the farm's vegetable garden, located just north of the farmstead.

The main house was built in the 1780s by Beard Plumer, brother of Joseph Plumer who built the adjacent Plumer-Jones Farm, and it was occupied by a succession of Plumer (later Plummer) descendants until the 1990s. It was acquired by the New Hampshire Farm Museum in 1993, which offers tours of the property and uses it in its historical programs.

== See also ==
- National Register of Historic Places listings in Strafford County, New Hampshire
