= Plumb House =

Plumb House may refer to the following historic American houses:

- Plumb House (Clearwater, Florida)
- Plumb House (Middletown, Connecticut)
- Plumb House (Waynesboro, Virginia)

== See also ==
- Plumb Grove, a historic house and farm near Clear Spring, Maryland, on the National Register of Historic Places
