= Viscount Plumer =

Extinct viscountcy in the Peerage of the United Kingdom

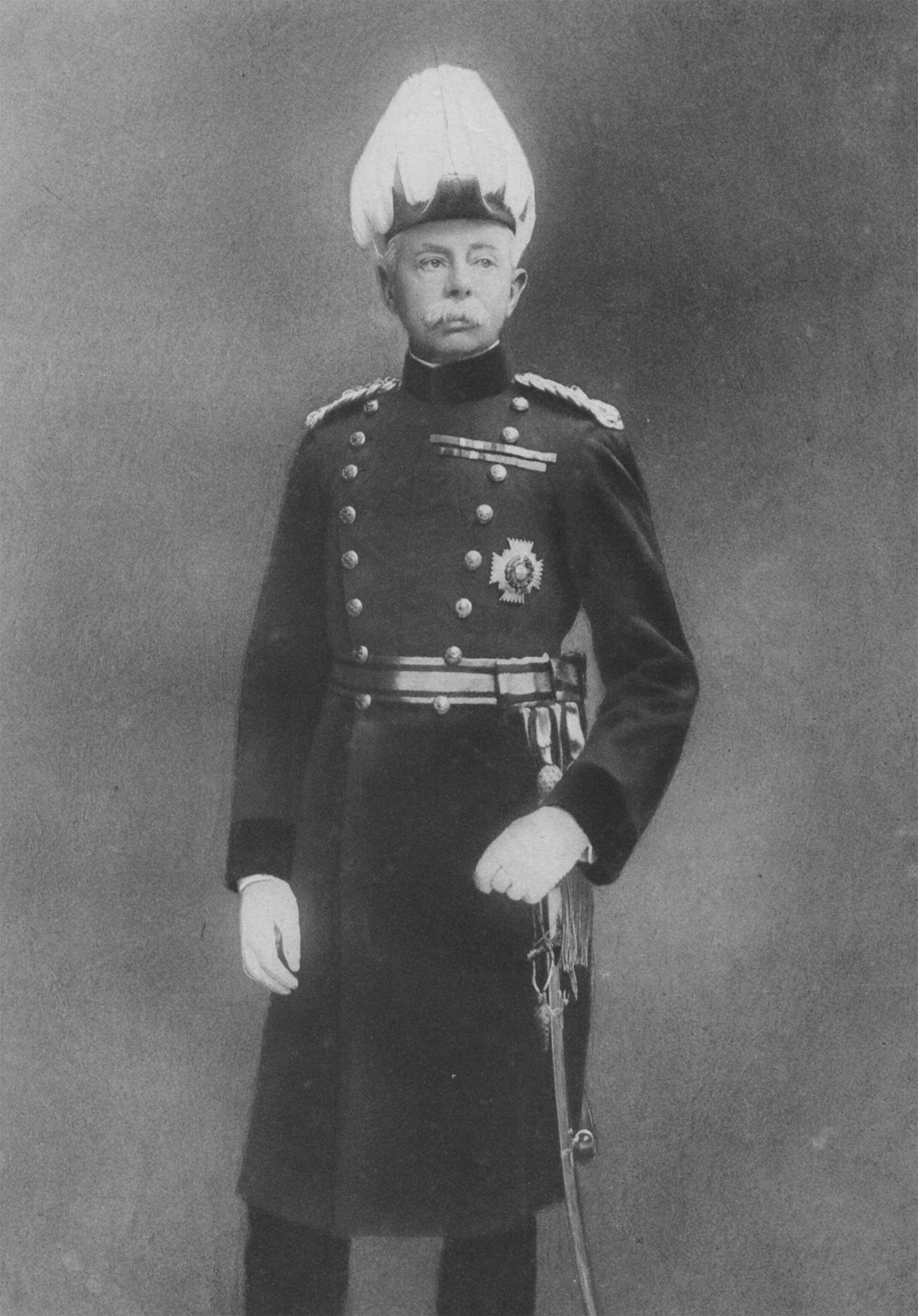
Herbert Plumer, 1st Viscount Plumer.

Viscount Plumer, of Messines and of Bilton in the County of York, was a title in the Peerage of the United Kingdom. It was created on 3 June 1929 for the soldier and colonial official Field Marshal Herbert Plumer, 1st Baron Plumer. He had already been created Baron Plumer, of Messines and of Bilton in the County of York, on 18 October 1919, also in the Peerage of the United Kingdom. Both titles became extinct after the death of his son and successor, the second Viscount, in 1944.

== Viscounts Plumer (1929) ==
- Herbert Onslow Plumer, 1st Viscount Plumer (1857–1932)
- Thomas Hall Rokeby Plumer, 2nd Viscount Plumer (1890–1944)

== Arms ==
Coat of arms of Viscount Plumer

Crest
A demi-lion Proper holding in the dexter paw a plume of four ostrich feathers Or.
Escutcheon
Gules on a chevron between in chief two lions' heads erased Argent and in base a sword of the second pommel and hilt Or and enfiled with a wreath of laurel Proper three ravens Sable.
Supporters
Dexter a Private in the York and Lancaster Regiment sinister a Trooper of the Rhodesian Field Force each holding in the exterior hand a rifle Proper.
Motto
Consulio Et Audacter (Deliberately And Boldly)
