= Plum Island =

Plum Island may refer to:

== Places ==
- Plum Island (Massachusetts), an island in Essex County, Massachusetts
  - Plum Island Airport, in Newburyport, Massachusetts
- Plum Island (New York), an island near Long Island, New York
  - Plum Island Animal Disease Center, a United States federal research facility dedicated to the study of animal diseases that is located on Plum Island, New York
  - Plum Island Light also known as Plum Gut Light, a lighthouse located on Plum Island, New York
- Plum Island (Wisconsin), an island in Washington Township, Door County, Wisconsin
  - Plum Island Range Lights, a pair of range lights located on Plum Island in Door County, Wisconsin
- Plum Island Bald Eagle Refuge, a 52-acre island in the Illinois River
- Plum Island Site, Native American archaeological site in Illinois

== Art, entertainment, and media ==
- Plum Island (novel), a 1997 novel by Long Island author Nelson DeMille
- Plum Island (Survival of the Dead), fictional island
- "Plum Island", a song by the band Waterparks from the album Double Dare
- "Plum Island", a song by music group The Orb from the album Cydonia

== See also ==
- Plummers Island, in Montgomery County, Maryland
