= Plum (disambiguation) =

A plum is both a type of tree and the fruit stemming from that tree.

Plum may also refer to:

== Places ==
- Plum, Pennsylvania
- Plum, Texas
- Plum Township, Venango County, Pennsylvania
- Plum, New Caledonia

== People ==
=== Given name ===
- Pelham Warner (nicknamed "Plum"; 1873–1963), British Test cricketer
- P. G. Wodehouse (nicknamed "Plum"; 1881–1975), British author and humorist
- Plum Johnson (born ?), Canadian writer and publisher
- Plum Lewis (1884–1976), South African cricketer
- Plum Mariko (born Mariko Umeda; 1967–1997), Japanese professional wrestler
- Plum Sykes (born 1969), British fashion writer and novelist

=== Surname ===
- Agnes Plum (1869–1951), German politician
- Alois Plum (born 1935), German artist noted for working in mural and stained-glass mediums
- Amy Plum (born 1967), American–French young-adult fiction writer
- Carol Plum-Ucci (born 1957), American young-adult novelist and essayist
- Ego Plum (born Ernesto Guerrero; 1975), American composer, musician, visual artist, and record producer
- Frederick Plum (1887–1932), American sports shooter and Olympic competitor
- Fred Plum (1924–2010), American neurologist
- Ivan Plum (born 1992), Croatian footballer
- Kelsey Plum (born 1994), American basketball player
- Kenneth R. Plum (born 1941), American politician
- Martin Plum (born 1982), German politician
- Milt Plum (born 1935), American football quarterback
- Nigel Plum (born 1983), Australian Rugby League footballer
- Polly Plum (pseudonym of Mary Ann Colclough; 1836–1885), New Zealand feminist and social reformer
- Seth Plum (1899–1969), English international footballer
- Thelma Plum (born 1994), Indigenous Australian singer-songwriter

=== Fictional characters ===
- Plum Pudding, a character in the Strawberry Shortcake franchise
- Nanny Plum, a character in the series Ben & Holly's Little Kingdom
- Professor Plum, a character in the game Cluedo (aka Clue)
- Stephanie Plum, protagonist of several novels by Janet Evanovich
- Victoria Plum, a children's literature character created by Angela Rippon

== Music ==
- Plum (Wand album), a 2017 album by US band Wand
- Plum (Widowspeak album), a 2020 album by US band Widowspeak
- "Plum", a song by Troye Sivan from the album Bloom

== Company ==
- Plum (company)

== Other uses ==
- Plum (color)
- PLUM keyboard
- Plum-coloured starling, a bird in sub-Saharan Africa.
- Raisins, to which the word referred in pre-Victorian times.
- Plum (TV series) an Australian television drama for ABC.
- Davidsonia, a genus of plants endemic to Australia known as Davidson's Plum

== See also ==
- Plumb (disambiguation)
- Plum Creek (disambiguation)
- Plum Island (disambiguation)
- Plumology (plumage science)
